= List of reported UFO sightings =

Most commonly reported shapes in UFO sightings gathered in the National UFO Reporting Center (NUFORC) Online Database

This is a list of notable reported sightings of unidentified flying objects (UFOs), some of which include related claims of close encounters of the second or third kind or alien abduction. UFOs are generally considered to include any perceived aerial phenomenon that cannot be immediately identified or explained. Upon investigation, most UFOs are identified as known objects or atmospheric phenomena, while a small number remain unexplained. UFOs have been referred to using a range of terms including the more specific "flying saucer" and the more general term "unidentified anomalous phenomena" (UAP). "UAP" is sometimes used to avoid cultural associations with UFO conspiracy theories.

Although often viewed as abnormal, UFO sightings are reported frequently. During the United States' initial 1947 wave, over 800 sightings were reported in the news. The British Ministry of Defence receives hundreds of reports each year. In Brazil, pilots alone report dozens of annual sightings. A small portion of reported sightings have lasting cultural significance, interpreted through the cultural and technological expectations of the time.

== Antiquity ==
Date	Name	Location	Description
c. 1450 BCE	Thutmose III Jebel Barkal Stele	Ancient Egypt; Jebel Barkal, Lower Egypt	After a military campaign in Nubia, Thutmose III had a stele erected at the Temple of Amun, beneath the Jebel Barkal outcropping. The stele describes how "a star came down" to set fire to Thutmose's adversaries. This has been cited by ufologists via the purported Tulli Papyrus, likely a fraud. This alleged translation—published in issue 41 of the Fortean Society's magazine Doubt—used such Fortean tropes as "circles of fire" and fish that "fell down from the sky".
218 BCE	Ships in the sky	Roman Republic; Italia	Some 200 years after the event, Livy recorded prodigies in the winter sky during the build-up to the Second Punic War, including navium speciem de caelo adfulsisse ("phantom ships had been seen gleaming in the sky").
76 BCE	Spark from a falling star	Roman Republic; Asia	According to Pliny the Elder, a spark fell from a star and grew as it descended until it appeared to be the size of the Moon. It then ascended and transformed into a torch. Astronomer Richard Stothers interpreted the report as a description of a bolide.
73 BCE	Flame-like wine-jars from the sky	Roman Republic; Phrygia, Asia	According to Plutarch, a Roman army commanded by Lucullus was about to begin a battle with Mithridates VI of Pontus when "the sky burst asunder, and a huge, flame-like body was seen to fall between the two armies". Plutarch reports the shape of the object as like a wine-jar (pithos).
65 BCE	Fiery shield	Roman Republic; Italia	In the Naturalis historia (II, 100), Pliny the Elder recorded that clipeus ardens ab occasu ad orientem scintillans pervolavit solis occasu ("a fiery, sparkling shield flew across from west to east at sunset").
CE 64	Flying shield	Roman Republic; Italia	Writing in the fourth century AD, Julius Obsequens preserved earlier reports in his Liber de prodigiis, including the appearance of a circular object resembling a clipeus ("shield") in the sky. Since Obsequens was compiling earlier sources rather than recording eyewitness testimony, historians generally treat the account as part of the Roman tradition of reporting prodigies.
CE 65	Burning shields	Roman Empire; Italia	In the Naturales quaestiones (I.15; VII.20.2), Seneca the Younger referred to clipei flagrantes ("flaming shields") and clipei ardentes ("burning shields") among luminous celestial phenomena, treating them as natural occurrences worthy of scientific investigation.
CE 65	Sky army	Roman Empire; Judaea	Romano-Jewish historian Flavius Josephus reported chariots "hurtling through the clouds" prior to the First Jewish–Roman War.
CE 196	Angel hair	Roman Empire; Rome, Italia	Historian Cassius Dio described a "fine rain resembling silver [that] descended from a clear sky upon the Forum of Augustus." He wrote that he was able to plate some of his bronze coins, but four days later, the silvery coating was gone.

== 8th–17th centuries ==
Date	Name	Location	Description
CE c. 740	Air ship of Clonmacnoise	Ireland; Teltown in County Meath, and Clonmacnoise in County Offaly	Several sets of Irish annals, those of Ulster, Tigernach, Clonmacnoise, and the Four Masters, have entries to the effect that "ships with their crews were seen in the air".
1561-04-14	1561 celestial phenomenon over Nuremberg	Holy Roman Empire; Nuremberg, Bavaria	Residents of Nuremberg described an aerial battle, followed by the appearance of "something like a black spear, very long and thick" (translation: Ilse Von Jacobi). A broadsheet recorded that witness accounts of hundreds of spheres, cylinders and other odd-shaped objects that moved erratically overhead.
1566-08-07	1566 celestial phenomenon over Basel	Switzerland; Basel, Basel	A broadsheet published in 1566 depicted numerous spherical objects appearing out of the Sun. The event was recorded and depicted by Samuel Coccius, "a student of the Holy Scripture and of the free arts, at Basel".
1609-09-22	Gwanghaegun period UFO Turmoil	Joseon (Korea); Gangwon Province	In 1609, multiple witnesses in Goseong, Wonju Gangneung, Chuncheon County and Yangyang County described a Halo or washbowl that was divided in two in the sky.

== 19th century ==
Date	Name	Location	Description
1883-08-12	Bonilla observation	Mexico; Zacatecas Observatory, Zacatecas	The astronomer José Bonilla photographed hundreds of dark objects crossing the Sun while observing sunspot activity at Zacatecas Observatory. Bonilla published an account of the event three years later in L'Astronomie.
1896-11-17 to 1897-04-23	Mystery airships	United States	Newspapers across California, and later other states, especially the Midwest, printed reports of strange airships and lights. Common elements of the descriptions included bright lights, cigar-shaped bodies, movable wings and a metallic hull.
1897-04-17	Aurora, Texas, UFO incident	United States; Aurora, Texas	Local correspondent S. E. Hayden reported the crash of an airship piloted by an alien. According to Hayden, the pilot was buried in the local cemetery. Residents of Aurora embrace the story without taking it seriously.

== 20th century ==
=== 1900–1949 ===
Date	Name	Location	Description
1907	Mihal Grameno UFO	Ottoman Empire; Albania	(Note: Written in The Albanian Uprising by Mihal Grameno a distinguished Albanian journalist, writer, and activist) "One night, while the fighters of Çerçiz were stationed at the top of a high mountain, a shiny object flew in front of us, stood suspended in the air for several minutes, and then disappeared."
1909	New Zealand airship sightings	New Zealand; Otago	Moving and whirring lights were reported in the sky around Otago. In the following months, many sightings were reported across New Zealand with varying descriptions of the craft and crew.
1917-08-13, 1917-09-13, 1917-10-13	Miracle of the Sun	Portugal; Fátima, Santarém District	Thousands of people gathered in Fátima based on reported Marian apparitions and claimed to see bizarre solar activity. Catholic bishop José Alves Correia da Silva declared the miracle "worthy of belief" on 13 October 1930, and the primarily Catholic witnesses described the event in religious terms. Despite the many photographers present in the crowd, no unusual photo of the Sun was captured. Later, Jacques Vallée, Joaquim Fernandes and Fina d'Armada would interpret it as a mass UFO sighting.
c. 1926	Nicholas Roerich UFO sighting	Tibet	During his Asian expedition, Russian theosophist Nicholas Roerich reported an oval in the sky above his caravan, which was later interpreted as a "flying saucer" by Roerich's Russian followers.
1933-06-01	Frank Smythe UFO sighting	China–Nepal border; Mount Everest in the Himalayas	During the 1933 Mount Everest expedition, Smythe witnessed two spots hovering and pulsating in the sky.
c. 1940s	Foo fighters	Over World War II theaters	During World War II, allied fighter pilots above Europe reported colorful balls of light following their aircraft at high speeds.
c. 1941	Cape Girardeau UFO legend	United States; Cape Girardeau, Missouri	A local legend gained wider attention in the 1980s when resident Charlotte Mann claimed in interviews that her father, Reverend William Huffman of the Red Star Baptist Church, had administered last rites for the dying crew of a crashed flying saucer.
1942-02-24	Battle of Los Angeles	United States; Los Angeles, California	Just months after the Japanese attack on Pearl Harbor, U.S. radar stations picked up an unidentified aerial object in the early morning. For several hours, anti-aircraft artillery fired thousands of rounds, and the LA Times reported that “the air over Los Angeles erupted like a volcano."
1945	Trinity UFO Case	United States; New Mexico	In 2003, two men began telling conflicting accounts of an avocado-shaped craft piloted by insectoid aliens crashing at the site of the first atomic bomb detonation. Despite a lack of evidence or internal consistency, the case was cited in the UFO investigation section of the National Defense Authorization Act for Fiscal Year 2023.
1946	The Ghost Rockets	Scandinavia and other parts of Europe	Thousands of UFO sightings were reported over Europe. Due in part to concerns that foreign governments were testing recovered experimental German technology, the Swedish and Greek governments investigated the reports separately.
1946-05-18	Ängelholm UFO memorial	Sweden; Ängelholm, Kristianstads County	Swedish entrepreneur Gösta Carlsson, attributed his success to a 1946 UFO encounter, that he commemorated with a concrete monument. Independent investigations did not verify his account.
1947-06-24	Kenneth Arnold UFO sighting	United States; North of Mount Rainier, Washington	Private pilot Kenneth Arnold was flying near Mount Rainier when he reported seeing a group of reflective craft moving at high speeds and flashing in the Sun like mirrors. Bill Bequette of the East Oregonian, who first interviewed Arnold, summarized the sighting as, "nine saucer-like aircraft flying in formation." This introduced the term flying saucers, and Arnold's sighting sparked an explosion of UFO reports around the country.
c. 1947	1947 flying disc craze	United States; Washington and other states	After the Kenneth Arnold sighting was reported in the news, over 800 similar sightings were reported throughout 1947.
1947-07-04	Flight 105 UFO sighting	United States; En route from Boise, Idaho to Pendleton, Oregon	A United Airlines crew including Captain Emil Smith, co-pilot Ralph Stephens, and flight attendant Marty Morrow witnessed nine unidentified objects. Believing them to be aircraft, Smith flashed the plane's landing lights intending to alert the objects, which he described as "smooth on the bottom and rough appearing on top".
1947-07-07	Rhodes UFO photographs	United States; Phoenix, Arizona	Inventor and amateur astronomer William Albert Rhodes took photographs of what he described as a silent grey object that appeared after a thunderstorm. The Air Force investigated the photographs and concluded that they showed airborne "paper swept up by the winds".
1947-07-08	The Roswell Incident	United States; about 30 mi. north of Roswell, New Mexico	Walter Haut, a United States Army Air Forces spokesperson, issued a press release announcing the "capture" of a "flying saucer". Hours later, the Army announced that the find was a crashed weather balloon. In 1978, the case regained attention after Jesse Marcel, the Army Officer who recovered the wreckage, told UFO researchers that the weather balloon explanation was a cover story. In 1994, the Air Force attributed the incident to the previously classified Project Mogul.
1947-07-29	Maury Island hoax	United States; Puget Sound near Maury Island, Washington	Fred Crisman mailed an account from employee Harold A. Dahl, along with a cigar box of metal wreckage, to Raymond A. Palmer who had previously published the Shaver Mystery stories. Dahl claimed that his dog was killed and his son was injured by debris in an encounter with six flying doughnut-shaped objects. He also reported that he was subsequently threatened by Men in Black. On July 31, 1947, Palmer arranged a meeting between Crisman, Dahl, Air Force investigators, and flying saucer witnesses Kenneth Arnold & Emil Smith.
c. 1948	The Green Fireballs	United States; New Mexico and other parts of the Southwestern United States	The US Air Force investigated reports of green flares streaking across the sky after an Air Force C-47 transport encountered a green ball of fire on 5 December 1948. The pilot, Captain Goede, described the object as larger than a meteor and not arching downward as a meteor would. The Air Force investigation was inconclusive.
1948-01-07	Mantell UFO incident	United States; Kentucky	Captain Thomas F. Mantell, a Kentucky Air National Guard pilot, died in the crash of his P-51 Mustang fighter plane near Franklin, Kentucky, United States, after being sent in pursuit of an unidentified flying object. While following the object, he climbed beyond 25,000 feet (7,600 m) and blacked out from a lack of oxygen. The military later identified the craft he was pursuing as likely a Skyhook weather balloon.
1948-03-25	Aztec, New Mexico UFO hoax	United States; New Mexico	Conmen Silas Newton and Leo Gebauer sold "magnetic oil-detecting machines" based on the story that they had replicated technology from a crashed spaceship. The pair were convicted of fraud in 1953. Elements of their story regarding a crashed ship with occupants were later entangled in the Roswell narrative.
1948-07-24	Chiles-Whitted UFO encounter	United States; Montgomery, Alabama	Clarence Chiles and John Whitted, American commercial pilots, reported that their airplane had nearly collided with a UFO near Montgomery. According to the pilots the object "looked like a wingless aircraft...it seemed to have two rows of windows through which glowed a very bright light, as brilliant as a magnesium flare."
1948-10-01	Gorman dogfight	United States; North Dakota	A US Air Force pilot sighted and pursued a UFO for 27 minutes over Fargo, North Dakota. According to US Air Force officer Edward J. Ruppelt, this was one of three cases, along with the Mantell incident and Chiles-Whitted encounter, that shifted the Air Force's attitude about UFO reports leading to the creation of Project Blue Book.
1949-10-14	Mount Palomar sightings	North America United States; Mount Palomar observatory	On October 14, 1949, an astronomer at Mount Palomar observatory saw a group of 16 to 18 shiny objects without wings and tails flying toward the northwest. At almost the same time, a Geiger counter in the powerhouse of the observatory suddenly jumped to its maximum reading for the first time. In the following week, further sightings occurred during which the Geiger counter reacted. In November 1949, the Naval Electronics Laboratory, which operated the Geiger counter, let some military planes equipped with radar fly over the observatory. Unlike the UFOs, the aircraft could not trigger the Geiger counter. Later tests discovered a malfunction of the Geiger counter in the form of a faulty fuse clip, which produced a signal when slightly jarred. However this could not explain why the aircraft could not trigger the Geiger counter. A physicist from Caltech suggested that the objects were conventional aircraft, but the astronomers who saw them were experienced with aircraft. The Air Force marked the case in Project Blue Book as unidentified .

=== 1950–1974 ===
Date	Name	Location	Description
1950-03-15 to 1950-03-18	Farmington New Mexico UFOs	Farmington, New Mexico	No photographs were taken, but there were approximately 50 to 100 sightings.
1950-05-11	McMinnville UFO photographs	United States; a farm near McMinnville, Oregon	A farmer took pictures of a purported "flying saucer". These were the first flying saucer photographs since the coining of the term.
1950-08-15	Mariana UFO incident	United States; Great Falls, Montana	The manager of Great Falls' pro baseball team took color film of two UFOs flying over Great Falls. The film was extensively analyzed by the US Air Force and several independent investigators.
1951-01-20	Sioux City mystery plane incident	United States; Sioux City, Iowa	Two pilots and a military officer passenger aboard a commercial DC-3 reported being buzzed by an unidentified straight-winged plane both larger and more maneuverable than a B-29.
1951-08-25	Lubbock Lights	United States; Lubbock, Texas	Several lights in V-shaped formations were repeatedly spotted flying over the city. Witnesses included W. I. Robinson, A. G. Oberg, and W. L. Ducker, professors of geology, chemical engineering, and petroleum engineering respectively. Teenage student Carl Hart Jr. photographed the lights
1952-01-29	Wonsan-Sunchon UFO incident	Korea; Wonsan and Sunchon	Four American military personnel aboard two different B-29 bombers reported seeing an orange globe-shaped light over two different cities in northern Korea
1952-07-12 to 1952-07-29	1952 Washington, D.C., UFO incident	United States; Washington, D.C.	A series of sightings accompanied radar contacts in the Washington area. These were the first sightings to be widely and seriously reported as potentially physical craft operated by intelligent life from another planet. In response, the CIA formed the Robertson Panel which advised Project Blue Book to "strip the Unidentified Flying Objects of the special status they have been given and the aura of mystery they have unfortunately acquired".
1952-07-14	Nash-Fortenberry UFO sighting	United States; Norfolk, Virginia	William B. Nash and William H. Fortenberry, pilots of a DC-4 airliner of Pan American Airways, radioed the Norfolk civil aviation authority to report eight large, round, glowing red objects.
1952-09-12	The Flatwoods Monster	United States; Flatwoods, West Virginia	Three local boys followed a bright object into the forest to what they believed was a UFO landing. They went to the nearby home of Kathleen May who accompanied them back to the spot along with two other children and teenage National Guardsman Eugene Lemon. In the forest, they smelled a foul odor and saw what May described as a tall figure with claws and "a head that resembled the ace of spades".
1954-09-10	Marius Dewilde sighting	France; Quarouble, Nord	French metalworker Marius Dewilde claimed to have become a contactee in 1954. Local newspapers and Radar magazine covered Dewilde's story of small humanoid figures landing a ship on the abandoned railroad tracks near his home. The coverage of Dewilde and other 1950s contactees spurred the careers of French ufologists Aimé Michel and Jacques Vallée.
1954-10-27	Fiorentina Stadium mass sighting	Italy; Stadio Artemio Franchi in Florence	A football game between Fiorentina and Pistoiese was under way at the Stadio Artemio Franchi when a group of UFOs traveling at high speed abruptly stopped over the stadium. The stadium became silent as the crowd of around 10,000 spectators witnessed the event and described the UFOs as cigar shaped.
1955-08-21 to 1955-08-22	Kelly–Hopkinsville encounter	United States; A farmhouse near Hopkinsville, Kentucky	At a rural farmhouse, eleven people witnessed creatures in the night. Two of the men opened fire with a shotgun and rifle, and the entire group later fled to the Hopkinsville police station. The creatures have been variously described as goblins, aliens, "little green men", owls, and circus monkeys. Four officers, five state troopers, three deputies, and four military police investigated the farmhouse finding bullet holes but no monsters. The story has had a broad impact on popular culture.
1956-07-24	Lakenheath-Bentwaters incident	United Kingdom; Suffolk, England	United States Air Force (USAF) and Royal Air Force (RAF) radar operators (from Lakenheath RAF Station, Bentwaters RAF Station, and Sculthorpe RAF Station) detected up to 15 objects over Suffolk. An RAF pilot was sent out from Waterbeach RAF Station in a de Havilland Venom, a jet aircraft with aircraft interception radar. The pilot reported spotting the object on radar and visually observing a luminous white object that moved behind his craft when he attempted to intercept.
1956-08-13	Elizabeth Klarer	South Africa; Drakensberg	A series of photos depicting a supposed UFO were taken on 24 July near Rosetta in the Drakensberg region. The photographer, meteorologist Elizabeth Klarer, claimed detailed adventures with an alien race including having had an alien lover, Akon, who would have fathered her son Ayling.
1957-05-03	Gordon Cooper UFO Sightings	United States; Edwards Air Force Base, California	Gordon Cooper, one of the original Project Mercury astronauts, witnessed a type of metallic craft without wings flying over Germany in the 1950s. At the time, Cooper believed these to be Soviet aircraft. His attitude later changed after an incident at Edwards Air Force Base. Cooper sent a crew of James Bittick and Jack Gettys out to a dry lakebed to set up data-recording photography equipment. Cooper said the two men, both familiar with experimental aircraft, came back shaken and talking about witnessing a wingless aircraft with retractable legs silently land and take off near them. Cooper reported the incident to The Pentagon which asked for all photographs of the craft. Cooper looked at the photos before sending them off and believed that the government covered up a UFO encounter.
1957-05-20	Milton Torres 1957 UFO Encounter	United Kingdom; East Anglia	U.S. Air Force fighter pilot Milton Torres reports that he was ordered to intercept and fire on a UFO displaying "very unusual flight patterns" over East Anglia. Ground radar operators tracked what was believed to be an unidentified aircraft for some time before Torres' plane was scrambled to intercept.
1957-10-15	Antônio Vilas-Boas Abduction	Brazil; Near São Francisco de Sales, Minas Gerais	Law student Antônio Vilas-Boas described being abducted by humanoid aliens and taken aboard their egg-shaped craft. He also said that he was confined within a small round room where he was compelled to have sex with a four foot tall alien woman.
1957-11-02	Levelland UFO case	United States; Levelland, Texas	Drivers observed cigar-shaped lights above the highway, followed by electrical failures.
1957-11-04	Kirtland AFB UFO sighting	United States; Albuquerque, New Mexico	Through binoculars, two Civil Aeronautics Administration tower operators reported seeing an egg shape emitting a white light beneath it.
1961-04-18	Eagle River encounter	United States, Eagle River, Wisconsin	Plumber Joe Simonton reported three men in an unidentified craft landed outside his home. He reported giving the men water and in exchange receiving pancakes. The apparent absurdity of the case was divisive among UFO believers and Ufologist Jacques Vallee would cite the case's parallels to fairy lore in his rejection of the extra-terrestrial hypothesis.
1961-09-19	Betty and Barney Hill abduction	United States; South of Lancaster on Route 3, New Hampshire	The Hills reported the first alien abduction experience to be widely spread in English-language publications. While driving home, they observed a light move through the sky and land ahead of them. Barney Hill said that, against his will, he turned the car down a side road towards the light, where he found six small humanoid beings waiting for them. Betty Hill reported that they inserted a needle through her navel among other vaguely medical tests.
1963	Kallamishtez UFO incident	Albania; Kurvelesh	Residents of Kallamishtëz in the Kurvelesh region reported a bright object in the sky. Albanian authorities said that it was a new jet plane used by the Albanian Air Force.
1964-04-24	Lonnie Zamora incident	United States; Socorro, New Mexico	Police officer Lonnie Zamora investigated a roaring sound. Zamora and a nearby tourist found a craft that took off shortly after their arrival. The craft left impressions in the ground that did not aid in identification.
1964-05-23	Solway Firth Spaceman	United Kingdom; Cumbria, England	While on a day trip with his family, fireman Jim Templeton took a photo of his daughter, that when developed showed a mysterious figure in the background. Templeton believed it to be a "spaceman", but later analysis showed it was most likely his wife.
1964-09-22	Big Sur UFO	United States; Big Sur, California	An Air Force team filming a missile test are ordered to secrecy after recording objects apparently following a warhead and emitting flashes. In 1993, the project engineer publicly revealed they had filmed the deployment of decoy warheads.
1964-09-18 until 9-24	Dwikora Operation UFO incident	Surabaya, Indonesia	Officer Jacob Salatun—founder of the National Institute of Aeronautics and Space in Indonesia—wrote several books on UFOs and founded an organization to study UFO reports after he served as Minister of Industry. According to Salatun, one night during the Indonesia-Malaysia Confrontation, pilots reported seeing and shooting at a dark, mango-shaped craft with colored lights. Salatun claims that fragments of the military's shells struck individuals outside of their homes in Sidoarjo.
1965-06-04	Project Gemini UFO	Low Earth orbit; Above Hawaii	During Gemini 4, astronaut James McDivitt spotted a white cylinder with a protruding arm traveling in his orbit. McDivitt has said that it was impossible for him to assign scale to the object against the black background of space, saying that it could have been small enough to hold in his hands or "the size of the Empire State Building."
1965-09-03	The Incident at Exeter	United States; Exeter, New Hampshire	Numerous people reported pulsating UFOs in Exeter, New Hampshire. The events were the subject of The Incident at Exeter by John G. Fuller.
1965-07-1	The Valensole UFO incident	France; Valensole, Provence-Alpes-Côte d'Azur	French farmer, Maurice Massé, witnessed a spherical vehicle in his lavender field. He noticed and approached two individuals that he observed near the vehicle, but after one pointed a tube in his direction, he stood still feeling paralyzed. He described the beings as child-sized, pale, large-headed, with only holes where a mouth should be. Massé said that after they left in their vehicle, he was never again able to grow a healthy plant in the area where the craft had landed. He did not personally comment on the effect this had on him, saying, "One always says too much." His wife reported that the man was plagued with exhaustion for months, that he had confessed some type of communication to her, and that it was a "spiritual experience" for her husband.
1965-12-09	Kecksburg UFO incident	United States; Kecksburg, Pennsylvania	Local newspapers and newscasts reported a fireball observed in the skies over Kecksburg. According to some residents, they found an acorn-shaped object in the woods. The U.S. military closed off the area to investigate and reported no evidence of a crash. A model built for Unsolved Mysteries is kept on display by the fire department, which leads an annual UFO celebration.
1966-03-20	Michigan "swamp gas" UFO reports	United States; Dexter, Michigan and Hillsdale, Michigan	Two mass sightings above wetlands were dismissed at a press conference as "marsh gas".
1966-04-06	Westall UFO	Australia; Clayton South, Victoria	Several hundred students and school faculty from Westall High School watched an object land at the nearby Grange Reserve.
1966-08-20	Lead masks case	Brazil; Niterói, Rio de Janeiro	The bodies of two recently deceased men were found on a hillside in Rio de Janeiro. They wore raincoats and handmade lead masks. A mutual friend, Elcio Gomes, said that the men had been "scientific spiritualists", members of a religious group that attempted to contact extraterrestrials using hallucinogens.
1967-03-16	Malmstrom UFO incident	United States; Montana	A missile facility malfunction was claimed to be linked to a UFO report by Robert Salas.
1967-05-20	Falcon Lake Incident	Canada; Falcon Lake, Manitoba	Prospector Stefan Michalak attributed unusual burns on his body to a purported UFO sighting near Falcon Lake. Radiation tests done at Misericordia General Hospital came back negative. Higher levels of soil radiation at the area where Michalak said he was burned were traced to an underground vein of radium.
1967-08-29	Close encounter of Cussac	France; near Cussac, Auvergne	A 13-year-old boy and his younger sister reported an incident to their father, local police, and investigators. According to police reports, they witnessed a brilliant sphere and four small black occupants while herding cattle outside their village.
1967-09-4	1967 British flying saucer hoax	United Kingdom; Southern England	Apprentices from the Royal Aircraft Establishment constructed six fake flying saucers out of metal-clad fiberglass. They filled them with flour, water, and electronic components, and dropped the saucers off in fields during the night. When a Scotland Yard bomb disposal squad was called in, X-Ray tests revealed the presence of Eveready brand batteries, and the hoax was exposed.
1967-10-04	Shag Harbour UFO incident	Canada; Gulf of Maine near Shag Harbour, Nova Scotia	Royal Canadian Mounted Police and six civilians reported that a large illuminated object crashed into Shag Harbour. A Department of National Defence underwater search followed, but located no physical evidence.
1969-01-06	Jimmy Carter UFO incident	United States; Leary, Georgia	While governor of Georgia, future president Jimmy Carter filed a written report of a "luminous, not solid" light over Leary, Georgia in 1969.
1969-04-12	Finnish Air Force sighting	Finland; Pori	Finnish pilot Jouko Kuronen overheard a radio conversation between air traffic control and fighter pilot Tarmo Tukeva. Tukeva was ordered to investigate "seven balloons" visible from Kuronen's position in the sky. Kuronen described the objects as discs that accelerated in formation against the wind at speeds not feasible for balloons.
1969-09-1	Labor Day 1969 UFO Incident	United States; Berkshire County, Massachusetts	Four families with no prior connection alleged that they saw a UFO, were moved by a beam of light, and lost several hours of time. The Great Barrington Historical Society recognized the accounts as a "historical event" in 2015.
1969-09-08	Pudasjärvi sighting	Finland; Pudasjärvi	A taxi driver and his passengers observed about a dozen football-sized flying bright lights for half an hour between 1:25 and 1:50 a.m. on Sunday and Monday night, when the weather was partly cloudy. The lights varied in color, direction of flight, and speed. A larger light was also seen inside the clouds, estimated to be 170 meters in diameter. In one place, the light illuminated a room with dazzling brightness. The light was observed in many nearby towns.
1973-10-11	Pascagoula Abduction	United States; Pascagoula, Mississippi	Charles Hickson and Calvin Parker were fishing from a pier on the Pascagoula River when they say that they heard whirring sounds and witnessed a craft over 30 feet long with flashing lights. Both men say they were paralyzed and then taken by humanoids with "robotic slit-mouths" and "crab-like pincers".
1974-01-23	Berwyn Mountain UFO incident	United Kingdom; Llandrillo, Merionethshire, North Wales	An alleged UFO crash involving lights in the sky moments before a large impact shock. The cause of the incident was however soon revealed as a 3.5 magnitude earthquake.
1974-08-23	John Lennon UFO incident	United States; New York City, New York	Musician John Lennon and then-assistant May Pang report seeing a craft emitting lights that changed color in the night sky above their Manhattan penthouse. Lennon would later reference this experience in his song "Nobody Told Me".

=== 1975–1999 ===
Date	Name	Location	Description
1975-01-12	North Hudson Park UFO sightings	United States; North Bergen, New Jersey	George O'Barski reported seeing a dark object with lit windows near the Stonehenge building adjacent to North Hudson Park. His story was covered by ufologist Budd Hopkins and local newspapers.
1975-11-05	Travis Walton	United States; Near Turkey Springs in Apache-Sitgreaves National Forest, Arizona	Logger Travis Walton disappeared for over 5 days resulting in a police investigation of his coworkers. When questioned on where he had been, Walton said that he had been taken aboard a spacecraft by nearly human creatures. Walton's alien abduction account is the basis for the book The Walton Experience (1978), the film Fire in the Sky (1993), and the documentary "Alien Abduction: Travis Walton" (2022).
1976-09-17	1976 Tehran UFO incident	Iran; Tehran, Tehran province	A radar and visual sighting of a UFO over the capital of Iran, during early morning hours. Two Imperial Iranian Air Force F-4 Phantom II jet interceptors reported losing instrumentation and communications as they approached the object.
1977-09-20	Petrozavodsk phenomenon	Soviet Union, Finland, Lithuania, and Denmark	Residents of Petrozavodsk reported a giant glowing "jellyfish" of light (visible for over ten minutes) looming in the early morning sky. The light was seen and photographed in several Baltic Sea countries. In response to the phenomenon, the Soviet Union created a government program to study anomalous atmospheric phenomena. This program would later attribute the Petrozavodsk sightings to the secret night launch of the Kosmos 955 spy satellite. According to Soviet astrophysicist, Yuli Platov, sunlight can cause the giant plumes of gas and dust produced by rockets to glow, especially "in twilight hours, when the rocket streaks through sunlit regions and the observer is on the nighttime side of the Earth."
1977 to 1978	Operação Prato	Brazil; Colares, Pará	Residents of Colares believed that scars on their bodies were caused by aerial lights that they named Chupa Chupa (Sucker Sucker). In an attempt to ward off the lights, they held vigils, tended fires, and lit fireworks. The military launched Operação Prato (Operation Saucer) to investigate the lights and found no unusual phenomena.
1978-05-10	Emilcin Abduction	Poland; Emilcin, Lublin Voivodeship	Polish farmer Jan Wolski reported that while returning home, two "short, green-faced humanoid entities" wearing black overalls jumped onto his horse-drawn cart and started speaking an incomprehensible language. After about 1000 ft (300 m), he reported seeing a white flying object, from which an alien creature came out and invited Wolski inside. The farmer said that they examined him once inside.
1978-10-21	Valentich disappearance	Australia; Victoria	Frederick Valentich left Moorabbin Airport in a Cessna 182 Skylane, a single-engined light aircraft. At 7:06 pm, he began reporting a strange craft to Melbourne air traffic control. Valentich's last words were, "That strange aircraft is hovering on top of me again … it is hovering and it's not an aircraft." Neither the pilot nor the plane were ever found.
1978-12-06	Zanfretta UFO Incident	Italy; Torriglia, Genoa	Italian nightwatchman Pier Fortunato Zanfretta perceived a red, oval object and phoned his supervisor. During the call, he described non-human creatures that he said were attacking him. He was later found in a state of shock and his experience was adapted into a stage play.
1978-12-21 to 1978-12-30	Kaikoura lights	New Zealand; South Island	The crew of a cargo aircraft spotted lights above the Kaikōura Ranges on New Zealand's South Island. A news team from TV1 and Channel 0 arrived to record footage for a story about the sighting, and were able to capture the lights on camera. The New Zealand Department of Scientific and Industrial Research investigated and did not find evidence that the lights were solid objects.
1979-08-27	Val Johnson incident	United States; Marshall County, Minnesota	Sheriff Val Johnson attributed minor injuries and the shattered windshield of his squad car to a beam of light.
1979-11-09	Robert Taylor incident	United Kingdom; Livingston, West Lothian, Scotland	Forestry worker Robert Taylor was walking near Dechmont Law when he said that he saw a flying dome descend, was approached by floating spheres, smelled a foul odor similar to "burning brakes", and blacked out. Ufologists erected a plaque at the site. Physicians have noted that Taylor's account matches an episode of temporal lobe epilepsy.
1979-11-11	Manises UFO incident	Spain; Valencia, Valencian Community	En route to Las Palmas, commercial pilot Francisco Javier Lerdo de Tejada radioed air traffic control regarding a pair of red lights approaching his TAE Supercaravelle. Neither air traffic control in Barcelona nor the military identified the object. Tejada made an emergency landing at the nearby airport in Manises.
1980-04-11	Arequipa UFO incident	Peru; Arequipa Region	Early in the morning of April 11, La Joya Air Force Base ordered fighter pilot Oscar Santa María Huertas to intercept an object in restricted air space. Huertas pursued the object in a Sukhoi Su-22 and fired a barrage of 30mm shells into it. According to Huertas the object did not seem damaged and rose to 19,200 meters. He described it as similar in shape to an incandescent lightbulb with a much wider circular silver base and said that it "lacked all the typical components of aircraft. It had no wings, propulsion jets, exhausts, windows, antennae, and so forth".
1980-12-26 to 1980 -12-28	Rendlesham Forest incident	United Kingdom; Rendlesham Forest, Suffolk, England	United States Air Force personnel reported various unusual observations at RAF Woodbridge and RAF Bentwaters, two American air bases located in England. Their reports included lights in the sky, a metallic triangular object in the forest, multi-colored lights moving through the forest, and higher levels of radiation.
1980-12-29	Cash–Landrum incident	United States; near Dayton, Texas	Betty Cash and Victoria Landrum unsuccessfully sued the United States government in 1981. The two women attributed various symptoms to a diamond-shaped UFO they claimed to have seen pursued by air force helicopters the previous year. The judge dismissed their case due to a lack of evidence.
1981-01-08	Trans-en-Provence case	France; Trans-en-Provence, Provence-Alpes-Côte d'Azur	Retired contractor, Renato Nicolai reported the landing of a flying object near his home to local police. Renato believed it to be a military craft. Groupe d'Étude des Phénomènes Aérospatiaux Non-identifiés (GEPAN), a branch of French Space Agency created to investigate UFOs, conducted an investigation, photographed circular impressions on the ground, and took samples of the area. Skeptics have been critical of the GEPAN investigation which took place 40 days after the initial sighting.
c. 1983	Hudson Valley Sightings	United States; Hudson Valley, New York	State police discovered that widespread reports of a massive object—described by one observer as a "city of lights" hanging silently above their home—were caused by a group of pilots flying small aircraft in formation. The events were the subject of an Unsolved Mysteries episode and Night Siege, a posthumous collaboration between ufologists including J. Allen Hynek.
1986-05-19	"Night of the UFOs" in Brazil	Brazil; São Paulo, Rio de Janeiro, Minas Gerais and Goiás	Radar and visual contacts were obtained with multiple 'bright colorful objects' in the sky across several states. Mirage IIIE and F-5 fighters were scrambled but failed to intercept, with pilots describing the objects as capable of impossible maneuvers and rapidly accelerating to as much as Mach 15 once approached.
1986-11-17	Japan Air Lines Cargo Flight 1628 incident	United States; Alaska	While piloting a Japanese Boeing 747-200F cargo aircraft on a polar route from France to Narita International Airport in Japan, the flight crew witnessed several unidentified objects over eastern Alaska. Captain Kenju Terauchi (寺内謙寿, Terauchi Kenju), co-pilot Takanori Tamefuji (為藤隆憲, Tamefuji Takanori), and flight engineer Yoshio Tsukuda (佃善雄, Tsukuda Yoshio) reported rectangular arrays of what Captain Terauchi described as glowing nozzles or thrusters.
1987-12-1	Ilkley Moor UFO incident	United Kingdom; Ilkley Moor	Retired police officer, Philip Spencer, took a photograph of what he said was a strange being on the moor. According to Spencer, the being fled after being photographed and left in a domed craft.
1987 to 1988	Gulf Breeze UFO incident	United States; Gulf Breeze, Florida	Florida contractor Ed Walters took a series of photographs that he claimed were of a spacecraft piloted by alien creatures that paralyzed him with a blue beam of light. After Walters moved, the next homeowners found a small model that resembled the purported spacecraft. The model had been hidden beneath insulation in the attic. Newspaper photographers were able to "nearly duplicate" Walters' photographs using the model.
1989-09-27	Voronezh UFO incident	Soviet Union; Voronezh	In the early days of glasnost, the Russian state news agency TASS reported a sensationalist tale from 3 schoolchildren who said a glowing "banana-shaped" object landed in a park where a "three-eyed creature, about nine feet tall and fashionably dressed in silvery overalls and bronze boots and with a disk on its chest" exited with its robot. Tass reported common hematite at the park as rocks that "cannot be found on Earth".
1990-08-04	Calvine UFO	United Kingdom; Perthshire, Scotland	Sighting of an UFO near Calvine in Scotland in August 1990. The object was photographed.
1994-03-08	1994 Michigan UFO event	United States; Western Michigan	Several hundred residents reported something resembling flickering Christmas lights in the sky. Religious residents interpreted them as a sign of the Biblical "end times". The Holland, Michigan police department contacted the National Weather Service who reported unusual radar blips. Aircraft were ruled out, but the specific cause of the lights was not determined.
1994-09-16	Ariel School UFO incident	Zimbabwe; Ruwa	Over sixty students reported seeing a silver craft land in a field near the school. They described occupants dressed in all black that exited the silver object.
1996-01-20	Varginha UFO incident	Brazil; Varginha, Minas Gerais	In 1996, various individuals reported possibly unrelated incidents with what they described as UFOs, creatures, and the Brazilian military. The events are the inspiration for saucer-shaped Varginha water tower, the Nave Espacial de Varginha; the 1998 Brazilian video game Incidente em Varginha; and 1996, a film by director Rodrigo Brandão.
1997-03-13	Phoenix Lights	United States; Phoenix, Arizona	Many residents photographed lights in a "V" pattern moving through Arizona, during a night that the Air National Guard stationed in Tucson, Arizona, were conducting training exercises.

== 21st century ==
Date	Name	Location	Description
2000-10-05	Bonsall UFO sighting	United Kingdom; Bonsall, Derbyshire	Resident, Sharon Rowlands, filmed a luminous object in the night sky starting around 9:15 pm and continuing for several minutes. Various other residents reported strange lights including a man who described a "pink glow, vertically shaped like a shoe box".
2004-03-05	2004 Mexican UFO incident	Mexico; Campeche	Mexican Air Force pilots filmed (initially unidentified) lights in the sky using infrared cameras while searching for drug-smuggling planes. Multiple subsequent investigations identified these as massive burn-off flares from a cluster of off-shore oil platforms in the Bay of Campeche.
2004-10-31	Tinley Park Lights	United States; Illinois	On Halloween night (2004), residents were outside trick-or-treating on the streets of Tinley Park and other Chicago suburbs, when thousands of people watched, photographed, and filmed a formation of red lights above them.
2004-11-14	USS Nimitz UFO incident	United States; Off the coast of San Diego, California	Several pilots from VFA-41 squadron flying Super Hornets from the USS Nimitz, were directed by the USS Princeton to intercept one of several unidentified flying objects detected by radar. The pilots reported a visual encounter and recorded an infrared video. The Navy has verified that the video was taken by Navy personnel and has stated that it has not yet identified the nature of the sightings which they classify as unexplained aerial phenomena.
2006-11-07	2006 O'Hare International Airport UFO sighting	United States; Chicago, Illinois	United Airlines employees and pilots reported sightings of a saucer-shaped, unlit craft hovering over a Chicago O'Hare Airport terminal, before appearing to leave with a rapid vertical rise.
2007-04-23	2007 Alderney UFO sighting	Bailiwick of Guernsey; Alderney	On separate flights, two airline pilots and multiple passengers reported a "sunlight-coloured" object off the coast of Alderney. One of the pilots, Ray Bowyer, filed a report with Britain’s Civil Aviation Authority upon landing.
2007-11-28 to 2011-12-13	Dudley Dorito	United Kingdom; West Midlands conurbation	The "Dudley Dorito" refers to a series of black triangle sightings reported in the West Midlands conurbation.
2008-06-20	Wales UFO sightings	United Kingdom; Various cities, Wales	Over the Bristol Channel, a South Wales Police helicopter took evasive actions to avoid what the crew described as a saucer-shaped UFO.
2009-01-05	Morristown UFO hoax	United States; Morristown, New Jersey	In the evening, citizens in Morristown and other town in Morris County, New Jersey saw five red lights in the sky. After three months, two men from the Morristown area announced that they had organized a UFO hoax, meant as a "social experiment".
2009-12-10	2009 Norwegian spiral anomaly	Norway; Trøndelag and Northern Norway	A failed Russian missile test produced a massive spiral light in the sky, visible from the northern counties of Norway and parts of Sweden.
2010-01-25	Harbour Mille incident	Canada; Harbour Mille, Newfoundland and Labrador	At least three UFOs that looked like missiles but emitted no noise were spotted over Harbour Mille.
2010-07-07	Hangzhou Airport UFO	China; Hangzhou, Zhejiang	Hangzhou Xiaoshan International Airport was shut down for an hour after reports of an alleged unidentified flying object near the airport.
2014-06-02 to 2015-03-10	USS Theodore Roosevelt UFO incidents	United States; East Coast of the United States	Navy pilots from the Theodore Roosevelt began to notice unexplained objects on their radar after an equipment upgrade. Some pilots were unable to see the objects. Others captured video footage, later released to the public. The pilots reported these incidents to the then-obscure Advanced Aerospace Threat Identification Program resulting in new guidelines regarding unexplained aerial phenomena sightings.
c. 2020	Jetpack man	United States; Los Angeles, California	The FBI and Federal Aviation Administration investigated reports from multiple professional pilots who, beginning in 2020, began to report something hovering over Los Angeles that looked like a man wearing a jet pack. Investigators said that it was unlikely to be a person and more likely to be a balloon or dummy attached to a drone.
2023-01-28 to 2023-02-13	List of high-altitude object events in 2023	United States, Canada, Colombia, Costa Rica, and Venezuela	Multiple airborne objects, sometimes reported as UFOs, were observed and shot down by military aircraft. Many of the objects were identified as meteorology or espionage balloons.
2023-02-15	Ukrainian military cigar-shaped UAP observation	Ukraine; central Ukraine	Ukrainian military researchers described a single vertical, cigar-shaped UAP recorded by a Bayraktar UAV. They listed its size as 0.3–0.5 m, velocity as 250 m/s, altitude as 200–300 m, and reference as Figure 9.b.
2024-11-20 to 2024-11-26	2024 US air base drone incursions in the United Kingdom	United Kingdom	Unauthorized drones were reported near four US Air Force bases in the United Kingdom (RAF Lakenheath, RAF Mildenhall, RAF Feltwell, and RAF Fairford) by pilots, air traffic controllers, and aviation enthusiasts.
December 2024	2024 United States drone sightings	United States	A large number of sightings of lights in the sky over New Jersey and other states, primarily in the Northeastern United States. The reported objects were generally referred to as "drones", and thousands of sightings were reported. The US Air Force denied any responsibility for the events.
2023-04-19	AARO Middle East 2022 MQ-9 orb video	Middle East	At a Senate Armed Services Subcommittee hearing, AARO director Sean Kirkpatrick presented an MQ-9 infrared clip from July 12, 2022 that showed a small metallic orb crossing the sensor field of view. AARO said the object did not display anomalous behavior given the limited data.
2023-05-31	NASA public meeting Western U.S. objects video	United States, western range	At NASA's public UAP meeting, AARO played a 2021 infrared range clip known as Western U.S. Objects and correlated the dots with commercial flight tracks. AARO's case resolution stated the targets were three distant airliners and posted a technical note.
2024-02-24	Ukrainian military disc or cigar-shaped UAP observation	Ukraine; Ukrainian war zone	Ukrainian military researchers described a single disc- or cigar-shaped UAP. They listed its size as 26.4–32.4 m, velocity as 0 m/s, altitude as 105 m, and reference as Figure 8.b.
February or March 2024 (specific date unknown)	Ukrainian military wedge-shaped UAP formation	Ukraine; Ukrainian war zone	Ukrainian military researchers described a formation of five spherical UAP. They listed the objects' size as 1.2–6 m, velocity as 7.3–36.5 m/s, altitude as 100–200 m, and reference as Figure 8.a.
2024-03-26	Ukrainian military spherical UAP formation	Ukraine; Ukrainian war zone	Ukrainian military researchers described a formation of four spherical UAP. They listed the objects' size as 1.3–2.7 m, velocity as 20–42 m/s, altitude as 50–100 m, and reference as Figure 10.b.
2024-03-28	Ukrainian military in-line spherical UAP formation	Ukraine; Ukrainian war zone	Ukrainian military researchers described an in-line formation of four spherical UAP. They listed the objects' size as 2–2.9 m, velocity as 76.2–110.8 m/s, altitude as 100–150 m, and reference as Figure 9.a.
2025-09-09	Yemen orb missile engagement video	Yemen, off the coast	At a House Oversight hearing, a congressman played MQ-9 footage from 30 October 2024 that he said showed a Hellfire missile striking a bright orb and the orb continuing unaffected.
2026-05-31	Campo Largo case	Brazil; Campo Largo, Paraná	A digital influencer released videos and reports of unusual lights and sounds observed from his farm.

== By location ==
The lists below contain UFO reports mentioned above, along with less notable UFO reports from the specific areas.

- Africa
- Albania
- Argentina
- Australia
- Belarus
- Belgium
- Brazil
- Canada
- Canary Islands
- China
- Czech Republic
- France
- Greece
- India
- Indonesia
- Iran
- Italy
- Mexico
- Nepal
- New Zealand
- Norway
- Outer space
- Poland
- Russia
- South Africa
- Spain
- Sweden
- United Kingdom
- United States

== See also ==
- Table of reports during the 1947 flying disc craze – A sortable table of the hundreds of 1947 flying disc sightings.
- List of alleged extraterrestrial beings – A list of entities reported in conjunction with UFOs and believed by witnesses to be alien in origin, unrelated to astrobiology or xenobiology.
- List of UFO religions
- List of investigations of UFOs by governments
- List of UFO organizations – Private organizations that investigate UFO sightings.
- Extraterrestrial hypothesis – The proposal that UFO sightings are observations of physical craft piloted by biological aliens from another planet.
- Interdimensional hypothesis – The proposal that UFO sightings are the result of experiences with another dimension.
- Psychosocial hypothesis – The proposal that UFO sightings can be explained by social and psychological processes.
- Time-traveler hypothesis – The proposal that UFO sightings can be interpreted as advanced humans traveling from the future.
- United States UFO files – Collection of declassified United States government records concerning UFOs
