= UFO sightings in India =

List of alleged UFO sightings in the nation of India

This is a list of alleged sightings of UFOs in India.

== 1951 ==
- In New Delhi, members of a flying club reported a 100-foot-long (30-metre) cigar-shaped object in the sky.

== 2004 ==
- On 27 September 2004, a team of scientists in Samudra Tapu spotted a white object resembling a "snow man" on top of an adjacent mountain ridge. India Today speculated the UFO could be "a spy drone from across the border" or "a spy balloon".

== 2007 ==
- In October, a strange "fireball" was photographed in the skies of Kolkata. It was reported to be a shape-shifting anomaly.

== 2013 ==
- In June, residents in Chennai observed five specks of bright orange light in the night sky.
- In August, troops of the Indian Army spotted several UFOs near the Ladakh border.

== 2015 ==
- In Gorakhpur, Uttar Pradesh, a local resident claimed to have taken a photo of a large UFO. However, a rash of similar photos from other parts of the world depicting the appearance of a UFO similar to the one in the movie Independence Day were most likely "created using digital editing software or even a mobile phone app, as some on the market allow UFOs to be blended into pictures".
- In June, a boy from Kanpur, Uttar Pradesh, was using his father's phone to take photos of clouds when he reportedly captured an image of a flying saucer.

== 2023 ==
- In November, a UFO was spotted over Imphal Airport, which disrupted flight services for three hours. Two Indian Air Force Rafale fighter jets were scrambled from a nearby air base. The search yielded no result, and the unidentified objects were not seen again.

== See also ==
- List of reported UFO sightings
