= UFO sightings in Belarus =

This is a list of alleged sightings of unidentified flying objects or UFOs in Belarus.

== 1985 ==
- In 1985, it was reported that an Aeroflot plane en route from Tbilisi to Tallinn had been "escorted" by a bright light while flying over Minsk. The Soviet military suggested the sightings were due to the effect of atmospheric phenomena on electromagnetic waves.

== See also ==
- List of reported UFO sightings
