= UFO sightings in Nepal =

This is a list of alleged sightings of unidentified flying objects or UFOs in Nepal.

== 25 March 1968 ==
At around 8.15 pm the residents of Batulechaur in Pokhara, witnessed ‘a blazing object, flashing intermittently, accompanied by big thunder sound disintegrated over Kaski region. A huge metallic disk shaped object with a six foot in base and 4 feet in height was found in crater in Baltichaur five miles NE of Pokhara. A portion of a similar object was found at Talakot and Turepasal’ This is recorded in the CIA book. In the book Moon Dust, Kevin D. Randle writes, "The American embassy in Kathmandu, in a secret message dated July 23, alerted the 1127th USAF Field Activities Group, which had once been the 4602d, and the 1006th at Fort Belvoir, that they expected full cooperation with the government of Nepal. The subject of the message was…MOON DUST".

== 20 March 2020 ==
In Gandaki province a bright "burning" object flying towards the Earth followed by a crashing sound was recorded.

== See also ==
- List of reported UFO sightings
