= UFO sightings in Iran =

List of alleged UFO sightings within the nation of Iran

This is a list of alleged sightings of unidentified flying objects or UFOs in Iran.

== 1976 ==
- The 1976 Tehran UFO incident was a radar and visual sighting of an unidentified flying object (UFO) over Tehran, the capital of Iran. The incident is particularly notable for apparent electromagnetic interference effects on aircraft near the UFO. Two F-4 jet interceptors independently lost instrumentation and communications as they approached, only to have these restored when they left. One F-4 also lost its weapons systems when it was about to fire on the object. The incident is well documented in a U.S. Defense Intelligence Agency (DIA) report with a distribution list that included the White House, Secretary of State, Joint Chiefs of Staff, National Security Agency (NSA), and Central Intelligence Agency (CIA). At least one of the pilots directly involved with the events stated his openness to the hypothesis that the object had a non-terrestrial provenance, due to what he perceived as an anomalous rate of acceleration.

== 1982 ==
- In 1982, a UFO sighting was documented in Isfahan. It was reportedly a mass sighting involving thousands of witnesses; however, it was stated that no explanation was offered by officials.

== 2003 ==
- In August 2003, two tourists witnessed a pair of white luminous UFOs with blue and yellow beams near the Caspian Sea.

== 2004 ==
- Between 12–21 April 2004, unidentified objects were sighted by thousands of witnesses. Some of the anomalies were reportedly ovoid in shape. Various conventional explanations were offered for the flap, such as surveillance aircraft or a misidentification of the planet Venus. A journalist with the Islamic Republic News Agency (IRNA) was able to capture footage of one of the events.

== 2005 ==
- A tourist claimed to have seen a UFO hovering near the Tomb of Cyrus the Great.

== 2007 ==
- Eyewitnesses told the Fars News Agency (FNA) that a radiant UFO had crashed in the Jebal Barez mountains of Kerman on the morning of 10 January 2007. Abulghassem Nasrollahi, the then-Deputy Governor-General of the Kerman province, reported that all the aircraft in the area had been accounted for, but did not rule out the possibility that the object could have been a meteor. Another source also told the FNA that the object was on fire with thick smoke coming from it, and claimed that this precluded the meteor hypothesis. However, meteors appear as bright fireballs in the sky, as they are heated to high temperatures due largely to ram pressure as they fall at high speeds through the Earth's atmosphere. Meteors often burn up completely before reaching the ground, and some leave a smoke-like trail in their wake above an altitude of 20 kilometres (12 mi). Abulghassem noted that a few days earlier, in Rafsanjan, a similar incident was reported by witnesses.

== See also ==
- List of reported UFO sightings
