= Table of reports during the 1947 flying disc craze =

Table of 1947 flying disc reports

Animation of reports during the flying disc craze

Over 800 reports were made publicly during the 1947 flying disc craze. Such reports quickly spread throughout the United States, and some sources estimate the reports may have numbered in the thousands.

== Table ==
Table of Reports, Jun 25 - Jul 21
Report publish date	Location	Date of claimed sighting	Name	Notes	Bloecher # ^{[A]}
Jun 25	Mineral, Washington	Jun 24	Kenneth Arnold	Nine objects	#39
Jun 26	Oklahoma City, Oklahoma	May 15	Byron Savage		I-1
Jun 26	Eugene, Oregon	Jun 18	E.H. Sprinkle	Nine objects, photographed,	#13
Jun 26	In Cascade Mts, Oregon	Jun 24	Fred Johnson		#30
Jun 26	Pendleton, Oregon	Jun 24	Glen E Stewart		#44
Jun 26	Kansas City, Missouri	Jun 25	W. I. Davenport	Nine objects	#52
Jun 27	Bremerton, Washington	Jun 17	Elma Shingler (Emma Shingler)		#10
Jun 27	Bremerton, Washington	Jun 17	Mrs. Howard K. Wheeler		#11
Jun 27	Wenatchee, Washington	Jun 20	Archie Edes		#18
Jun 27	Bremerton, Washington	Jun 24	Elma Shingler (Emma Shingler)		#31
Jun 27	Bellingham, Washington	Jun 24	George Clover		#32
Jun 27	Yakima, Washington	Jun 24	Ethel Wheelhouse		#41
Jun 27	Salem, Oregon	Jun 24	Mrs. Dennis Howell		#42
Jun 27	Portland, Oregon	Jun 24	William Kamp		#45
Jun 27	Seattle, Washington	Jun 24	Elvira Forsyth		#46
Jun 27	Seattle, Washington	Jun 24	Elvira Forsyth		#47
Jun 27	Seattle, Washington	Jun 24	Elvira Forsyth		#48
Jun 27	Seattle, Washington	Jun 25	M F Bly		#62
Jun 27	Oklahoma City, Oklahoma	Jun 26	Dennis E Donovan		#66
Jun 28	Colorado Springs (Manitou Springs), Colorado	May 19	Seven railway workers	Grudge #92	
Jun 28	Kelso, Washington	Jun 20	Mrs Jerry Neels		#16
Jun 28	El Paso, Texas	Jun 22	G. Oliver Dickson		#23
Jun 28	Joilet, Illinois	Jun 24	Charles Kastl	Nine objects,	#33
Jun 28	Lonejack, Missouri	Jun 24	Lester Swingleson		#34
Jun 28	Emmett, Idaho	Jun 24			#36
Jun 28	Seattle, Washington	Jun 24	Mrs. E.G. Peterson		#84
Jun 28	Silver City, New Mexico	Jun 25	R. F. Sensenbaugher, C.B. Munroe		#60
Jun 28	Cedar City, Utah	Jun 26	Roy Walters		#68
Jun 28	Cedar City, Utah	Jun 26	Royce R. Knight		#69
Jun 28	Cedar City, Utah	Jun 26	Charles Moore		#70
Jun 28	Houston, Texas	Jun 27	Laveta Davidson		#73
Jun 28	St. Augustine Pass, New Mexico	Jun 27	Capt. E.B. Detchmendy	Fireballs IDed as meteors by Col. Turner,	#74
Jun 28	Hope, New Mexico	Jun 27	W.C. Dodd	Fireballs IDed as meteors by Col. Turner,	#75
Jun 28	Shiprock, New Mexico	Jun 27	Dr R L Hopkins		#81
Jun 28	Tularosa, New Mexico	Jun 27			#82
Jun 28	Engle, New Mexico	Jun 27	Captain Dyvad	Fireballs IDed as meteors by Col. Turner,	#83
Jun 28	Woodland, Washington	Jun 27	Clyde Homan		#85
Jun 28	Kelso, Washington	Jun 27			#89
Jun 28	Desert between Twin Falls and Boise, Idaho	Jun 27	Lloyd Meldin		
Jun 29	Salem, Oregon	Jun 17	Gertrude Kirkpatrick		#49
Jun 29	Salem, Oregon	Jun 17	William Bond		#54
Jun 29	Diamond Gap, Washington	Jun 24	Robert W. Huback		#35
Jun 29	Salmon, Washington	Jun 24	Forrest lookout		
Jun 29	Del Rio, Texas	Jun 26	Unnamed resident		
Jun 29	San Antonio, Texas	Jun 27	Mrs. W.B. Cummings		#71
Jun 29	Van Horn, Texas	Jun 27	J.E. Shelton		#72
Jun 29	Bisbee, Arizona	Jun 27	John A Petsche, John C. Rylance, I.W. Maxwell, Milton Luna		#79
Jun 29	Bellingham, Washington	Jun 27	Edward Van Soest		
Jun 29	Vancouver, British Columbia	Jun 27	William Crodle		
Jun 29	Seaside, Oregon	Jun 28	Mrs. Sidney B. Smith		#99
Jun 29	Olympia, Washington	Jun 28	George Barner		
Jun 30	Richmond, Virginia	Jun 3	Samuel S. Trotter	Meteorologist receiving reports of unusual lights "Past three weeks"	
Jun 30	Grand Canyon, Arizona	Jun 26	Mrs. Leon Oetinger,Carol Street	Grudge #78,	#65
Jun 30	Logan, Utah	Jun 26	Glen Bunting		#67
Jun 30	Pendelton, Oregon	Jun 26	Bill Schuening		
Jun 30	Gallup, New Mexico	Jun 27	Art Roberts		#87
Jun 30	Vancouver, British Columbia	Jun 27	William Crodie		#88
Jun 30	Cliff, New Mexico	Jun 28	Arthur Howard	Crash with "stinking air",	#105
Jun 30	Pendelton, Oregon	Jun 28	Mrs. Morton Elder		#107
Jun 30	El Paso, Texas	Jun 28	Henry Kondo		
Jun 30	Ottawa, Ontario	Jun 29	H.S. Gauthier		#104
Jun 30	Moscow, Idaho	Jun 29	Frank Lark,Lewis Cook, Ernest Heilman		#111
Jun 30	San Leandro, California	Jun 29	Frank M. King (Frank H. King)		#114
Jun 30	Gallup, New Mexico	Jun 29	Mrs. B.A. Tillery		#56
Jun 30	El Paso, Texas	Jun 29	R.C Burgess		
Jul 1	Bakersfield, California	Jun 23	Richard Rankin		#26
Jul 1	Alvarado, Texas	Jun 25			#55
Jul 1	Salt Take City, Utah	Jun 25			#57
Jul 1	Salt Lake City, Utah	Jun 25	Homer B. Duncan, Mack McKague		#58
Jul 1	Dallas, Texas	Jun 25	Mrs. Randy C. Johnson		#97
Jul 1	Dallas, Texas	Jun 28	Mrs R C Johnson		#100
Jul 1	Los Angeles, California	Jun 28	Tony Shaputis		#92
Jul 1	La Grande, Oregon	Jun 28	Leland Jones		#94
Jul 1	Smyer, Texas	Jun 29			#103
Jul 1	Lubbock, Texas	Jun 29	Mrs. Cuba Womack		
Jul 1	Elephant Butte, New Mexico	Jun 29	Troy Pendergrass	Recovered debris identified as tinfoil	
Jul 1	Spokane, Washington	Jun 30	John Mourning, David Allen		#118-9
Jul 1	Galena Summit, Idaho	Jun 30	Hunter Nelson, Walter Nicholson	Eight to ten objects,	#120
Jul 1	Lewiston, Idaho	Jun 30	Bernice Marvel		
Jul 1	Bath, South Carolina	Jun 30	Jack Reames		
Jul 2	Hot Springs, New Mexico	Jun 20	Annabel Mobley, Luanne Mobley		#17
Jul 2	Bakersfield, California	Jun 24	Richard Rankin	Ten objects,	#25-26
Jul 2	Boise, Idaho	Jun 24	Donald Whitehead, J.M. Lampert	Lt. Governor,	#38
Jul 2	Capitan, New Mexico	Jun 27	Cummins, Erv Dill		#77
Jul 2	Bisbee, Arizona	Jun 27	George P Wilcox		#78
Jul 2	San Angelo, Texas	Jun 29	Mrs. Victor L. Salter		
Jul 2	Malta, Idaho	Jun 29	Mrs. J.F. Meuser		
Jul 2	Sherman, Texas	Jun 29	Mrs. L.M. Wagoner		
Jul 2	Spokane, Washington	Jun 30	David Allen		#119
Jul 2	Portland, Oregon	Jul 1	Herbert Balliet	"At least ten" objects,	#135
Jul 2	Madras, Oregon	Jul 1	Mrs. R.A. Hunt	"Six objects",	#136
Jul 2	Salt Lake City, Utah	Jul 1	Lynn Wallace		#137
Jul 2	Fort Stevens, Oregon	Jul 1	Mrs. Earl Seado		#138
Jul 2	Pendleton, Oregon	Jul 1	Mrs. Walter Clark		#139
Jul 2	Louisville, Kentucky	Jul 1	J.L.Laemmie (Laemmle)		#146
Jul 2	Louisville, Kentucky	Jul 1	E.E. Unger		#151
Jul 2	Albuquerque, New Mexico	Jul 1	Max Hood		#152
Jul 2	Lewiston, Idaho	Jul 2	Mrs. Lloyd Bergh		#155
Jul 3	Douglas, Arizona	Jun 10	Coral Lorenzen		#8
Jul 3	Roseville, California	Jun 24	Viola M. Wind		#43
Jul 3	Salt Lake City, Utah	Jun 26	Edna Johnson	IDed as meteor by astronomer,	
Jul 3	San Miguel, Texas	Jun 27	Mrs. David Appelzoller	Whistling, potential landing,	#76
Jul 3	Bisbee, Arizona	Jun 27	John A Petsche John C		#80
Jul 3	Bath, South Carolina	Jun 28	Jack Reams		#101
Jul 3	Astoria, Oregon	Jun 30	Jack Hayes		#117
Jul 3	Tupelo, Arkansas	Jun 30	T A Norris		#121
Jul 3	Summerside, Prince Edward Island	Jul 1	C.K. Gunn		#133
Jul 3	Dallas, Texas	Jul 1	Tom Dean		#134
Jul 3	Phoenix, Arizona	Jul 1	Frank Nunn		#150
Jul 3	San Francisco, California	Jul 2	David Menary	California Highway Patrol, IDed as fireworks by Army,	#158
Jul 3	North Bend, Washirgton	Jul 2	H H Bowman		#159
Jul 3	Beverly Hills, California	Jul 2	Mrs. Ernest Michel		#172
Jul 3	Wichita, Kansas	Jul 2	Florence Thorton, Neil Lane, Howard Wilson		
Jul 3	Denver, Colorado	Jul 2	Henry Martin, Walter Harrod		
Jul 3	Klamath Falls, Oregon	Jul 2	Don Bradley, Harold Clemenson		
Jul 3	Altadena, California	Jul 2	Mrs. D.R. Congdon	'Mystery missile' landed with thud, not found. Witness says NOT a "flying disc"	
Jul 3	Denver, Colorado	Jul 3	William F LeFevre		#184
Jul 3	Monteray, California	Jul 3	Louise Golstein		
Jul 4	Richfield, Idaho	Jun 20	Charles Housel, Sherman Coffman		
Jul 4	Northport, Nebraska	Jun 23	Hanna Smith		
Jul 4	Twin Falls, Idaho	Jun 26	R.L. Dempsey		
Jul 4	Tucson, Arizona	Jun 29	Charles O. Weaver		#110
Jul 4	Wichita, Kansas	Jun 30	Mrs. Charles Rogers, Mrs. Hillis Ponder		
Jul 4	Monterey, California	Jul 1	Mrs. Louis Goldstein		#182
Jul 4	Wilmington, Delaware	Jul 1	Preston Lattomus		
Jul 4	Hot Springs, Arkansas	Jul 2			#156
Jul 4	Huntington Park, California	Jul 2	Elsie Brooks	Whizzing noise,	#157
Jul 4	Huntington Park, California	Jul 2	Elsie Brooks		#167
Jul 4	Pasadena, California	Jul 2	Frank Newcomb		#169
Jul 4	Texarkana, Texas	Jul 2	W O Robertson		#170
Jul 4	Klamath Falls, Oregon	Jul 2			#171
Jul 4	Burbank, California	Jul 2	William H Sullivan		#173
Jul 4	Tuyunga, California	Jul 2	C T Grove		#174
Jul 4	Montrose, California	Jul 2			#175
Jul 4	Texarkana, Texas	Jul 3	Wendell L. Carson, Mrs. S.G. Nichols		#163
Jul 4	Alturas, California	Jul 3	Charles Lederer, Dale Williams	Modic County DA,	#176
Jul 4	Omaha, California	Jul 3	Mrs. Fred C. Nelson		#179
Jul 4	Texarkana, Arkansas	Jul 3			#180
Jul 4	Nampa, Idaho	Jul 3	Charles Hughes, Clarence Faust		#188
Jul 4	Charlestown, Prince Edward Island	Jul 3	Ewen McNeill		#189
Jul 4	Sherbrooke, Prince Edward Island	Jul 3	James Harri		#190
Jul 4	Sherbrooke, Prince Edward Island	Jul 3	Brenton Clark		#191
Jul 4	Mountain Home, Arkansas	Jul 4	Unpublished		
Jul 4	San Diego, California	Jul 4	Robert L. Jackson, William Baker	Navy petty officers	
Jul 5	Beaufort, South Carolina	May 25	Colden R. Bettey	'About four week before first published reports of the discs'	
Jul 5	Ohiowa, Nebraska	Jun 23	L. Kaderbek		
Jul 5	Richland, Washington	Jun 24	L.G. Bernier		#37
Jul 5	Appleton, Colorado	Jun 28	H.E. Soule		#93
Jul 5	Denver, Colorado	Jul 2	Harry Martin, Walter Harrod		#166
Jul 5	England, Arkansas	Jul 3	J L Hampton		#193
Jul 5	San Diego, California	Jul 3	Robert Jackson		#194
Jul 5	Springfield, Illinois	Jul 3	George Mayfield		#202
Jul 5	Decatur, Illinois	Jul 3	Claude Price		#205
Jul 5	Decatur, Illinois	Jul 3	Claude Prince		
Jul 5	Pine Bluff, Arkansas	Jul 4	T.H. Huckaby	Directly over the Pine Bluff Arsenal,	#209
Jul 5	East Orange, New Jersey	Jul 4	Lenora Woodruff		#214
Jul 5	Alexandria, Virginia	Jul 4	Mrs Martin Kole		#216
Jul 5	New Orleans, Louisiana	Jul 4	Lillian Lawless		#223
Jul 5	Little Rock, Arkansas	Jul 4	A J Parsel		#225
Jul 5	Bakersfield, California	Jul 4	Norman Culver		#226
Jul 5	Troutdale, Oregon	Jul 4	Thos Berry & wife		#227
Jul 5	Portland, Oregon	Jul 4	Numerous		#229
Jul 5	Portland, Oregon	Jul 4	Don Metcalfe		#230
Jul 5	Vancouver, Washington	Jul 4	Fred Krives, John Sullivan, Clarence McKay		#232
Jul 5	Portland, Oregon	Jul 4	Kenneth A McDowell		#234
Jul 5	Portland, Oregon	Jul 4	Kenneth A McDowell		#235
Jul 5	Milwaukie, Oregon	Jul 4	Dick Haller, Claude Cross	Law enforcement	#236
Jul 5	Twin Falls, Idaho	Jul 4	60 picnickers	35 discs, "shape changing",	#237, #238, #243
Jul 5	Twin Falls Park, Idaho	Jul 4	A E Mitchell		#238
Jul 5	Twin Falls Park, Idaho	Jul 4	A E Mitchell		#243
Jul 5	Portland, Oregon	Jul 4	M A Denton		#244
Jul 5	Bow Lake, Washington	Jul 4	J H Oakley		#252
Jul 5	Seattle, Washington	Jul 4	Frank Ryman	Photographed,	#257
Jul 5	Boise, Idaho	Jul 4	John Corlett, V.H. Selby	United Press correspondent	#258
Jul 5	Akron, Ohio	Jul 4	Forrest Shaver, Harry E. Hoertz		#259
Jul 5	Salem, Oregon	Jul 4	G.R. Graen		#260
Jul 5	Salt Lake City, Utah	Jul 4	Mary Powers, Genevieve Dangerfield		#261
Jul 5	St. John, Nebraska	Jul 4	Paul Falkjar		#264
Jul 5	Hauser Lake, Idaho	Jul 4	"Over 200 people"		#271
Jul 5	Port Huron, Michigan	Jul 4	John R. Warner, Jessie Lewthwaite		#276
Jul 5	Malibu Beach, California	Jul 4	Frank E Chester		#284
Jul 5	Boise, Idaho	Jul 4	Emil J. Smith, Ralph Stephens of Flight 105		#285-6
Jul 5	Malibu Beach, California	Jul 4	Frank E Chester		#286
Jul 5	Little Rock, Arkansas	Jul 4	J Vance Clayton	Arkansas State Treasurer	#293
Jul 5	Alhambra, California	Jul 4	Stephen Kokay		#296
Jul 5	New Orleans, Louisiana	Jul 4	Lillian Laluiers		
Jul 5	Philadelphia, Pennsylvania	Jul 4	M.K. Keisy		
Jul 5	South Plainfield, New Jersey	Jul 4	Florence McIntire		
Jul 5	Ottawa, Ontario	Jul 4	Mrs. J.H. Dubinsky		
Jul 5	Hayden Lake, Idaho	Jul 4	"About 200 people"		
Jul 5	Eugene, Oregon	Jul 4	E.F. Smith	Discs being dropped from a plane	
Jul 5	Delaware, Ohio	Jul 4	Carl Thompson, R.S. Eddy	#266	
Jul 5	Portland, Oregon	Jul 4	"Hundreds of persons"	20 discs, Grudge #5-16	
Jul 5	Chillicothe, Ohio	Jul 4	Sherman Campbell	Balloon and tin foil	
Jul 5	Philadelphia, Pennsylvania	Jul 5	M.K. Leisy		#249
Jul 5	Hollywood, California	Jul 5	E.L. Freeman		#316
Jul 5	Spokane, Washington	Jul 5	Richard Gregg		#317, #318
Jul 5	Baltimore, Maryland	Jul 5	Kathleen Norris		#318
Jul 6	Tampa, Florida	Mar 20	J.E. Harp		
Jul 6	Shreveport, Louisiana	Jun 2	Carle Achee, John Soales	around Jun 2	#5
Jul 6	Great Falls, Montana	Jun 5	Marvin McDonald	About a month ago	
Jul 6	Miami, Florida	Jun 15	Jack Gurley	Three weeks ago	#562
Jul 6	Beauford, South Carolina	Jun 15	Colden R. Battey	Three weeks ago	
Jul 6	Chicago, Illinois	Jun 25	Mrs. Nels Thor		#51
Jul 6	Chicago, Illinois	Jun 26	Mrs J M Harrison		#64
Jul 6	Waterloo, Iowa	Jun 27	Charles Johnson, J.W. Marcum, J.E. Johnson	Stunned me. Not from the sight of it but almost as if from some ray that it gave out. Blame abombs exploded above and below water in Pacific	
Jul 6	Detroit, Michigan	Jun 28	Robert Ward		#90
Jul 6	Detroit, Michigan	Jun 28	Mrs Ingeborg Miles		#91
Jul 6	Rogers, Arkansas	Jun 30	J.P. Crumpler		#128
Jul 6	Indianapolis, Indiana	Jul 1	Kim McKinsey, Larry Johnson		#132
Jul 6	Detroit, Michigan	Jul 1	Rose Holson		#140
Jul 6	Charleston, South Carolina	Jul 1	Mrs J Fred Bischoff		#147
Jul 6	Roxbury, Massachusetts	Jul 1	Mrs. Edward P. Williams		#148
Jul 6	Springfield, Ohio	Jul 2	Donald Polen, Raymond Wilson, Ms. Barry Perazzo		#154
Jul 6	Huntington Park, California	Jul 2	Elsie Brooks		#168
Jul 6	Corona, California	Jul 3	S Basquez		#177
Jul 6	Denver, Colorado	Jul 3	A.L. Cochran		#178
Jul 6	Denver, Colorado	Jul 3	William F. Lefevre		#183
Jul 6	Washington NE, Dist of Columbia	Jul 3			#198
Jul 6	Seattle, Washington	Jul 3	Mrs Gordon Lynn		#208
Jul 6	Minneapolis, Minnesota	Jul 3	Evelyn Tupper, Inez Esberg		
Jul 6	Walkertown, Indiana	Jul 4	Mrs. Eugene Dixon, Mrs. Ray Dixon		#192
Jul 6	Orange, New Jersey	Jul 4	Carol Bryla		#212
Jul 6	Alexandria, Virginia	Jul 4	Mrs Martin Kole		#215
Jul 6	Astoria, Oregon	Jul 4	Irving C. Allen		#217
Jul 6	Clifton, Colorado	Jul 4	Cora Burks		#218
Jul 6	Borger, Texas	Jul 4	G.F. Maddox		#219
Jul 6	San Pedro, California	Jul 4	Edward Mutchler		#221
Jul 6	Redondo Beach, California	Jul 4	Capt T W Peters		#222
Jul 6	Sylvan Beach to La Porte, Texas	Jul 4	Mrs. W.F. Parchman		#224
Jul 6	Portland, Oregon	Jul 4	Frank Cooley		#228
Jul 6	Portland, Oregon	Jul 4	Carl Prehn (K A Preh), A.T. Austad,K.C.Hoff		#233
Jul 6	Great Falls, Montana	Jul 4	Curt Dennis		#240
Jul 6	Arcadia, California	Jul 4	Verna Edwards		#246
Jul 6	Arcadia, California	Jul 4	C P Quickel.		#247
Jul 6	Colorado Springs, Colorado	Jul 4			#250
Jul 6	Santa Monica, California	Jul 4	Dan J. Whelan,Duncan Underhill	Vanished in the direction of Catalina Island,	#254
Jul 6	Elliott, North Dakota	Jul 4	Vigil Been		#256
Jul 6	Kansas City, Kansas	Jul 4	Arthur Gustafson, Mrs. Adolph Eklund, Miss Joseph Kaminsky		#262
Jul 6	Columbus, Ohio	Jul 4	William Pfeiffer		#267
Jul 6	Columbus, Ohio	Jul 4	Florence Hilliard		#268
Jul 6	St. Louis, Missouri	Jul 4	Nelson Vickrey		#269
Jul 6	Elmira, Missouri	Jul 4	Mrs W T Bisbee		#270
Jul 6	Casper, Wyoming	Jul 4	Margaret McLeod		#272
Jul 6	Texarkana, Arkansas (Texas)	Jul 4	Charley Pappas		#273
Jul 6	Detroit, Michigan	Jul 4	Edward V Jeffers		#275
Jul 6	Texarkana, Arkansas (Texas)	Jul 4	Betty Stone		#278
Jul 6	Los Angeles, California	Jul 4	Herman V Friede		#287
Jul 6	Denver, Colorado	Jul 4	L A Walgren		#290
Jul 6	Denver, Colorado	Jul 4	Mrs John N Perrin		#294
Jul 6	Los Angeles, California	Jul 4	Eva Etten		#295
Jul 6	Augusta, Maine	Jul 4	Dan Kelly		#315
Jul 6	Chester, Indiana	Jul 4	Ralph Kramer, J.E. Clark		#365
Jul 6	Dallas, Texas	Jul 4	Mrs. Clifford Ford		
Jul 6	Ada, Tennessee	Jul 4	Deputy George Denny		
Jul 6	Keokuk, Iowa	Jul 5	S.M. Bayloer, S.M. Barker, William Boehl, C.F. Bowles		#186
Jul 6	St. Louis, Missouri	Jul 5	Nova Hart		#242
Jul 6	Salt Lake City, Utah	Jul 5	Mrs. Wayne Welsh, Marilyn Mammal		#251
Jul 6	Evansville, Indiana	Jul 5	Frank Hoffman, Mary Louise Bumbledare		#298
Jul 6	Huntington, Indiana	Jul 5	Kenneth Johnson		#299
Jul 6	Salt Lake City, Utah	Jul 5	Lucy Osborne		#300
Jul 6	Waterbury, Connecticut	Jul 5	Three residents in		#301
Jul 6	Waterloo, Iowa	Jul 5	J.E. Johnston		#304
Jul 6	San Pedro, California	Jul 5	Clifton A. Hix	vanished in the direction of Catalina Island	#305
Jul 6	Bethesda, Maryland	Jul 5	Jack LaBous (IaBous)	Drawing made	#306
Jul 6	Baltimore, Maryland	Jul 5	Kathleen Norris		#307
Jul 6	Dana Point, California	Jul 5	John R. Street (John K. Street)		#309
Jul 6	Baltimore, Maryland	Jul 5	Kathleen Norris		#310
Jul 6	Glendale, California	Jul 5	Donald Dwiggins	Changing shape as they flew	#311
Jul 6	Baltimore, Maryland	Jul 5	Kathleen Norris		#312
Jul 6	Baltimore, Maryland	Jul 5	Kathleen Norris		#313
Jul 6	Baltimore, Maryland	Jul 5	Kathleen Norris		#319
Jul 6	Mountain View, California	Jul 5	Charles S. Sigala		#320
Jul 6	Shreveport, Louisiana	Jul 5	Henry Herbert		#321
Jul 6	Baltimore, Maryland	Jul 5	Kathleen Norris		#323
Jul 6	Baltimore, Maryland	Jul 5	Kathleen Norris		#325
Jul 6	Baltimore, Maryland	Jul 5	Kathleen Norris		#326
Jul 6	Baltimore, Maryland	Jul 5	Kathleen Norris		#327
Jul 6	Baltimore, Maryland	Jul 5	Kathleen Norris		#329
Jul 6	Albuquerque, New Mexico	Jul 5	John Goyng, Charles Roat, Fred Lucero, Lorenzo Garcia, Jess Satathite		#331
Jul 6	Baltimore, Maryland	Jul 5	Kathleen Norris		#333
Jul 6	Boise, Idaho	Jul 5	Henry Vanderhoef, Richard Shirley, Don Baker		#335
Jul 6	Baltimore, Maryland	Jul 5	Kathleen Norris		#336
Jul 6	Charleston, South Carolina	Jul 5	S.A. Cothran		#337
Jul 6	Neapolis, Ohio	Jul 5	J.L. Dobberteen, Frank Corwin	Pilots	#340
Jul 6	Seattle, Washington	Jul 5	John Meisenbach		#343
Jul 6	Omaha, Nebraska	Jul 5	Katherine Bauer		#346
Jul 6	Zanesville, Ohio	Jul 5	Barry Peruzzo		#347
Jul 6	Zanesville, Ohio	Jul 5	Barry Peruzzo		#353
Jul 6	Philadelphia, Pennsylvania	Jul 5	Martin Forman, Paul Moss		#355
Jul 6	Butte, Montana	Jul 5	Shirley Heffern, Lois Mae Gadbaw		#362
Jul 6	Indianapolis, Indiana	Jul 5	Harry Mossbaugh, Dick Stutesman		#364
Jul 6	Walkertown, Indiana	Jul 5	Harry Mosbaugh, Dick Stutesman		#364
Jul 6	Salt Lake City, Utah	Jul 5	Marilyn Hamal		#367
Jul 6	Olsen City, Idaho	Jul 5	Don Baker & wife		#371
Jul 6	Olsen City, Idaho	Jul 5	Don Baker		#372
Jul 6	Pocatello, Idaho	Jul 5	Jack Smith, RA Seymor		
Jul 6	Great Falls, Montana	Jul 5	Ace Erickson, Art Smith, Kenneth Smith		
Jul 6	Butte, Montana	Jul 5	Shirley Hefferon, Lois May Gadbaw		
Jul 6	Pittsburgh, Pennsylvania	Jul 5	Mary G. Gray, Mrs. J. R. Hickson		
Jul 6	Corpus Christi, Texas	Jul 5	Georgia Penny, Ada Roberts		
Jul 6	Texarkana, Texas	Jul 5	Henry Pruitt		
Jul 6	Marshall, Texas	Jul 5	W. T. Bryan		
Jul 6	Clifton, Colorado	Jul 5	Dan Roberts		
Jul 6	Flint, Michigan	Jul 6	Homer Thompson		#381
Jul 6	Tucson, Arizona	Jul 7	Niles Casteel (Mike Casteel)		#396
Jul 6	Tucson, Arizona	Jul 7	W.D. Magness		#397
Jul 6	Waskom, Texas	Dec 4	J.F. Hawkins		
Jul 7	Kingsport, Tennessee	1945	Charlie T. Hamlet	two years ago, near Oak Ridge	
Jul 7	Bakersfield, California	Jun 1	Mrs C W Parks		#3
Jul 7	Madison, Wisconsin	Jun 17	E B McGilvery		#12
Jul 7	Cedar Rapids, Iowa	Jun 19	R.D. Taylor		#15
Jul 7	Spokane, Washington	Jun 22	Walter Laos		#21
Jul 7	Cincinnati, Ohio	Jun 23	Thomas Nelson		#28
Jul 7	Hazel Green, Alabama	Jun 23	E.B. Parks		#29
Jul 7	Poplar Grove, Pennsylvania	Jun 25	Mrs. G.E. Hart		#50
Jul 7	Pueblo, Colorado	Jun 25	Lloyd M Lowry		#53
Jul 7	Glens Falls, New York	Jun 25	Louis Stebbins, J C Caffrey		#59
Jul 7	Walter, Oklahoma	Jun 25	C.E. Holman		#61
Jul 7	Kermit, Texas	Jun 27	M.E. (Jack) Spry, Norris Nelson		
Jul 7	Spokane, Washington	Jun 29	Walter Laos		#108
Jul 7	Sioux City, Iowa	Jun 29	Mrs. H.F. Angus		#113
Jul 7	Falmouth, Massachusetts	Jun 30	Edward H Murphy		#122
Jul 7	Knoxville, Tennessee	Jun 30			#124
Jul 7	Norwood, Ohio	Jun 30	Mrs H W Stockwell		#126
Jul 7	Pocatello, Idaho	Jul 1	Robert James		#130
Jul 7	Chandler, Arizona	Jul 1	Robert E. Johnson		#131
Jul 7	Wallaceburg, Ontario	Jul 1	Ray Stevens		#141
Jul 7	Sioux City, Iowa	Jul 1	E.B. Morrison		#164
Jul 7	Green Bay, Wisconsin	Jul 2	Eugene LePlant (LaPlant)		#160
Jul 7	Cincinnati, Ohio	Jul 2	Mike Zavisin		#161
Jul 7	Sioux City, Iowa	Jul 2	J.W. Smith		#165
Jul 7	Cincinnati, Ohio	Jul 2	Mike Zavisin, Jim Chaney		
Jul 7	Staten Island, New York	Jul 3	Nicholas Kronyak		#185
Jul 7	Baltimore, Maryland	Jul 3	Gertrude Landry		#199
Jul 7	Ashdown, Arkansas	Jul 4	J L Stinson		#210
Jul 7	Essex Falls, New Jersey	Jul 4	Mrs. Harold Doner		#213
Jul 7	Pocatello, Idaho	Jul 4	Henry Seymour		#241
Jul 7	Lake Jackson, Texas	Jul 4	Louise Jacobs		#245
Jul 7	Elliott, North Dakota	Jul 4	Vigil Been		#255
Jul 7	Fayetteville, Arkansas	Jul 4	Henry Seay		#263
Jul 7	Ottawa, Ontario	Jul 4	Larry Laviolette, V.A. Bond		#265
Jul 7	West Trenton, New Jersey	Jul 4	Marion Marshall		#280
Jul 7	Dolton, Illinois	Jul 4	Andrew Wolfe		#281
Jul 7	Sioux Falls, South Dakota	Jul 4	Ronald C Jordon		#283
Jul 7	Los Angeles, California	Jul 4	Herman V Friede		#288
Jul 7	Edgarton, Wisconsin	Jul 4	Mrs. Melvin Voigt		#289
Jul 7	Shreveport, Louisiana	Jul 4	G E Baird		#292
Jul 7	Lowell, Michigan	Jul 5	Grand Rapids woman		#302
Jul 7	Baltimore, Maryland	Jul 5	Kathleen Norris		#303
Jul 7	Sacramento, California	Jul 5	A.K. Carr		#308
Jul 7	Cincinnati, Ohio	Jul 5	Elizabeth Taylor, Cora Strickland		#314
Jul 7	Baltimore, Maryland	Jul 5	Kathleen Norris		#322
Jul 7	Camden, New Jersey	Jul 5	Ellen Desrocher		#324
Jul 7	Alameda, California	Jul 5	Kjell Qvale, John Flint		#332
Jul 7	Albany, Oregon	Jul 5	Ted Tannich, William Lemon		#338
Jul 7	Allegan, Michigan	Jul 5	Dan Conroy		#341
Jul 7	Dell Rapids, South Dakota	Jul 5	Anna Dahl, Amy Rutherford		#342
Jul 7	Seattle, Washington	Jul 5	John Meisenbach		#344
Jul 7	Palo Alto, California	Jul 5	Augustin Fernandez		#345
Jul 7	Fayetteville, Alaska	Jul 5	Henry Seay		#350
Jul 7	Dallas, Texas	Jul 5	J A Reeder		#351
Jul 7	Wallaceburg, Ontario	Jul 5	Scores of witnesses		#354
Jul 7	Baltimore, Maryland	Jul 5	Dorothy Arnold		#356
Jul 7	Detroit, Michigan	Jul 5	Approximately 500		#357
Jul 7	Pond Lake, Michigan	Jul 5	Willard Fisk		#358
Jul 7	Oakland, California	Jul 5	Mrs Donald Nelson		#360
Jul 7	Aberdeen, Idaho	Jul 5	Jack Smith		#361
Jul 7	Cheyenne, W'oming	Jul 5	Prominent Cheyenne		#366
Jul 7	Salt Lake City, Utah	Jul 5	Marilyn Hamal		#368
Jul 7	Columbus, Ohio	Jul 5	Edward Blackwell		#369
Jul 7	Lockbourne, Ohio	Jul 5	Mrs George Taylor		#370
Jul 7	Janesville, Wisconsin	Jul 5	Al Sievert, Howard Roth,		#373
Jul 7	Towanda, Pennsylvania	Jul 5	Mrs. A.C. Smith		#501
Jul 7	San Mateo, California	Jul 5	Marie Maranta		#595
Jul 7	Sioux Falls, South Dakota	Jul 5	Ronald L. Jordan		
Jul 7	Susquehanna County, Pennsylvania	Jul 5	Park M. Horton		
Jul 7	Scranton, Pennsylvania	Jul 5	Eleanor Connor, Frank Fenstermacher		
Jul 7	Madison, Wisconsin	Jul 6	Ted Boyle, Mrs. John Boyl, Ruth Donhard		#197
Jul 7	St. Maries, Idaho	Jul 6	Mrs. Walter Johnson	saw objects fall,	#200
Jul 7	Salt Lake City, Utah	Jul 6	Oliver G. Ellis, Richard Ellis, Kyle Sessions	2 discs fell,	#291
Jul 7	Oakland, California	Jul 6	Marilyn Nelson (Mrs. Donald Nelson)		#359
Jul 7	Lake Tahoe, California	Jul 6	Jay Hall		#374
Jul 7	Economy, Nova Scotia	Jul 6	Mabel Berry		#375
Jul 7	Milwaukee, Wisconsin	Jul 6	Frank Phifer		#376
Jul 7	Newark, New Jersey	Jul 6	Dorothy Kingcade		#378
Jul 7	Miami Springs, Florida	Jul 6	Fred Walsh		#382
Jul 7	Pocatello, Idaho	Jul 6	H.C. McLean	floated to ground, stopped a few seconds, took off again,	#383
Jul 7	Milwaukee, Wisconsin	Jul 6	John Bosch		#384
Jul 7	Newark, New Jersey	Jul 6	Helene Berard		#385
Jul 7	Acampo, California	Jul 6	Mrs. W.C. Smith	Noise "like a bomber" and loss of power	#386
Jul 7	New Orleans, Louisiana	Jul 6	Robert G Hellman		#387
Jul 7	Cody, Wyoming	Jul 6	Mrs. Frank Walters		#388
Jul 7	Ashland, Oregon	Jul 6	Dr S Everett		#389
Jul 7	Tampa, Florida	Jul 6	E.H.Kleiser		#390
Jul 7	Spokane, Washington	Jul 6	Mrs. C. C. Jenkins		#391
Jul 7	Spokane, Washington	Jul 6	Mrs C C Jenkins		#392
Jul 7	Tioga, Louisiana	Jul 6	Four persons		#393
Jul 7	Lake Lotawana, Missouri	Jul 6	David S Long Jr		#394
Jul 7	Pittsburg, California	Jul 6	Frank Tylman, Danny Tylman		#395
Jul 7	Kansas City, Kansas	Jul 6	Barbara Mehner		#399
Jul 7	Kansas City, Kansas	Jul 6	Barbara Mehner		#400
Jul 7	Chicago, Illinois	Jul 6			#401
Jul 7	Denver, Colorado	Jul 6	LeRoy Krieger		#403
Jul 7	Alcova, Wyoming	Jul 6	Dan Browder		#404
Jul 7	1 mi Glen Rock, Wyoming	Jul 6	Jim Drury		#405
Jul 7	Throckmorton, Texas	Jul 6	Luther Roberts		#407
Jul 7	Charleston, South Carolina	Jul 6	J G O'Brien		#408
Jul 7	Memphis, Tennessee	Jul 6	J A Conrow		#409
Jul 7	Memphis, Tennessee	Jul 6	H B Leatherwood		#410
Jul 7	Idaho Springs, Colorado	Jul 6	Pat Price		#411
Jul 7	Freeport, Illinois	Jul 6	Elmer H Schirmer		#412
Jul 7	Hagerstown, Maryland	Jul 6	Madelyn Ganoe		#413
Jul 7	Portland, Oregon	Jul 6			#414
Jul 7	Lake Lotawana, Missouri	Jul 6	W A Peterson		#415
Jul 7	Sioux City, Iowa	Jul 6	W.A. Verzani		#416
Jul 7	Lewiston, Idaho	Jul 6	Hundreds		#418
Jul 7	San Francisco, California	Jul 6	Amy Shearer		#419
Jul 7	San Francisco, California	Jul 6	Madeline Stoll		#420
Jul 7	Vacaville, California	Jul 6	James Meagher		#421
Jul 7	Vallejo, California	Jul 6	Pfc Robert O'Hara		#422
Jul 7	Fairfield, California	Jul 6	Capt Jms H Burniston		#424
Jul 7	Elizabeth, New Jersey	Jul 6	Frederick Schlauch		#425
Jul 7	Mill Valley, California	Jul 6	Charles W. Butler, William Butler		#426
Jul 7	Denver, Colorado	Jul 6	George Kuger	Disc with American Flag,	#427
Jul 7	Coeur d'Alene, Idaho	Jul 6	David Frost		#429
Jul 7	Casper, Wyoming	Jul 6	G W Gibson		#430
Jul 7	Tempe, Arizona	Jul 6	Francis Howell		#431
Jul 7	Tempe, Arizona	Jul 6	Francis Howell		#432
Jul 7	Seattle, Washington	Jul 6	Marie Quinn		#433
Jul 7	San Francisco, California	Jul 6	Peggy Sarasohn		#434
Jul 7	San Francisco, California	Jul 6	Albert Schlegel		#435
Jul 7	Wilton, California	Jul 6	Mrs K Spotts		#436
Jul 7	Santa Cruz, California	Jul 6	George Mayberry		#437
Jul 7	Portland, Oregon	Jul 6			#438
Jul 7	Portland, Oregon	Jul 6			#439
Jul 7	Portland, Oregon	Jul 6			#440
Jul 7	Greenwood, Missouri	Jul 6	Helen Chiddix		#441
Jul 7	Greenwood, Missouri	Jul 6	Helen Chiddix		#442
Jul 7	Charleston, South Carolina	Jul 6	Lew Brown		#443
Jul 7	Darlington, South Carolina	Jul 6	J.U.Watts	Army plane pursuing formation of saucers,	#444
Jul 7	Cincinnati, Ohio	Jul 6	Mrs. Arthur C. Stollmaier		#445
Jul 7	Londonderry, New Hampshire	Jul 6	Harold Healy		#446
Jul 7	Wenharn, Massachusetts	Jul 6	A H Pembroke		#447
Jul 7	Paterson, New Jersey	Jul 6	Harold Baker		#450
Jul 7	New Orleans, Louisiana	Jul 6	H Lee Brady & wife		#451
Jul 7	Sioux Falls, South Dakota	Jul 6	Gregory Zimmer	National guard plane dispatched,	#452
Jul 7	Tucson, Arizona	Jul 6	Joseph Hendron		#454
Jul 7	Milwaukee, Wisconsin	Jul 6	Erwin Rottman, John Bosch		#455
Jul 7	Portsmouth, Virginia	Jul 6	Mrs A H Whittaker		#457
Jul 7	Rochester, New York	Jul 6	Kenneth Ohley		#459
Jul 7	Washington, D.C.	Jul 6	Hazen Kennedy		#460
Jul 7	Ladue, Missouri	Jul 6	Warren Flynn		#467
Jul 7	St. Joseph, Missouri	Jul 6	C D Frank & family		#468
Jul 7	Portland, Oregon	Jul 6			#469
Jul 7	Gretna, Nebraska	Jul 6			#470
Jul 7	Houston, Texas	Jul 6	Mrs Bernard Shelansky		#471
Jul 7	Houston, Texas	Jul 6	Mrs Bernard Shelansky		#472
Jul 7	Mt. Vernon, Washington	Jul 6	Walter Amber & wife		#473
Jul 7	Mt Vernon, Washington	Jul 6	A Haarval		#474
Jul 7	Seattle, Washington	Jul 6	W. Bernard Toner		#475
Jul 7	Boise, Idaho	Jul 6	Lee Esting		#476
Jul 7	Edgewood, Texas	Jul 6	E C Sneed		#477
Jul 7	Rock Creek, Minnesota	Jul 6	Carl Dion840		#478
Jul 7	Walkerville, Ontario	Jul 6			#479
Jul 7	Walkerville, Ontario	Jul 6			#480
Jul 7	Brighton, Alabama	Jul 6	Connie Murdoch, H.E. Reagor,Mrs. James Bain, Dan Smirl, H.M.Sockwell, Gene Blumstead, J.A. Hafner, L.M. Cadenhead, J.R. Martin, Frank ARonlwd, William Howell, Frank. S. Lovelace, R.H. Vaughn, Jimmy Dewerry		#485, #488, #491, #492, #494
Jul 7	Birmingham, Alabama	Jul 6	Gene Plumstead, Robert B. Crossland		#490, #493
Jul 7	Birmingham, Alabama	Jul 6	J H Chatham		#495
Jul 7	Birmingham, Alabama	Jul 6	J H Chatham		#496
Jul 7	Birmingham, Alabama	Jul 6	Connie Murdock		#497
Jul 7	Birmingham, Alabama	Jul 6	Ira L Livingston		#498
Jul 7	Milwaukee, Wisconsin	Jul 6	William Humphrey		#499
Jul 7	Dallas, Texas	Jul 6	Joe Lovelace		#500
Jul 7	E Providence, Rhode Island	Jul 6	Mrs Herbert Fuller		#502
Jul 7	Stratford, Connecticut	Jul 6	Elmer Holloway & wife		#503
Jul 7	Stratford, Connecticut	Jul 6	Elmer Holloway & wife		#504
Jul 7	Seattle, Washington	Jul 6	Walter Amber & wife		#507
Jul 7	Woodlawn, Maryland	Jul 6	Arthur Baer		#508
Jul 7	Baltimore, Maryland	Jul 6	Larry Johnson		#509
Jul 7	Denver, Colorado	Jul 6	Mrs J E Raiber		#510
Jul 7	Indianapolis, Indiana	Jul 6	Jack Marshall		#511
Jul 7	Indianapolis, Indiana	Jul 6	Jack Marshall		#512
Jul 7	Brighton, Alabama	Jul 6	Mrs. Gordon Mize		#513
Jul 7	Covington, Kentucky	Jul 6	William Rolfes		#515
Jul 7	Milwaukie, Wisconsin	Jul 6	Glen Rowden		#517
Jul 7	Denver, Colorado	Jul 6	Harold Wallace		#518
Jul 7	Chicago, Illinois	Jul 6	George Wilkinson		#519
Jul 7	Chicago, Illinois	Jul 6	George Wilkinson		#520
Jul 7	Chicago, Illinois	Jul 6	More than 10 residents		#521
Jul 7	Denver, Colorado	Jul 6	Stephen Witkin		#522
Jul 7	Denver, Colorado	Jul 6	Howard Stahlheber		#523
Jul 7	East Los Angeles, California	Jul 6	Joseph Harris		#524
Jul 7	Omaha, Nebraska	Jul 6	Anon resident of		#525
Jul 7	Minneapolis, Minnesota	Jul 6	Mrs Clarence Lasseson		#526
Jul 7	Palmdale, California	Jul 6	Amy Herdliska		#530
Jul 7	Rockford, Wisconsin	Jul 6	Wilbur Luckey		#559
Jul 7	Oroville, California	Jul 6	Harold Gross (Grass)		#697
Jul 7	Oroville, California	Jul 6	Robert Larkinn		#697a
Jul 7	Oroville, California	Jul 6	A.L.Watson		#697b
Jul 7	Oroville, California	Jul 6	D.D. Wright		#697c
Jul 7	San Leandro, California	Jul 6	Dominic Chekalovich, Mrs. Harry Reisz, Lillian J. Stong		
Jul 7	Alameda, California	Jul 6	Mrs. R.M. Wagner		
Jul 7	Berkeley, California	Jul 6	John Shirley, George Shirley, Rinaldo and Myrtle Risi,Marilyn Neson		
Jul 7	Amarillo, Texas	Jul 6	C.D Hoover, S.O. Hutchins, George Mouerner, Bill Louden		
Jul 7	Tobacco Root Mountains, Montana	Jul 6	Vernon Baird, George Sutton	Admitted to be hoax the same day	
Jul 7	Grafton, Wisconsin	Jul 6	Joseph Brasky	Discovered object, later revealed to be saw blade with tubes and wires	
Jul 7	East St. Louis, Illinois	Jul 6	J.T. Harley	Discovered object, later revealed to be packing washers	
Jul 7	Lewiston, Idaho	Jul 6	Louis Krezak	Weatherman reports objects likely weed seeds	
Jul 7	Memphis, Tennessee	Jul 6	Robert Summers		
Jul 7	Lincoln, Nebraska	Jul 6	J.F. Hogan, John Goldfein		
Jul 7	Logansport, Indiana	Jul 6	Robert Miller		
Jul 7	Freeport, Wisconsin	Jul 6	Elmer H. Schirman		
Jul 7	Columbia, South Carolina	Jul 6	James Rabon, Harold Birch		
Jul 7	Kermit, Texas	Jul 6	C.D. Hoover, C.O. Hutchins, George Meuerner, Bill Louden		
Jul 7	Ontario, Oregon	Jul 6	R.J. Kneidl		
Jul 7	Lubbock, Texas	Jul 6	Jim Purdy, Mattie McBroom, L.B. Cooper		
Jul 7	Binghamton, New York	Jul 6	Margaret Bracey, Gordon Smith, Leslie Graham		
Jul 7	Long Beach, California	Jul 6	Mrs. C.G. Pommer, Mrs. A.L. Lape	Reportedly filmed by motion picture camera	
Jul 7	Altoona, Pennsylvania	Jul 6	Mrs. Dan Spinazzoli		
Jul 7	Bucyrus, Ohio	Jul 6	Daniel Grogg, Leslie Swartz	Carnival searchlights	
Jul 7	St. Louis, Missouri	Jul 6	T.J. Hatley, Mrs. George W. Wilson, Charles Downs, MRs. N.P. McDonald, George Malcom, Mrs. J.W.Brondos, Alton, Mrs. William Gent, Thomas Rose		
Jul 7	Spokane, Washington	Jul 7	Walter Laos		#453
Jul 7	Dayton, Ohio	Jul 7	Ed Miller, Carl Stewart		#534
Jul 7	Baltimore, Maryland	Jul 7	Melvin Kearney		#548
Jul 7	Chicago, Illinois	Jul 7	Charles Allen		#549
Jul 7	Cambridge, Massachusetts	Jul 7			#551
Jul 7	Columbia, Missouri	Jul 7	Ray Taylor		#554
Jul 7	North Buffalo, New York	Jul 7			#555
Jul 7	North Buffalo, New York	Jul 7			#556
Jul 7	Cheyenne, Wyoming	Jul 7			#557
Jul 7	Denver, Colorado	Jul 7			#561
Jul 7	Gretna, Nebraska	Jul 7			#565
Jul 7	Indianapolis, Indiana	Jul 7			#570
Jul 7	Pocatello, Idaho	Jul 7	Six persons		#572
Jul 7	Willow Springs, Illinois	Jul 7	Robert Meegan		#573
Jul 7	Brandenburg, Kentucky	Jul 7	E L Ornstein		#576
Jul 7	Verdi, Nevada	Jul 7	Harry Rose George		#577
Jul 7	Verdi, Nevada	Jul 7	Harry Rose George		#578
Jul 7	Lynn, Massachusetts	Jul 7			#579
Jul 7	Dorchester, Massachusetts	Jul 7	John Stewart		#580
Jul 7	Spokane, Washington	Jul 7	Mrs Fred Reehl		#585
Jul 7	Seattle, Washington	Jul 7	Jack Kobelt		#604
Jul 7	Memphis, Tennessee	May	Mrs. William C. Clark	Early in May	
Jul 8	Healy, Alaska	May 27	Mrs. George Gale	Six weeks ago	
Jul 8	Grand Rapids, Michigan	Jun 1	Inez Nostrant		#4
Jul 8	Houston, Texas	Jun 10	W.E. Butler		
Jul 8	Gering, Nebraska	Jun 15	Mrs. Henry Ackley		#9
Jul 8	Tipton, Indiana	Jun 18	Mrs. Harry Graham	Three weeks ago tomorrow	
Jul 8	Wapokoneta, Ohio	Jun 23	Richard L. Bitters		#27
Jul 8	Diamond Fork, Utah	Jun 26	Roy Freshwater		#63
Jul 8	Hooksett, New Hampshire	Jun 28	Mrs Henry Price		#98
Jul 8	White Sands, New Mexico	Jun 29	C.J. Zohn	Rocket expert, Grudge #90,	#109
Jul 8	St. Joseph, Missouri	Jun 29	Mrs. E.D. Butts		
Jul 8	Knoxville, Tennessee	Jun 30	C.E. Brehm	Univ. of Tennessee president,	#125
Jul 8	Knoxville, Tennessee	Jun 30	C.E. Bellam		#127
Jul 8	Arkadelphia, Arkansas	Jul 1			#129
Jul 8	Morrisonville, Wisconsin	Jul 1			#142
Jul 8	Wilmington, North Carolina	Jul 1	C.J. Dantagnam		#143
Jul 8	Cincinnati, Ohio	Jul 1	Audrey Holbrook, Carol Berman		#149
Jul 8	Alexandria, Louisiana	Jul 2	Carrie Smith		
Jul 8	Lockland, Ohio	Jul 3			#181
Jul 8	Greenhills, Ohio	Jul 3			#195
Jul 8	Warren, Pennsylvania	Jul 3	Richard Betts, Kenneth Lundahl, William Houston, Phillip Johnson		#203
Jul 8	Sioux City, Iowa	Jul 3	Jacob Kriv (Priv), Harold Kriv, Darlene Kriv		#206
Jul 8	Seattle, Washington	Jul 3	Mrs Gordon Lynn		#207
Jul 8	Morristown, Tennessee	Jul 3	W.A. Walker		
Jul 8	Tipton, Indiana	Jul 3	Louis W. Curtis		
Jul 8	Seattle, Washington	Jul 4	Charles Kamp		#253
Jul 8	Madison, Wisconsin	Jul 4	Wm Ecker		#277
Jul 8	St. Paul, Minnesota	Jul 4	Laura Behrens		#282
Jul 8	Atlanta, Texas	Jul 4	A.D. Cannon		
Jul 8	Freeland, Michigan	Jul 4	Helen Minch		
Jul 8	Walnut Grove, California	Jul 5			#297
Jul 8	Baltimore, Maryland	Jul 5	Kathleen Norris		#334
Jul 8	Knoxville, Tennessee	Jul 5	Bill Anderson		#338
Jul 8	Knoxville, Tennessee	Jul 5	Bill Anderson		#339
Jul 8	Meeker, Oklahoma	Jul 5	Bert Hall & wife		#348
Jul 8	Seattle, Washington	Jul 5	Mrs H B Fry		#363
Jul 8	Crawfordsville, Indiana	Jul 6	Kenneth Stanford		#204
Jul 8	Reno, Nevada	Jul 6			#380
Jul 8	Pasco, Washington	Jul 6	Bill Isaacson		#398
Jul 8	Meridian, Mississippi	Jul 6	Marty Fleming		#417
Jul 8	Wenharn, Massachusetts	Jul 6	A H Pembroke		#448
Jul 8	Norman, Oklahoma	Jul 6	W.H. Carson		#456
Jul 8	Anandarko, Oklahoma	Jul 6	Five residents		#458
Jul 8	Ladue, Missouri	Jul 6	Dr Walter Hoefer		#461
Jul 8	Shrewsbury, Missouri	Jul 6	G W Willson & family		#462
Jul 8	St. Louis, Missouri	Jul 6	Mrs N P McDonald		#463
Jul 8	St. Louis, Missouri	Jul 6	Mrs N P McDonald		#464
Jul 8	St. Louis, Missouri	Jul 6	Pauline Klasky		#465
Jul 8	Ferguson, Missouri	Jul 6	Wm A Good		#466
Jul 8	Birmingham, Alabama	Jul 6	H E Reager		#482
Jul 8	Birmingham, Alabama	Jul 6	Jimmy Dewberry		#483
Jul 8	Birmingham, Alabama	Jul 6	Mrs James Rain		#484
Jul 8	Birmingham, Alabama	Jul 6	Mrs Alfred Hackbarth		#486
Jul 8	Birmingham, Alabama	Jul 6	William Howell.		#487
Jul 8	Birmingham, Alabama	Jul 6	William Howell.		#488
Jul 8	Fairfield Highlands, Alabama	Jul 6	Anonymous witness		#489
Jul 8	Ensley Highlands, Alabama	Jul 6	R H Vaughn III		#491
Jul 8	Ensley, Alabama	Jul 6	J A Hafner		#492
Jul 8	Birmingham, Alabama	Jul 6	Robert Crossland		#493
Jul 8	Birmingham, Alabama	Jul 6	Dan Smirl		#494
Jul 8	Fremont, Ohio	Jul 6	Edward Jenck		#505
Jul 8	San Rafael, California	Jul 6	Arthur H Fellows		#506
Jul 8	Darlington, South Carolina	Jul 6	Mrs James Howle		#514
Jul 8	SBurlington, Wisconsin	Jul 6	Gordon Nielson		#516
Jul 8	Beverly Hills, California	Jul 6	Diane Thompson		#527
Jul 8	North Hollywood, California	Jul 6	Mrs. William A. Becker		#529
Jul 8	West Springfield, Massachusetts	Jul 6	Mrs. Rosina Randall & son		#532
Jul 8	South Bend, Indiana	Jul 6	Joseph J. Kuritz		#536
Jul 8	Pittsburg, California	Jul 6	Mrs Edward Buckhaber		#542
Jul 8	Anandarko, Oklahoma	Jul 6	Five persons		#646
Jul 8	Bethlehem, Pennsylvania	Jul 6	Edna Lynn, Harvey Gould, Joseph Fenol, Joseph Tallarico		
Jul 8	Verdugo Hills, California	Jul 6	Albert Neighbors		
Jul 8	Harbor City, California	Jul 6	Dorothy Place, Ramona Staube, Ray Coffield		
Jul 8	Auburn, Alabama	Jul 6	Jim Bradley		
Jul 8	St. Louis,Missouri	Jul 7	Mrs. H.J. Beckemeyer (Beckmeyer), E.W. Brown		#106
Jul 8	Wilmington, North Carolina	Jul 7	Mrs. W.H. Pemberton		#144
Jul 8	Carolina Beach, North Carolina	Jul 7	Elmo Fountain		#145
Jul 8	Asheville, North Carolina	Jul 7	Mrs J.D. Norwood, John D. Norwood Jr, Kate Medlock, Martha Medlock		#196
Jul 8	Hillsboro, Texas	Jul 7	Bob Scott, W.C. Kissick, Joe Gerrick, Ben Shults		#211
Jul 8	Hillsboro, Texas	Jul 7	Dan S. Shots, Bob Scott	Disc remnant described as "spidery and dusty", dissolved on handling,	#211
Jul 8	Anniston, Alabama	Jul 7	Fain Cole, Joyce Backus, Eula Anderson, Estoria Phillips		#377
Jul 8	Houston, Texas	Jul 7	Sadie McCauley		#379
Jul 8	Kankakee, Illinois	Jul 7	Jesse L. Hendrickson, Frank Abrogast		#481
Jul 8	Athol, Massachusetts	Jul 7	Four residents		#531
Jul 8	New Haven, Connecticut	Jul 7	John Maffey		#533
Jul 8	Bourbon County, Kentucky	Jul 7	Joe Bell & wife		#535
Jul 8	Peoria, Illinois	Jul 7	Harry L Spooner		#537
Jul 8	Chicago, Illinois	Jul 7	Tony Janiro		#538
Jul 8	Chicago, Illinois	Jul 7	George Jones		#540
Jul 8	Chicago, Illinois	Jul 7	Joe Shaughnessy		#541
Jul 8	Riverside, California	Jul 7	R V Allen		#543
Jul 8	Ontario, California	Jul 7	B.A. Runner		#544
Jul 8	Pittsburg, California	Jul 7	T R Norton		#545
Jul 8	Lancaster, California	Jul 7			#546
Jul 8	Tacoma, Washington	Jul 7	Gene Gamachi		#547
Jul 8	Rutland, Vermont	Jul 7	Mrs. Albert Steele		#550
Jul 8	Cambridge, Massachusetts	Jul 7			#552
Jul 8	Cincinnati, Ohio	Jul 7	Everett Smith		#553
Jul 8	Charleston, South Carolina	Jul 7	Albert Riggs		#558
Jul 8	Rockford, Illinois	Jul 7	Wilbur Luckey		#560
Jul 8	Riverside, California	Jul 7	H.J. Stell, R.V. Allen,		#563
Jul 8	Denver, Colorado	Jul 7	T/Sgt John Todd		#564
Jul 8	Ballard, Washington	Jul 7	Bill Goodman		#566
Jul 8	Okauchee, Wisconsin	Jul 7	Charles Pettit		#568
Jul 8	Seattle, Washington	Jul 7	Peggy Reyes		#569
Jul 8	Seattle, Washington	Jul 7	Alice Mahoney		#571
Jul 8	Elkorn, Wisconsin	Jul 7	Kenneth Jones		#574
Jul 8	Brandenburg, Kentucky	Jul 7	E L Ornstein		#575
Jul 8	Phillipsburg, New Jersey	Jul 7	Margaret Isarek		#581
Jul 8	Tampa, Florida	Jul 7	John Garcia		#582
Jul 8	Denver, Colorado	Jul 7	Sally Hart		#583
Jul 8	Denver, Colorado	Jul 7	Sally Hart		#584
Jul 8	Culver City, California	Jul 7	Evelyn Keel		#586
Jul 8	San Francisco, California	Jul 7	Gerald Lewis		#587
Jul 8	Santa Rosa, California	Jul 7	Four Santa Rosa witnesses		#588
Jul 8	Berkeley, California	Jul 7	Mrs Robert Turley		#589
Jul 8	Chattanooga, Tennessee	Jul 7	Walter Henderson		#590
Jul 8	Hixson, Tennessee	Jul 7	Irving Johnson		#591
Jul 8	Hixson, Tennessee	Jul 7	Irving Johnson		#592
Jul 8	Verdi, Nevada	Jul 7	Harry Rose George		#593
Jul 8	Tampa, Florida	Jul 7	Russell Pollar		#594
Jul 8	Madison, Wisconsin	Jul 7	Richard Y Schulkin		#596
Jul 8	Cicero, Illinois	Jul 7	Richard Allen		#597
Jul 8	Glasgow, Illinois	Jul 7	J C Star		#598
Jul 8	Chicago, Illinois	Jul 7	Barney Dugan		#599
Jul 8	Tulsa, Oklahoma	Jul 7	Marvin LeBow		#601
Jul 8	Enid, Oklahoma	Jul 7	Ed Horbig		#602
Jul 8	Gettysburg, Pennsylvania	Jul 7	Frank Toms & date		#603
Jul 8	Seattle, Washington	Jul 7	Jack Hartley		#605
Jul 8	Elkhorn, Wisconsin	Jul 7	Kenneth Johnes, R.J. Southey	Pilots, Richard Shaver interviewed	#606
Jul 8	Denver, Colorado	Jul 7	Mike Miller		#607
Jul 8	Denver, Colorado	Jul 7	Mike Miller		#608
Jul 8	St. Louis, Missouri	Jul 7	Ed Hooley		#610
Jul 8	Philadelphia, Pennsylvania	Jul 7	Henry Quin		#611
Jul 8	New Haven, Connecticut	Jul 7	George Johnston		#612
Jul 8	New Haven, Connecticut	Jul 7	George Johnston		#613
Jul 8	Sacramento, California	Jul 7	Rev L L Ransom		#614
Jul 8	Dos Rios, California	Jul 7	Mrs Gus Garner		#615
Jul 8	Dos Rios, California	Jul 7	Mrs Gus Garner		#616
Jul 8	Seattle, Washington	Jul 7	Larry Anderson		#617
Jul 8	Seattle, Washington	Jul 7	W M Reynolds		#618
Jul 8	Renton, Washington	Jul 7	Mrs J W Reid		#619
Jul 8	Seattle, Washington	Jul 7	Jack Linn		#620
Jul 8	Seattle, Washington	Jul 7	Neal Mire		#621
Jul 8	Seattle, Washington	Jul 7	Mrs R C Slosson		#622
Jul 8	Seattle, Washington	Jul 7	Gene Hotovitski		#623
Jul 8	Seattle, Washington	Jul 7	Gene Hotovitski		#624
Jul 8	McAlester, Oklahoma	Jul 7	Mrs John Alexander		#625
Jul 8	E Minneapolis, Minnesota	Jul 7	Dean Ireton		#626
Jul 8	Malibu Beach, California	Jul 7	Jerry Chase		#627
Jul 8	Chicago, Illinois	Jul 7	Ann Fritchley		#628
Jul 8	Charleston, South Carolina	Jul 7	J J Kornahrens		#629
Jul 8	Beverly Hills, California	Jul 7	Jerry McAdams		#631
Jul 8	Beverly Hills, California	Jul 7	Jerry McAdams		#632
Jul 8	New Haven, Connecticut	Jul 7	John Evans		#633
Jul 8	Peoria, Illinois	Jul 7	Michael Boyer		#634
Jul 8	Seattle, Washington	Jul 7	George Fosberg		#635
Jul 8	Hollywood, California	Jul 7	Ralph Whitmore		#636
Jul 8	Hollywood area, California	Jul 7			#637
Jul 8	Tampa, Florida	Jul 7	George Gortez		#638
Jul 8	Montgomery, Alabama	Jul 7	Tommy Estes		#639
Jul 8	Montgomery, Alabama	Jul 7	Tommy Estes		#640
Jul 8	Des Moines, Iowa	Jul 7	Merle Steffenson		#641
Jul 8	East Peoria, Illinois	Jul 7	Forrest L Higgenbotham		#642
Jul 8	Asheville, North Carolina	Jul 7	Carroll Emery		#643
Jul 8	Charleston, South Carolina	Jul 7	Mary Strickland		#644
Jul 8	Oklahoma City, Oklahoma	Jul 7	Patsy Morgan		#645
Jul 8	Off New Haven, Connecticut	Jul 7	Peter Santos		#647
Jul 8	Off New Haven, Connecticut	Jul 7	Peter Santos		#648
Jul 8	Asheville, North Carolina	Jul 7	Fred C Meekins		#649
Jul 8	Columbus, Ohio	Jul 7	Charles Williams, Robert Fish, George Whitacre, Wendell Rice, William Santschi		#650
Jul 8	Pontiac, Michigan	Jul 7	Albert Weaver	Photographed, published on Jul 8,	#651
Jul 8	Manchester, New Hampshire	Jul 7	Roger Plaisant		#652
Jul 8	Rome, Maine	Jul 7	Orrin Williams & wife		#653
Jul 8	Sacramento, California	Jul 7	Ralph Martin & family		#654
Jul 8	Medford, Oregon	Jul 7	David W Chase		#656
Jul 8	St Louis, Missouri	Jul 7	Allen Tanner		#657
Jul 8	University City, Missouri	Jul 7	Floyd Emert		#658
Jul 8	Winthrop, Maine	Jul 7	Spectators at outdoor		#659
Jul 8	Manchester, Maine	Jul 7	Charles Crockett		#660
Jul 8	Asheville, North Carolina	Jul 7	Bob Rumbough		#661
Jul 8	Milton, Wisconsin	Jul 7	Paul Schroeder		#662
Jul 8	Oklahoma City, Oklahoma	Jul 7	Mrs J P Gibbs		#663
Jul 8	Oklahoma City, Oklahoma	Jul 7	Mrs J P Gibbs		#664
Jul 8	Oklahoma City, Oklahoma	Jul 7	Anna Nedblalek		#665
Jul 8	Marion, Alabama	Jul 7	Helen Derenson, Miriam P. Moore		#666
Jul 8	Louisville, Kentucky	Jul 7	W B Robinson		#667
Jul 8	Louisville, Kentucky	Jul 7	Mrs J F Sayre		#668
Jul 8	Jackson, Mississippi	Jul 7	Leslie Everett		#669
Jul 8	Waterville, Maine	Jul 7	Perry Mosher		#670
Jul 8	Detroit, Michigan	Jul 7	Elizabeth Mason		#671
Jul 8	Witchita, Kansas	Jul 7	S.B. Keefer, John Crosby		#672
Jul 8	Birmingham, Alabama	Jul 7	Horace Guttery		#673
Jul 8	Salt Lake City, Utah	Jul 7	Mrs. Jack Caffey (Coffey)		#674
Jul 8	Chicago, Illinois	Jul 7	Thomas J Gorman		#676
Jul 8	Chicago, Illinois	Jul 7	Leonard Blommaert		#677
Jul 8	Madison, Wisconsin	Jul 7	Nancy Goff, Richard Y. Schulkin		#684
Jul 8	Omaha, Nebraska	Jul 7	Gertrude Sniffen		#685
Jul 8	Lillian, North Carolina	Jul 7	Albert Dugan (Al Duke), Charles Cross		#686
Jul 8	Racine, Wisconsin	Jul 7	Glenn Jensen		
Jul 8	St. Louis, Missouri	Jul 7	Allen Tanner, James Martin, Ed Hooley		
Jul 8	El Paso, Texas	Jul 7	Walter K. Turner, David Hunt, John Jordan		
Jul 8	Houston, Texas	Jul 7	Norman Hargrave		
Jul 8	Sydney, Australia	Jul 7	E.J Walters, Jack Parker		
Jul 8	Bonham, Texas	Jul 7	R.R. Whitlock		
Jul 8	Corsicana, Texas	Jul 7	G.B. Garrett		
Jul 8	Bryan, Texas	Jul 7	Mrs. G.A. Tanner		
Jul 8	Rockport, Texas	Jul 7	Mrs. H.C. Mullinax		
Jul 8	Abilene, Texas	Jul 7	Mrs. Cap Newman		
Jul 8	Snyder, Texas	Jul 7	J.E. Hardee	Disintegrated	
Jul 8	Guernsey, California	Jul 7	Clarence Demick, John Powell, Douglas Powell		
Jul 8	Saanich, British Columbia	Jul 7	M.E. Batemane, T. Moore, M. Sheridan, R. Beecher		
Jul 8	Oakland, California	Jul 7	Ervin Grimm, Else May Grim, Walter Kovacs, Mel Freitas, A. Robb, Barbara Richardson, C.L. Bunch, Betty Turley, Emily Grant,		
Jul 8	Austin, Texas	Jul 7	Clifton Bowen, John Caldwell		
Jul 8	Danville, Alabama	Jul 7	Lucile Hullet, Kenneth Patterson		
Jul 8	Natchez, Mississippi	Jul 7	Evelyn Wadsworth, Charles Bromwell		
Jul 8	Dayton, Ohio	Jul 7	Dick Roll, Wanda Bennett, Bill Jamison, Ralph Williams, Bob Galante,Russell Randall,		
Jul 8	Jacksonville, Florida	Jul 7	Bob Hart		
Jul 8	Columbia, South Carolina	Jul 7	Carroll Hadley, Guy Getkey, James Jabon, Marion Brown, Stuart Hope		
Jul 8	Winfield, Kansas	Jul 7	Mrs. John Kemp		
Jul 8	Alexandria, Louisiana	Jul 7	William J. Melton		
Jul 8	Barsdale, Oklahoma	Jul 7	L. D. Edgington		
Jul 8	Fox, Oklahoma	Jul 7	Flossie Fore, Richard Hobson		
Jul 8	Dewey, Oklahoma	Jul 7	E.V Keller		
Jul 8	Salt Lake City, Utah	Jul 7	Kimball		
Jul 8	Industrial City, Missouri	Jul 7	John W. Hawkins, Virgil Ashley		
Jul 8	North Hollywood, California	Jul 7	Mrs. Richard Horn		
Jul 8	Knoxville, Tennessee	Jul 7	E.G. McGhee		
Jul 8	Shreveport, Louisiana	Jul 7	Marvin V. Thomas		
Jul 8	Paris, Texas	Jul 7	George Mims, Billy Mims, Mary O. Doolin		
Jul 8	Freeland, Pennsylvania	Jul 7	Anna Bradish, George Nemo, John Stenga, Michael Berta,		
Jul 8	Washington,D.C.	Jul 7	Jack LaBous		
Jul 8	Lodi, California	Jul 7	George Lloyd		
Jul 8	Meridan, Connecticut	Jul 7	Tony Gambino, Stanley Zukerman, Matthew Jordan		
Jul 8	Springfield, Missouri	Jul 7	Frank Walker		
Jul 8	Chico, California	Jul 7	Mrs. P.H. Hinkley		
Jul 8	Mexico City, Mexico	Jul 7	Unnamed		
Jul 8	Montreal, Quebec	Jul 7	Louis Blanchette		
Jul 8	Mitchell, South Dakota	Jul 7	Mrs. Ed Anderson, J. Ralph Horn		
Jul 8	Poll City, Alabama	Jul 8			#702
Jul 8	St. Louis,Missouri	Jul 8	Oliver Obenhaus		#703
Jul 8	Chicago, Illinois	Jul 8	Mabel Vinterum		#704
Jul 8	Jeffersontown, Kentucky	Jul 8	Mary Wheeler		#706
Jul 8	Denver, Colorado	Jul 8	Herbert Ebert & wife		#707
Jul 8	Denver, Colorado	Jul 8	Mrs D E Marvin		#708
Jul 8	Denver, Colorado	Jul 8	Fred Cullins		#709
Jul 8	St. Luis Obispo, California	Jul 8	George Boll, Mrs John Blake, Mrs Calvan Andrews		#711
Jul 8	Portland, Oregon	Jul 8	Mrs Simon T Hernandez		#715
Jul 8	Portland, Oregon	Jul 8	Mrs Simon T Hernandez		#716
Jul 8	Cambridge, Massachusetts	Jul 8	Silas Flashman		#718
Jul 8	Portland, Oregon	Jul 8	Mrs Simon T Hernandez		#719
Jul 8	Portland, Oregon	Jul 8	Mrs Simon T Hernandez		#720
Jul 8	Spokane, Washington	Jul 8	Howard LaRose, Slvia Ahlstrand		#731
Jul 8	Spokane, Washington	Jul 8	J.P. Tracy, Mrs A.L. Blanc,L.W. Hyatt		#732
Jul 8	Spokane, Washington	Jul 8	J.P. Tracy, A.L. Blanc		#732
Jul 8	Spokane, Washington	Jul 8	Irvin Neubauer		#737
Jul 8	Spokane, Washington	Jul 8	Joe Harwood		#738
Jul 8	Osburn, California	Jul 8	Joe Vander Vloedt(Joe Vandervloedt) C J Landis, Eddie Jackson, and Conrad Preston		#751
Jul 8	Osburn, Idaho	Jul 8	Joe Vandervloedt, C.J. Landis, Eddie Jackson, Conrad Preston,Ervin Zorb		#751
Jul 8	St. Louis, Missouri	Jul 8	Oliver Oberhaus		
Jul 8	Youngstown,Ohio	-	George Maxin	Some time ago	
Jul 9	Rohoboth Beach, Delaware	1946	Forrest Wenyon	past ten months, Blamed Eastern Airlines crash at Fort Deposit on discs,	#6
Jul 9	Mitchell, South Dakota	Jun 8	Mrs. Ed Anderson, Emmitt Barta		#687
Jul 9	Adrian, Missouri	Jun 8	Grant Cook	Recovered disc IDed as kite	
Jul 9	Frisco, Texas	Jun 8	Robert Ardian Nix		
Jul 9	Green Springs, Alabama	Jun 18	Mrs H Akins		#14
Jul 9	Winters, Colorado	Jun 18	Ira Brannon, J.M. Phillips	'about three weeks ago'	
Jul 9	Titusville, Pennsylvania	Jun 21	Donald Bunce	coral-appearing residue purportedly from meteor undergoing analysis,	#19
Jul 9	Gainesville, Florida	Jun 23	Fred Cantrell Mrs. W.M. Pepper		
Jul 9	St. Petersburg,Florida	Jun 25	Warren C. Cable	'about two weeks ago'	
Jul 9	Rutland, Vermont	Jun 27	Mrs W F Dunning		#86
Jul 9	Grand Isle, Vermont	Jun 27	K.P. Wheeler, Paul Wheeler		
Jul 9	Rutland, Vermont	Jul 1	Rose LePan		#162
Jul 9	East Los Angeles, California	Jul 2	John Lewis Brown		#153
Jul 9	Mendon, Vermont	Jul 3	Clara Spieski		#201
Jul 9	Hattiesburg, Mississippi	Jul 3	Ben Bowlin, Faye McClelland		
Jul 9	Tacoma, Washington	Jul 5	Lillian Emblem,Marie Reed		#330
Jul 9	California	Jul 6	Leona McKean		#695
Jul 9	Sommerset, Pennsylvania	Jul 6	Mrs. John Buelman		
Jul 9	Fort Myers, Florida	Jul 6	George H. Bail		
Jul 9	Okauchee, Wisconsin	Jul 7	Charles Pettit		#567
Jul 9	Racine, Wisconsin	Jul 7	Four Racine residents		#678
Jul 9	Sioux City, Iowa	Jul 7	Warren Gowen		#679
Jul 9	Sioux City, Iowa	Jul 7	Warren Gowen		#680
Jul 9	Paris, Kentucky	Jul 7	George Watt		#681
Jul 9	Louisville, Kentucky	Jul 7	Robert Delara		#682
Jul 9	Louisville, Kentucky	Jul 7	AL Hixenbaugh		#683
Jul 9	Beverly Hills, California	Jul 7	Emily Stern		#688
Jul 9	Tacoma, Washington	Jul 7	M.C. Streans		#689
Jul 9	Tacoma, Washington	Jul 7	John Sameulson, Peter Walker		#690
Jul 9	California	Jul 7	Marie A Seward		#694
Jul 9	Portland, Oregon	Jul 7	Shirley Butts		#745
Jul 9	Portland, Oregon	Jul 7	Roy D. Buckmaster		#746
Jul 9	Sherman, Texas	Jul 7	Frankie Hamilton		
Jul 9	Colorado City, Colorado	Jul 7	Rance T. Dockery, Grover Buchanan		
Jul 9	Winters, Colorado	Jul 7	H.L. Crowe, James C. Jones		
Jul 9	El Dorado, Arkansas	Jul 8	E.E. Boyland		#349
Jul 9	New York, New York	Jul 8	John Heathcote		#449
Jul 9	Palmdale, California	Jul 8	Mrs. Herdliska	parent disc leading five smaller discs... somaller ones seemd to fly away, then return and be absorbed by it... like baby chicks hiding under a mother hen's wings".	#528
Jul 9	Clearwater, Florida	Jul 8	Imogene Richards		#609
Jul 9	Tacoma, Washington	Jul 8	Margaret DeMars, John Samuelson, Peter Walker, Bacon S. Coton		#630, #690
Jul 9	Phoenix, Arizona	Jul 8	William A. Rhodes	Photographed, Grudge #40,	#675
Jul 9	Jackson, Mississippi	Jul 8	E.B. Brown, Frances Wade		#691
Jul 9	Jackson, Mississippi	Jul 8	Anne Catchings		#692
Jul 9	Jackson, Mississippi	Jul 8	Ronald Pitts, John Malone		#693
Jul 9	Houston, Texas	Jul 8			#698
Jul 9	Albert Lea, Minnesota	Jul 8	William Schultz		#699
Jul 9	Albert Lea, Minnesota	Jul 8	William Schultz		#700
Jul 9	Geneva, New York	Jul 8	Unnamed Sampson College students	Dropped from sight 'in Seneca Lake',	#700
Jul 9	Lamere, North Dakota	Jul 8	Leslie Miller		#701
Jul 9	Delamere, North Dakota	Jul 8	Leslie Miller		#701
Jul 9	Fargo, North Dakota	Jul 8	Leslie Miller		#701
Jul 9	Springfield, Illinois	Jul 8	Wm Bender 802 E Wash St		#705
Jul 9	Ballard, Washington	Jul 8	Chet Proud		#710
Jul 9	St. Louis, Missouri	Jul 8	Thiemo Wolf		#711
Jul 9	San Luis Obispo, California	Jul 8	Mrs George Boll		#713
Jul 9	Portland, Oregon	Jul 8	Mrs Simon T Hernandez		#714
Jul 9	Portland, Oregon	Jul 8	Mrs Simon T Hernandez		#721
Jul 9	Portland, Oregon	Jul 8	Mrs Simon T Hernandez		#722
Jul 9	Denver, Colorado	Jul 8	Pfc Richard McNulty		#723
Jul 9	Chicago, Illinois	Jul 8			#724
Jul 9	Chicago, Illinois	Jul 8	Donald Klipstein		#725
Jul 9	Pueblo, Colorado	Jul 8	Unnamed	Ordinance depot workers,	#726
Jul 9	Denver, Colorado	Jul 8	Donald Wentee		#728
Jul 9	Tucson, Arizona	Jul 8	William Holland		#729
Jul 9	Douglas, Arizona	Jul 8	Mrs Ray Wilder		#730
Jul 9	Alton, New Hampshire	Jul 8	Thomas F Dale		#733
Jul 9	Santa Catalina Is, California	Jul 8	Bob Jung		#734
Jul 9	Pierpont, South Carolina	Jul 8	Johnny Crowe		#739
Jul 9	Shingler Springs, California	Jul 8	Donald Barter		#740
Jul 9	Mitchell, South Dakota	Jul 8	Mrs Ed Anderson		#741
Jul 9	Sacramento, California	Jul 8	Savina Rosette		#742
Jul 9	Burbank, California	Jul 8	John Taylor		#743
Jul 9	Catalina Island, California	Jul 8	Alvio Russo, Kenneth Johnson, Bob Jung	Photographed,	#743
Jul 9	Portland, Oregon	Jul 8	Bill Gore		#744
Jul 9	Portland, Oregon	Jul 8	Mrs Frankie Brinkosh		#747
Jul 9	Hollywood, California	Jul 8	Sheldon Lowenkopf		#748
Jul 9	Hollywood, California	Jul 8	Robert Rosser		#749
Jul 9	Hollywood, California	Jul 8	Gerald Leve		#750
Jul 9	Seattle, Washington	Jul 8	Earl Klenpke		#752
Jul 9	Sioux City, Iowa	Jul 8	J.V. Gibbons		#753
Jul 9	Sioux City, Iowa	Jul 8	J.P. Garvey		#754
Jul 9	Pennsgrove, New Jersey	Jul 8	Hundreds of witnesses		#756
Jul 9	East Falls, Pennsylvania	Jul 8	Tom Morrell		#757
Jul 9	Cheltenham, Pennsylvania	Jul 8	Thomas Miller		#758
Jul 9	Springfield, Illinois	Jul 8	John C Burs		#759
Jul 9	Las Vegas, Nevada	Jul 8	W S Erwin		#760
Jul 9	Trenton, New Jersey	Jul 8			#761
Jul 9	West Branch, Pennsylvania	Jul 8	Bert Bishop		#762
Jul 9	Boise, Idaho	Jul 8	Oliver Gregerson, Vesta Mitchell	Ash fragments emitted by midair disc,	#762
Jul 9	Topeka, Kansas	Jul 8	Mrs Leonard Sheafor		#763
Jul 9	Topeka, Kansas	Jul 8	Mrs Leonard Sheafor		#764
Jul 9	Milwaukee, Wisconsin	Jul 8	Two Milwaukee residents		#765
Jul 9	San Leandro, California	Jul 8	Hundreds of residents		#766
Jul 9	Chicago, Illinois	Jul 8	Peter Monte		#767
Jul 9	Pearl Harbor, Hawaii	Jul 8	Ted Pardue, Douglas Kahcerle, Donald Ferguson, Morris Kzamme, Albert Delancy		#769
Jul 9	Madison, Wisconsin	Jul 8	Collins Reese, Tommy O'Sheridan, Jerry Neu, Fred Luhman & Bob Walsh		#770
Jul 9	Cudahy, Wisconsin	Jul 8	3 16-year-old Cudahy boys		#771
Jul 9	York, Nebraska	Jul 8			#772
Jul 9	Bush Creek, Texas	Jul 8	Numerous frightened residents		#773
Jul 9	Chicago, Illinois	Jul 8	Wayne R. Smith		#775
Jul 9	Chicago, Illinois	Jul 8	Marvin Goldberg		#776
Jul 9	Madison, Wisconsin	Jul 8	Five young teen-aged		#777
Jul 9	Madison, Wisconsin	Jul 8	Five young teen-aged		#778
Jul 9	Sacramento, California	Jul 8	Jerry Grayham		#779
Jul 9	Menominee, Michigan	Jul 8	Leo Sequin, Floyd Lecanne		#781
Jul 9	Menominee, Michigan	Jul 8	Leo Sequin, Floyd Lacanne, Edward Gramm	note	#781
Jul 9	East Liberty, Ohio	Jul 8	James A. Rhoades		#793
Jul 9	Boise, Idaho	Jul 8	Dave Johnson	Aviation editor,	#794
Jul 9	Louisville, Kentucky	Jul 8	Al Hixenbaugh		
Jul 9	Santa Rosa, California	Jul 8	Robert Morgan,Mrs. P. Boglio, Billy Flynn, R.W. Nelson	'hovering over navy air station'	
Jul 9	Richmond, Indiana	Jul 8	Richard Ferguson, Jesse Hubbel		
Jul 9	Minatare, Nebraska	Jul 8	Robert Ferguson	7x14" sandstone-like object discovered in field	
Jul 9	Colorado Springs, Colorado	Jul 8	Hurree Gil Berath, Stan Philips, Chico Macrae	Hunters report 'scores of discs which crashed to the ground'	
Jul 9	El Paso, Texas	Jul 8	Dorsey White, Ottive Magill		
Jul 9	Columbia, South Carolina	Jul 8	Jimmy Rion, Ann Rawl		
Jul 9	Austin, Texas	Jul 8	George Calhoun, Lillian Wester	Fireball IDed as meteorite	
Jul 9	Circleville, Ohio	Jul 8	David C. Heffner	Recovered disc IDed as kite	
Jul 9	Chattanooga, Tennessee	Jul 8	William Reece, John Head,G.W. Helms, George Barker, John Jackson,William Thrasher, John Brenson, Lester Grant		
Jul 9	Manitowoc, Wisconsin	Jul 8	Fred Olson		
Jul 9	Wausau, Wisconsin	Jul 8	B.A.McDonald, Wayne Koski		
Jul 9	Appleton, Wisconsin	Jul 8	Clarence Hostettler		
Jul 9	Clifton, Colorado	Jul 8	George Garber		
Jul 9	Bellwood, Pennsylvania	Jul 8	Frank Eggolsdorf, Louis Lombardo, Al Pielmier, Tom Nicemyer, Thomas Parker		
Jul 9	Henderson, Texas	Jul 8	Carl Estes	Baseball games stopped in Henderson and Kilgore; IDed as searchlights	
Jul 9	Carrizozo, New Mexico	Jul 8	Mark Sloan,Grady Warren, Nolan Lovelace, Ray Shaferm J.D. Cochran	Baseball games stopped in Henderson and Kilgore; IDed as searchlights	
Jul 9	Las Cruces, New Mexico	Jul 8	Robert Davis	Object splashed into drainage canal	
Jul 9	Mexia, Texas	Jul 8	W.A. Beck, J.P. Reynolds, G.W. Hopson, R.S. Bozeman,		
Jul 9	Mora, New Mexico	Jul 8	Barney F. Cruz, Richard O. Branch		
Jul 9	Red Bay, Alabama	Jul 8	J.H. Minga	Near mid-collision	
Jul 9	London, Ontario	Jul 8	James Ferguson		
Jul 9	Oakland, California	Jul 8	Richard Secor		
Jul 9	Big Sandy, Texas	Jul 8	J.M. Mings		
Jul 9	Port Isabel, Texas	Jul 8	Narcy Gutierrez,Weldon Weaver, Pete Hisler, Lawrence Turner		
Jul 9	Corsicana, Texas	Jul 8	Mrs. Mose Armstrong, Herman Youngblood, Adkins, Henderson, Barabara Leftwich, Jack Leftwich, M. Ellison		
Jul 9	Milwaukee, Wisconsin	Jul 8	A. Wood		
Jul 9	Wichita Falls, Texas	Jul 8	J.B. Bentley		
Jul 9	Brattleboro, Vermont	Jul 8	Mrs. H.A. Bixby		
Jul 9	Millairdville, British Columbia	Jul 8	Antoine Beauregard		
Jul 9	Dayton, Ohio	Jul 8	Judith Ann Foland, Mrs. Arthur Schermbeck		
Jul 9	Walla Walla, Washington	Jul 8	McGillicuddy		
Jul 9	Victoria, British Columbia	Jul 8	George Bateson		
Jul 9	Palestine, Texas	Jul 8	Paul Stanford, Bud Everitt, Mrs. Lorens Shrader, Mrs. Marian Reed		
Jul 9	Pearl Harbor, Hawaii	Jul 8	Douglas Kacherle, 100 Navy men		
Jul 9	Seattle, Washington	Jul 8	Earl Klempke		
Jul 9	Osbornville, New Jersey	Jul 8	Carlson		
Jul 9	Hollywood, California	Jul 8	Eva Mitchell, Neva Bilderback, Jack Bilderback, Martha Bigelow, John Taylor, Charles Herbez		
Jul 9	Bridgeport, Pennsylvania	Jul 8	Christ Mastros		
Jul 9	Conowingo, Pennsylvania	Jul 8	Floy Breneman, Frank Ring		
Jul 9	Sabattus, Maine	Jul 8	Melvin T. Davis, Jerome Davis, Lee Jordan, Carrol Jordan		
Jul 9	Lansing, Michigan	Jul 8	Dave Wyatt, Dick Tabor		
Jul 9	Elloree, South Carolina	Jul 8	A.C. Montgomery		
Jul 9	Romeo, Tennessee	Jul 8	Eugene Carter, Edmond Carter,Marjorie Conduff, Dale Kite, Bee Kite, Mrs. Robert Hardin		
Jul 9	Rapid City, South Dakota	Jul 8	Mrs. Lorne Humphrey, Margaret Humphrey, Arlene Johnson	Handbills and false report as advertising publicity stunt for local eating establishment	
Jul 9	Virginia, Minnesota	Jul 8	Orville Gunderson		
Jul 9	Crookston, Minnesota	Jul 8	Mrs. Don Johnson		
Jul 9	Council Grove, Kansas	Jul 8	Alberta Pullins, E.S. Osborn		
Jul 9	Chicago, Illinois	Jul 9	Thomas O'Brian		#785
Jul 9	Chicago, Illinois	Jul 9	Thomas O'Brian		#786
Jul 9	Springfield, Illinois	Jul 9	Marvin Wright		#788
Jul 9	Hopkinsville, Kentucky	Jul 9	William Sherill		#789
Jul 9	Everett, Massachusetts	Jul 9	Joseph Mulledy, Kenneth Arlen		#792
Jul 9	Nogales, Arizona	Jul 9	Guy Fuller, Pete Mincheff,Sam Marcus, Arthur Doane		#797
Jul 9	Placerville, California	Jul 11	Ms Maude Lawyer		#696
Jul 10	Murtaigh, Idaho	Jun 17	Mrs. Clyde McFarland		
Jul 10	Provo, Utah	Jul 1	G.W. Eades		#116
Jul 10	Willoughby Lake, Vermont	Jul 2	Mrs. Arthur C. Reilly		
Jul 10	Bellefontaine, Ohio	Jul 5	Frank Mifflin		#784
Jul 10	Brent, Alabama	Jul 6	Eloise Medders, Minor Medders, Mrs. Guy Ward, Raymond Medders, Betty Murphy		
Jul 10	Spokane, Washington	Jul 8	James Davidson		#735
Jul 10	Spokane, Washington	Jul 8	Paul Baenen		#736
Jul 10	Boise, Idaho	Jul 8	Oliver Gregerson	Released ash, analyzed	#768
Jul 10	Palestine, Texas	Jul 8	Horace Valentine		#774
Jul 10	Boise, Idaho	Jul 8	Dave Johnson		#794
Jul 10	Chicago, Illinois	Jul 9	Robert Washer		#539
Jul 10	Manchester, New Hampshire	Jul 9	Mrs Earl O Anderson		#787
Jul 10	Nashua, New Hampshire	Jul 9	Omer J Levesque		#791
Jul 10	Boise, Idaho	Jul 9	William W. Hunt		#795
Jul 10	Denver, Colorado	Jul 9	Unidentified witnesses		#796
Jul 10	Yuma, Arizona	Jul 9	Henry Vardela		#798
Jul 10	Rollinsville, Colorado	Jul 9			#799
Jul 10	Boise, Idaho	Jul 9	Warren Noe,Bob Ayers,Farm Sabala		#800
Jul 10	Chewelah, Washington	Jul 9	Buell Throop		#801
Jul 10	Spokane, Washington	Jul 9	Cliff Markham		#803
Jul 10	West Milford, New Jersey	Jul 9	Wm T Silverthorn		#804
Jul 10	Koppel, Pennsylvania	Jul 9	Rudi Petti		#805
Jul 10	Anchorage, Alaska	Jul 9	Judy Kerr Vicky		#806
Jul 10	Decatur, Texas	Jul 9	Mattie M. Cole		
Jul 10	Santa Rosa, California	Jul 9	Adele Brooks, A.L. Stancoff		
Jul 10	Hillsboro, Texas	Jul 9	Tracy Curry		
Jul 10	Douglas, Arizona	Jul 9	Mrs. D.C. Kline		
Jul 10	Sweetwater, Texas	Jul 9	C.B. Brackley		
Jul 10	Morristown, Tennessee	Jul 9	Sally Grubb		
Jul 10	Greenville, North Carolina	Jul 9	Mrs. John Phillips		
Jul 10	Auburn, California	Jul 9	Albert Saladana, John Flint		
Jul 10	Sutton, Nebraska	Jul 9	Henry Fuehrer		
Jul 10	Virginia Dale, Colorado	Jul 9	George Binks		
Jul 10	Broome's Island, Maryland	Jul 9	James R. Barnes, Mrs. Thawley Parks		
Jul 10	Douglas, Arizona	Jul 9	D.C. Kline		
Jul 10	Salt Lake City, Utah	Jul 9	Bill Dennison		
Jul 10	El Paso, Texas	Jul 9	John Hill, Betty Belmont		
Jul 10	Santa Rosa, California	Jul 9	L.E. Anderson, J.L. Anderson, Bob Kirk, Charles Parker, Opal Parker, Rico Furia		
Jul 10	Albuquerque, New Mexico	Jul 9	C.M. Conrady		
Jul 10	Westminster, Colorado	Jul 10	Four witnesses		#809
Jul 10	Albany, Georgia		A.T. Spies	more than a week ago	
Jul 11	San Rafael, California	Jul 8	John Cockcroft		#780
Jul 11	Petoskey, Michigan	Jul 9			#782
Jul 11	Cheboygen, Michigan	Jul 9			#783
Jul 11	Redwood City, California	Jul 9	Benjamin Ballard		#807
Jul 11	Morristown, New Jersey	Jul 10	John H. Janssen	Photographed	#790
Jul 11	Ripley, Ontario	Jul 10			#808
Jul 11	Burien, Washington	Jul 10	Don Reber		#811
Jul 11	Seattle, Washington	Jul 10	Armeta Hearst		#812
Jul 11	Seattle, Washington	Jul 10	William C Hobrock		#813
Jul 11	Troutsdale, Colorado	Jul 10			#814
Jul 11	Niwot, Colorado	Jul 10			#815
Jul 11	Aurora, Colorado	Jul 10			#816
Jul 11	Upper Snake R Valley, Idaho	Jul 10	Alyce Polson		#817
Jul 11	Upper Snake R Valley, Idaho	Jul 10	Alyce Polson		#818
Jul 11	Carnation, Washington	Jul 10	Two adults		#820
Jul 11	St. Petersburg, Florida	Jul 10	Mrs. William Krahenbuehl		#821
Jul 11	Sulphur Springs, Texas	Jul 10	Irene Carpenter, Louis Smith		
Jul 12	Codroy, Newfoundland	Jul 10			#826
Jul 12	St. Petersburg, Florida	Jul 11	Robert Downs		#827
Jul 12	St. Petersburg, Florida	Jul 11	Charles Smart		#828
Jul 13	Taladega, Alabama	Jul 12	Twelve witnesses		#830
Jul 13	Boise, Idaho	Jul 12	John F. Brown		#832
Jul 13	Boise, Idaho	Jul 12	Ramona Blair		#833
Jul 13	Columbiana, Alabama	Jul 12			#836
Jul 18	Concord, California	Jul 15	Col Frank A Flynn		#841
Jul 21	Concord, California	Jul 15	Col Frank A Flynn		#842
Jul 21	Idaho Falls, Idaho	Jul 20	James Denton		#842
Jul 22	Boise, Idaho	Jul 21	James E Petteway		#844
Jul 23	Meriden, Connecticut	Jul 22	Dorothy Treiber		#845
Jul 24	Boise, Idaho	Jul 23	E K Prestel		#846
Jul 25	Chilliwack, British Columbia	Jul 24	Mrs L Ker		#847
Jul 29	Mtn Home, Idaho	Jul 28	Capt Chas F Gibian		#849
Jul 30	Boise, Idaho	Jul 28	Stanley Ewing		#848
Jul 30	Wendell, Idaho	Jul 29	Jack Skillern		#851
	Douglas, Arizona	Jun 10	Coral Lorenzen		#7
	Aloha, Oregon	Jun 15	Mrs A Krause		#1
	Milo, Oregon	Jun 15	Robert Wright		#2
	Spokane, Washington	Jun 21	Guy R Overman		#20
	Greenfield, Massachusetts	Jun 22			#22
	El Paso, Texas	Jun 22	Dr G O Dickson		#24
	Boise, Idaho	Jun 24	Donald S Whitehead		#40
	Montgomery, Alabama	Jun 28	Capt W H Kayko		#102
	Lake Mead, Nevada	Jun 28	Lt E B Armstrong		#95
	Lake Mead, Nevada	Jun 28	Lt E B Armstrong		#96
	Moscow, Idaho	Jun 29	Frank Lark		#112
	Williams Air Base, Arizona	Jun 30	Lt William G McGinty		#115
	Boise, Idaho	Jun 30	Angelo Donofrio		#123
	Harborside, Maine	Jul 3	John F Cole		#187
	Redmond, Oregon	Jul 4	C J Bogne		#220
	Portland, Oregon	Jul 4	Kenneth A McDowell		#231
	Portland, Oregon	Jul 4	E A Evans		#239
	Arcadia, California	Jul 4	C P Quickel.		#248
	Utica, Michigan	Jul 4	Warren M Edwards		#274
	West Trenton, New Jersey	Jul 4	Marion Marshall		#279
	Baltimore, Maryland	Jul 5	Kathleen Norris		#328
	Dallas, Texas	Jul 5	J A Reeder		#352
	Clay Center, Kansas	Jul 6	Major A B Browning		#402
	10 mi SBoise, Idaho	Jul 6	Paul P Bates		#406
	Fairfield, California	Jul 6	Capt Jms H Burniston		#423
	S Central area, Wyoming	Jul 6	David A Kenney		#428
	Chicago, Illinois	Jul 7	Barney Dugan		#600
	Medford, Oregon	Jul 7	David W Chase		#655
	Muroc Air Base, California	Jul 8	1st Lt Jos C McHenry		#712
	Portland, Oregon	Jul 8	Mrs Simon T Hernandez		#717
	Pueblo, Colorado	Jul 8	Group of men		#727
	Los Angeles, California	Jul 8	Muroc Air Base pilot		#755
	Midland, Michigan	Jul 9	Raymond Edward Lane		#802
	Douglas, Arizona	Jul 10	Mrs L B Ogle		#810
	Fort Sumner, New Mexico	Jul 10	Lincoln LaPaz		#819
	Riverside, California	Jul 10	L W Face		#822
	Codroy, Newfoundland	Jul 10	3 witnesses		#823
	Codroy, Newfoundland	Jul 10			#824
	Codroy, Newfoundland	Jul 10			#825
	Douglas, Arizona	Jul 11	Mrs W P Hopkins		#829
	Utah lake, Utah	Jul 12	Earl Page		#831
	Boise, Idaho	Jul 12	Ramona Blair		#834
	Seattle, Washington	Jul 12	Seaman John C Kennedy		#835
	Dayton, Ohio	Jul 13			#837
	South Gardner, Massachusetts	Jul 13	Warren Baker Eames		#838
	Seattle, Washington	Jul 13	Al Rickey		#839
	Seattle, Washington	Jul 13	A W Salvino & family		#840
	Harmon Field, Newfoundland	Jul 20	Military personnel		#843
	Mtn Home, Idaho	Jul 28	Capt Chas F Gibian		#850
	Hamilton Field, California	Jul 29	Capt Wm H Ryherd		#852
	Hamilton Field, California	Jul 29	Capt Wm H Ryherd		#853

- ^{A} Index number from Bloecher (1967)
