= Jacob Salatun =

Indonesian air marshal (1927–2012)

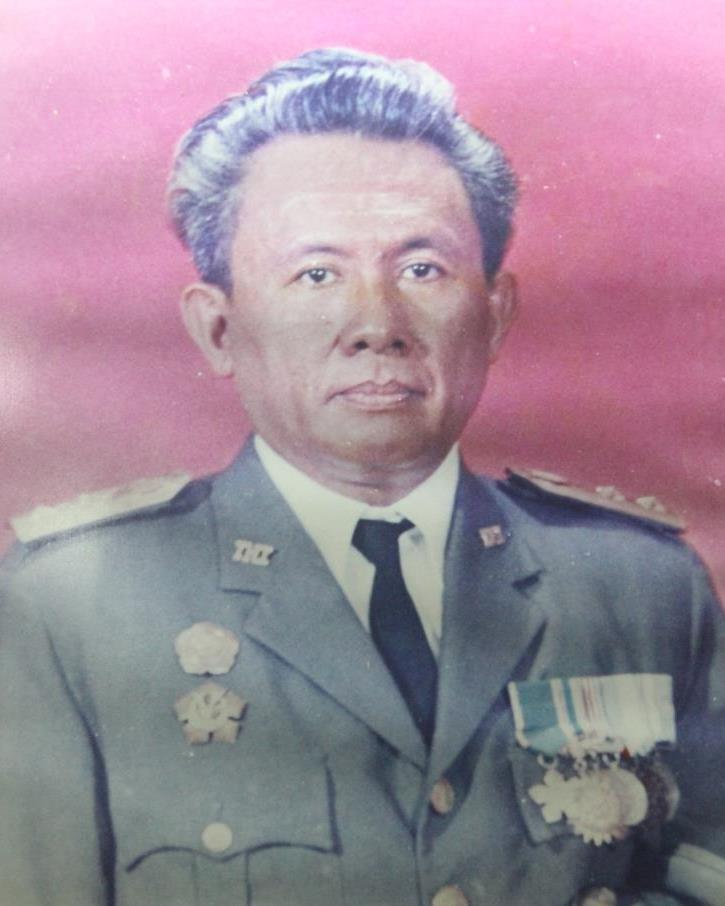
Air Marshal Jacob Salatun

Raden Jacob Salatun (29 May 1927 in Banyumas – 3 February 2012 in Jakarta) was an Indonesia Air Force 3-star officer (Air marshal). He is known as a founder of Indonesia's National Institute of Aeronautics and Space in 1963. Between 28 March 1966 and 25 July 1966 he was Minister of Industry in Indonesia.

Salatun observed UFO phenomena in 1974. Two of his famous works are "Menjingkap Rahasia piring terbang" (Revealing the Secret of Flying Saucer) in 1960, and "UFO: Salah Satu Masalah Dunia Masa Kini" (UFO, One Of The Present Riddles) in 1982. He established SUFOI (Indonesian UFO Study) in the 1980s. In a letter published in 1974 he wrote, "I am convinced that we must study the UFO problem seriously for reasons of sociology, technology, and security."
