= Bridge of Tilt =

Coordinates: 56.771024°N 3.840913°W

Bridge of Tilt: Scottish Gaelic: Drochaid Theilt
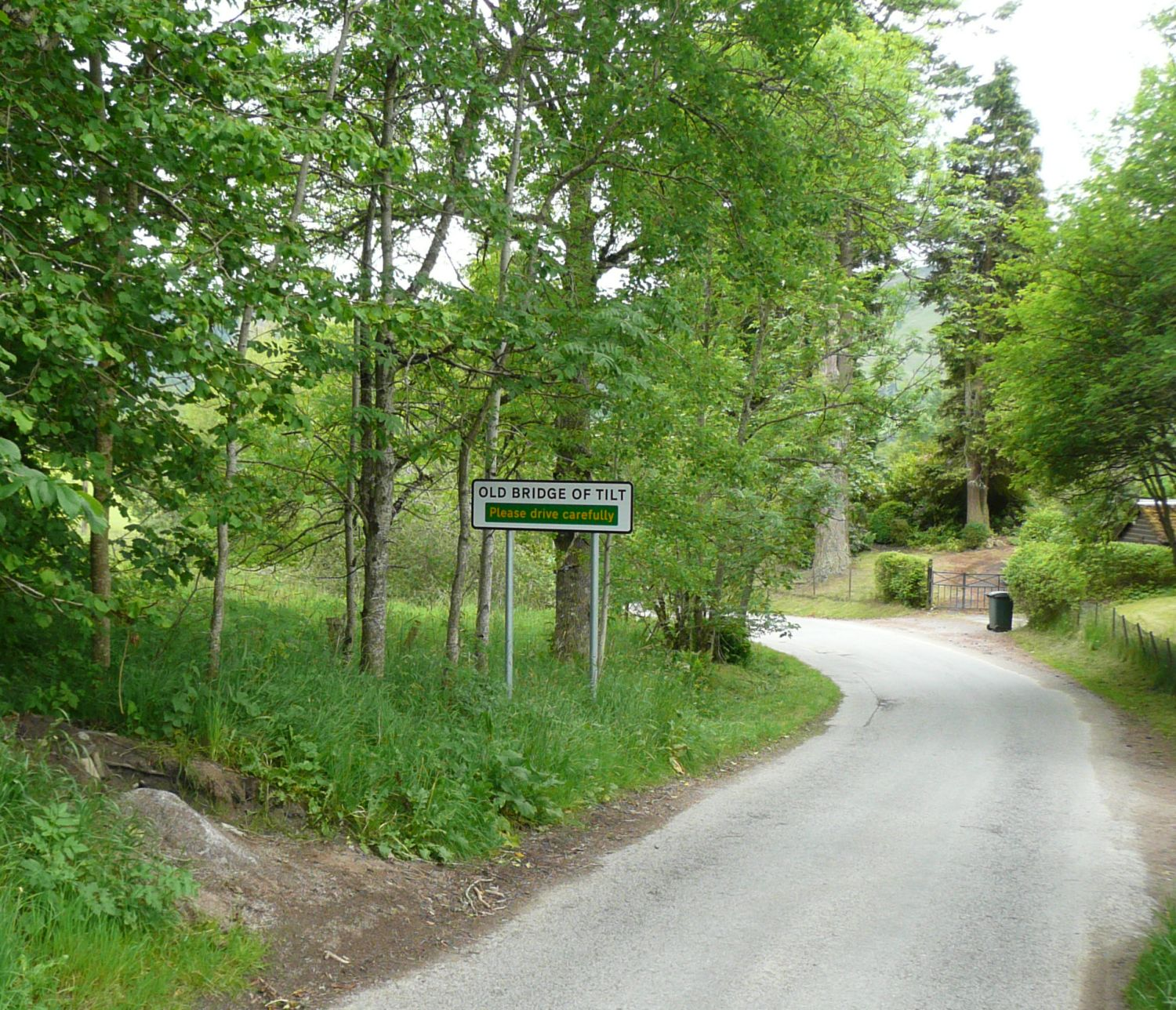
- The entrance to Bridge of Tilt

- Location within Perth and Kinross
- OS grid reference: NN878654
- Council area: Perth and Kinross
- Lieutenancy area: Perth and Kinross
- Country: Scotland
- Sovereign state: United Kingdom
- Post town: PITLOCHRY
- Postcode district: PH18
- Police: Scotland
- Fire: Scottish
- Ambulance: Scottish
- Scottish Parliament: North Tayside; North East Scotland

Bridge of Tilt (Scottish Gaelic: Drochaid Theilt) is a village in Perthshire, Scotland, built around the River Tilt (Scottish Gaelic: Abhainn Teilt), near its confluence with the River Garry. It is 5 3/4 miles (9.3 kilometres) northwest of Pitlochry. The newer part of the village is continuous with Blair Atholl, only separated by the River Tilt. The village is located primarily on the B8079 between Pitlochry and Dunalastair Water, but the older part of the village (Old Bridge of Tilt) is located further up the River Tilt. The A9 runs past the River Garry to the south of Bridge of Tilt, and connects the village with Newtonmore and Inverness in the north and Pitlochry, Perth and Stirling in the south.

== Kilmaveonaig Church ==
The church lies to the north of the village in relative isolation. It is dedicated to St Eonaig, but is first mentioned in the 7th century when St Adamnan preached here. In 1591 it was rebuilt and enlarged by Roberton of Lude. In 1688 it was one of four churches serving the Blair Atholl area. By 1700 it was formally adopted as the official Episcopalian church for the area, by the Episcopalian Laird of Lude. It was further rebuilt in 1794 then again 1866/71.

The church bell is dated 1629. The reredos is by Sir Robert Lorimer and dates from 1912.

== Transport and amenities ==
Bridge of Tilt is located very near to Blair Castle, home of the Clan Murray, who hold the title of Duke of Atholl. The village has two hotels, Ptarmigan House (which offers fishing, shooting and golf) and the Bridge of Tilt Hotel, which is located on the main road. There is also a caravan park, River Tilt Park. There are few shops within the new village, but there is a restaurant, 'The Loft' and a local grocery, the 'Tilt Stores'. Blair Atholl Primary School is located on St Adamnan Road in Bridge of Tilt.

Buses stop outside the Bridge of Tilt Hotel and offer services to Pitlochry, Calvine and Struan. Although the village has no railway station, Blair Atholl railway station has services every two hours to Inverness and Perth, and the daily Highland Chieftain operates between Inverness and London King's Cross railway station.

== Geography ==
Geographically, Bridge of Tilt sits on the north bank of the River Garry. To the west of the village on the main road is the bridge over the River Tilt, and this separates the village from Blair Atholl. The village is located in a valley in the Grampians, and south of the valley is Tulach Hill (1,542 feet or 470 metres), and to the northeast is Càrn Liath (3,192 feet or 973 metres). Despite its location, it sits in a reasonably populated area of the Grampian Mountains, with the villages of Calvine, Struan, Pitagowan, Bruar, Aldclune and Killiecrankie all within 4 miles (6 kilometres) of the village, as well as Blair Atholl.

== See also ==
- Blair Atholl
- Blair Atholl railway station
- Blair Castle
- A9 road
- Perthshire
- Grampians
- Scottish Gaelic
