= Operation Lightning Strike =

Operation Lightning Strike can refer to:

- Operation Lightning Strike, a 2000 book sequel to 1999 novel Operation Thunder Child by Nick Pope
- Operation Lightning Strike, a 2015 Lithuanian army training exercise
