= Calvine UFO photograph =

Purported sighting of a UFO in Calvine, 1990

Calvine UFO Sighting
- The only surviving original photograph of the Calvine UFO

- Location within Perth and Kinross
- Date: 4 August 1990
- Location: Calvine, Perth and Kinross, Scotland; 56.768°N 3.958°W (nearest settlement)
- Type: UFO sighting
- First reporter: Daily Record
- Photographer: Kevin Russell

The Calvine UFO (also known as the Calvine Sighting) was a reported sighting of an unidentified flying object (UFO) near the hamlet of Calvine in Perthshire, Scotland in August 1990.

The sighting was originally reported to the Daily Record, a Glasgow-based tabloid newspaper, by two men who claimed that they witnessed an unknown diamond-shaped craft while walking on the moors above Calvine on the evening of 4 August 1990. They reported seeking shelter under some nearby trees from where they watched the craft, taking photographs while it hovered silently above before ascending vertically and disappearing from view.

The two witnesses later told their story to the Daily Record and handed over their prints and original negatives, which were later passed on to the Ministry of Defence (MOD). The original negatives and prints subsequently disappeared and the story was never published by the Daily Record. The identity of the witnesses remains unknown despite efforts to locate them by a team of researchers led by investigative journalist David Clarke.

In the following years, reports of the sighting and rumours of the photograph gradually surfaced, and the case slowly gained public interest. Partial documentation included in Ministry of Defence documents released by The National Archives in 2009 helped provide further insight into the sighting and attracted more attention. This ultimately led to the discovery of an original photographic image of the UFO by Clarke, which was subsequently published in the British-based tabloid newspaper the Daily Mail on Saturday 13 August 2022, with an online release the night before. The publication of the image led to significant media coverage which has been maintained through subsequent stories, with news outlets leading their coverage with often sensational headlines describing the Calvine photograph as "the best UFO picture ever" (2022), the "best ever photo evidence" (2023), the "World's clearest UFO photo" (2024), and "the best UFO photograph ever seen" (2025).

== Historical background ==
The existence of the Calvine photographs was first reported by former Ministry of Defence desk officer Nick Pope in his 1996 book Open Skies, Closed Minds based on his experiences logging UFO sightings reported to the MOD while assigned to Sec(AS)2 on what was known as ‘the UFO desk’, from 1991 to 1994.

In the book, Pope briefly describes the Calvine sighting, which took place a year before he arrived at Sec(AS)2, as "one of the most intriguing in the Ministry of Defence's files". He explains how two men out walking above Calvine became aware of a low humming sound and turned to see a large diamond-shaped object in the sky. The object hovered for about ten minutes, during which time one of the men captured six photographs, before flying off vertically at great speed. During the sighting a jet, identified by the MOD as a Harrier, made several low-level passes "as if the pilot had seen the object as well and was homing in for a closer look". Pope explained that expert analysis undertaken by the MOD had concluded the photos were "not fakes" and the sighting was marked as "object unexplained, case closed, no further action". He also explained that there had been a poster-sized version of one of the original photographs on his office wall until it was removed by his Head of Division.

In an April 2001 interview with David Clarke, Pope claimed that MOD analysts allegedly determined the object to be a "solid craft", at least the size of a Harrier or Hawk fighter jet. According to him, the MOD reportedly concluded that there were no indications the images were a hoax, that "this was for real, that it was a good one".

Sean Kirkpatrick, former director of the United States Department of Defense's All-domain Anomaly Resolution Office, has been quoted as concluding that it is a reflection in the lake and the photo has been doctored: "If you look carefully towards the right side and in the raw image, the top and bottom are reflections of each other.” Others, who assert that the photo is a hoax, claim that the supposed UFO could merely be something akin to "a cardboard bauble attached to a string and hung from a tree branch".

== Release of MOD files ==
Despite Pope's description of the Calvine sighting in Open Skies, Closed Minds, it gained little public attention until 2008, when the National Archive began to release the MoD's UFO reports as part of the 'open government' initiative. Clarke, who was known for his investigation of UFO reports, was invited to supervise the release and publication of the UFO files.

One of two poor quality photocopies of 'VuFoils' (images on transparent plastic) made from the Calvine UFO Photograph, released by the UK National Archives in 2009

Among the released documents were materials related to the Calvine sighting, including a government briefing from the MoD Secretariat Air Staff, and a handwritten summary of the sighting from a Sec(AS)2 officer both dated September 1990 (DEFE 24/1940/1 – pages 113–116). Additionally, two poor-quality photocopies of Vu-Foils (images on transparent plastic) made from cropped versions of the original photographs were included in records assembled by DI55, a branch of the Directorate of Scientific and Technical Intelligence (DSTI) that dealt with missiles and air defence. (DEFE 31/180/1 – pages 36–7). These files revealed the images were the subject of an investigation by DI55 and a RAF photo analyst agency.

Clarke later wrote The UFO Files, which explored various UFO sightings documented in the MoD archives, including the Calvine incident. The released documents on the Calvine UFO were publicised through Clarke's blog.

== 2015 Channel 5 documentary ==
The release of information from the National Archives, along with publicity from Clarke and Pope, led to increasing public interest in the case, especially within the U.K. and in 2015, the incident was featured in the sixth episode of the Channel 5 documentary series Conspiracy.

The episode, titled "Alien Cover-Up", included interviews with Clarke and Pope and featured a reconstruction of the sighting filmed on the moors above Calvine. For the programme Pope worked with a graphic artist to recreate the Calvine photograph based on his recollection of the image and the photocopies from the UK National Archives. This reconstructed image was later republished in various media outlets, including HuffPost, being mistaken by some for a genuine image of the sighting. Pope has since discussed the incident, speculating on potential links to the alleged Aurora project.

== Discovery of the Calvine photograph ==
In 2018, Clarke renewed his investigation into the sighting, seeking to locate both the missing photographs and the witnesses. His interest was sparked by a Defence Intelligence officer's claim that the witnesses had photographed a classified U.S. black project platform that to this day remains Top Secret. This source suggested the platform had been flown from RAF Machrihanish, escorted by U.K. and U.S. aircraft, and the photos had been carefully kept out of the public domain.

Clarke and a small team of researchers, including Vinnie Adams, Matthew Illsley, and Giles Stevens, worked to uncover further details of the Calvine sighting undertaking interviews with former MoD staff; conducting public searches; and publishing updates throughout 2020 and 2021. In 2020, the Scottish ufologist Straiph Wilson launched a search via a local newspaper for the witnesses; however, no one came forward.

Redacted version of a handwritten summary of the Calvine sighting from September 1990, released by the UK National Archives in 2009.

A handwritten summary of the Calvine incident released by the MOD in 2009 (TNA DEFE 24/1940/1 – page 113) briefly mentioned that a report of the sighting had been passed to "RAF Press Officer, Pitreavie MHQ", however the name and phone number of the person concerned had been redacted. Clarke was able to track down the person in the post at the time; retired RAF Press Officer Craig Lindsay, who he first contacted in August 2021. In their first phone call Lindsay told Clarke: “I’ve been waiting for someone to call me about this for 30 years!" Over the course of a number of interviews, Lindsay revealed that the Daily Record had provided him with a print of one of the images along with contact details for one of the witnesses. Lindsay had phoned the witness, who turned out to be working in a hotel in Pitlochry, and interviewed them over the phone. He then typed up a short report of his findings which he faxed, along with a photocopy of the image provided by the Daily Record, to the MOD in London at which point he was told to 'leave it to London'.

In October 2021 Lindsay emailed Clarke a copy of a photocopy of the original photograph sent to him by the Daily Record but told him he couldn't find the print itself. The following May, Clarke travelled to Calvine to interview Lindsay in person at which time he revealed the original photograph along with its envelope and the photocopies he had faxed to the MOD, all of which he had safely kept in his possession for over 32 years. Lindsay would not allow Clarke to handle the print as he didn't want to reveal a name written on its rear however agreed to be photographed with it. The resulting image which Clarke later shared via his blog was the first time that this, the only surviving photograph of the Calvine sighting had been reproduced since Lindsay acquired it in 1990. In the photograph Lindsay appears slightly ill at ease, carefully holding the original print against a piece of cardboard so as not to reveal the name on the reverse which he wished to keep secret.

On 27 June 2022, Clarke and Vinnie Adams interviewed Lindsay at RAF Pitreavie Castle at which point he agreed to donate the print and other items to Sheffield Hallam University's Special Collection and handed them over to Clarke.

Upon his return Clarke immediately took the image to a photographic specialist at the university, Andrew Robinson, who produced high-resolution digital copies and conducted an in-depth analysis of the original image and other materials resulting in a detailed report, prior to the materials being added to the university's collection. An extended report including additional information and analysis was published online in 2024. Robinson's analysis concludes that the photograph is genuine and that "as far as can be determined the image itself is a genuine photograph of a scene before the camera". Whilst not ruling out the possibility of staging in front of the camera, as has been suggested by some commentators, he finds no evidence of this.

The photograph, Lindsay's eyewitness account, and the results of Robinson's analysis were first made public via a post on David Clarke's website. The publication of the image sparked worldwide interest in the Calvine story resulting in the photograph and Lindsay's eyewitness account being republished by numerous news outlets prompting much speculation and debate on social media between those who believed this to be a hoax; evidence of alien life; or a secret military aircraft. Clarke and his research team later discussed their discovery in an online Q&A on the UFO podcast 'The Disclosure Team'. Clarke was told by a Ministry of Defence officer that people at the Ministry knew the object was "an experimental craft belonging to the US."

== The search for Kevin Russell ==
On the reverse of the original Calvine photograph, in red chinagraph (used by photographers at the time to mark up contact sheets) is a handwritten credit which reads "Copyright Kevin Russell c/o the Daily Record, Glasgow". This was present when Lindsay received the print from the Daily Record and he believed it to be the name of one of the witnesses. Clarke contacted the Daily Record and was told that no-one by that name had ever worked there as a staff or freelance photographer and they had no knowledge as to why the name might be on the rear of the image. Clarke's team then carried out an intensive search contacting more than 400 people by that name worldwide in an attempt to track down a Kevin Russell who might have worked in a hotel in Pitlochry at the time of the sighting. A photograph of someone known by that name, who worked as a kitchen porter at a hotel in Pitlochry in the summer of 1990 was provided by a former co-worker and first published in the Daily Record in March 2023. However, when the person identified was finally tracked down in 2024 he denied any knowledge of the UFO. In an interview for The Guardian story published in February 2025, Nick Pope, who had access to the Calvine files during his time at the MoD, acknowledges he is aware of the name Kevin Russell; however, he refused to comment on this or any of the names that have been linked to the story. He explains the fact that the photographer has not come forward by suggesting that “at the very least... a fairly robust conversation was held”; however, Pope goes on to dismiss conspiratorial suggestions that the witnesses might have been disappeared or "assassinated by the deep state" as "pure nonsense". Despite widespread coverage of the search in the media, no one has yet come forward and Clarke's research team were unable to identify anyone else by the name Kevin Russell who might have been one of the witnesses.

== The Program documentary (2024) ==
The Program is a documentary by American film-maker James Fox released on Apple TV and Amazon Prime on 16 December 2024. The Calvine UFO is featured as one of a number of famous UFO cases including Socorro, New Mexico (1964), Colares, Brazil (1977), and Voronezh, Soviet Union (1989) and the Calvine photograph briefly appears in the trailer for the film. and has been used in other advertising materials.

The film explores the U.S. congressional effort to uncover government knowledge about UFOs and UAPs and includes an in-depth review of the Calvine case which Fox considers "the most compelling photographic case in (UFO) history".

For the documentary, Fox travelled to the U.K. to interview David Clarke and Robinson in Sheffield where he was able to view the original Calvine photograph, before traveling to Scotland to undertake the first ever on-camera interview with Lindsay and to visit Calvine. Filming took place at An Teampan, the hillside above Calvine that Clarke's team had identified as the most likely location for the sighting. Pope also provides a detailed account of his knowledge of the sighting from his time as the UFO desk officer between 1991 and 1994.

== See also ==
- UFO conspiracy theory
- List of reported UFO sightings
- UFO sightings in United Kingdom
