= UFO sightings in the United Kingdom =

List of alleged UFO sightings within the United Kingdom

This is a list of notable alleged sightings of unidentified flying objects (UFOs) in the United Kingdom. Many more sightings have become known since the gradual release, between 2008 and 2013, of the Ministry of Defence's UFO sighting reports by the National Archives. In recent years, there have been reports of many slowly moving lights in the night sky, which can be easily explained as Chinese lanterns. Undertaken between 1997 and 2000, Project Condign concluded that all the investigated sightings of unidentified aerial phenomena in the UK could be attributed to misidentified but explicable objects, or poorly understood natural phenomena. London is the city with the most UFO sightings in the UK, followed by Manchester and Birmingham.

== 12th century ==
- 1113: Religious pilgrims in South West England reported seeing a glowing fire-belching "dragon" emerge from the sea, flying into the air, and disappearing into the sky.

== 13th century ==
- January 1254: In St Albans, England, a scribe wrote of a glowing floating light, thus recorded it, "...in serene sky and clear air, with stars shining and the Moon eight days old, there suddenly appeared in the sky a kind of large ship elegantly shaped, well equipped and of marvellous colour."
- 1290: Friars of Byland Abbey, described "a flat, round shining silvery object" flying overhead of them. However, this report is a hoax perpetrated by two teenagers in the 1950s.

== 20th century ==
=== 1900s ===
- 11 May 1909: sightings, from early May 1909, of a mystery airship appeared over Ipswich, Cardiff, and Dublin. It had two visible lights, and would fly at around 01:00 in the morning. It was seen to travel at a "rapid rate", most unlike conventional airships. It acquired the name "scareship" or "phantom airship". In one night, the same type of craft was seen in Ipswich and Cardiff.
- 19 May 1909: at midnight, a "scareship" was seen over Tharston in south Norfolk, by grocer's assistant Mr Chatten who worked at J.A. Lammas, cycling home. It was 400 ft long, rapidly moving towards Norwich. He could not hear any motor. On the same day, another was seen at Wroxham in Norfolk. The Willows airships were the first British airships. One had been built by 1909, with a 7 hp engine, built by Ernest Willows of Wales. An airship first crossed the English Channel on 4 November 1910, the Willows No. 3. German Zeppelins were most unlikely to have reached Cardiff, in 1909. The Zeppelins could not travel at a "rapid rate", being underpowered. Large inertia, of a possible object, would infer unremarkable acceleration. In 1909 "mystery airships" were also seen in Australia, on 16 July 1909, also with a light on the front and back, and in Sweden.

=== 1910s ===
- Late 1912: the "scareships" returned. On 14 October 1912, a "scareship" appeared over Kent. In parliament on 27 November 1912 Conservative MP William Joynson-Hicks, 1st Viscount Brentford asked Winston Churchill if Britain had "any airship capable of travelling at the rate of sixty miles an hour". Zeppelin airships had only reached the UK in 1914.

=== 1940s ===
- February 1942: A woman named Eileen Arnold was walking down Cheltenham High Street when she suddenly experienced an altered state of consciousness as she became "tuned into another reality". She became aware of a large oval shape moving slowly above the rooftops. She stated that it radiated light from holes in its side and had quills which detached one by one, also emitting light. Following the encounter, Eileen believed she had numerous psychic experiences.
- September 1942: Albert Lancaster believed he was abducted by aliens while working as a guard at a radar site near Newbiggin-by-the-Sea, Northumberland. He claimed to have a sudden urge to go outside, followed by a "strange impulse to look at the sky." He claims he saw a glowing light surrounded by dark mist and, assuming it to be a German weapon, went to raise the alarm before being struck by a beam of light from the cloud, followed by a floating sensation, then becoming aware he was back at his post. After this experience, he believed he had psychic powers for a period of time.
- 5 August 1944: According to records released on 5 August 2010, British wartime PM Winston Churchill banned the reporting, for fifty years, of an alleged UFO incident because of concerns that it could create mass panic. Reports given to Churchill claimed the incident involved a Royal Air Force (RAF) reconnaissance plane returning from a mission in France or Germany. Allegedly, when flying over or near the English coastline, the aircraft was suddenly intercepted by a strange metallic object that matched its course and speed for a time before accelerating away and disappearing. The plane's crew were reported to have photographed the object, which they said had "hovered noiselessly" near the aircraft, before moving off. According to the documents, details of the cover-up emerged when a man wrote to the government in 1999 seeking to find out more about the incident. He described how his grandfather, who served with the RAF in the Second World War, was present when Churchill and U.S. General Dwight Eisenhower discussed how to deal with the UFO encounter. The files come from more than 5,000 pages of UFO reports, letters, and drawings from members of the public, as well as questions raised by Members of the UK Parliament. They are available to download for free for a month from The National Archives website.

=== 1950s ===
- 1 June 1950 — A Gloster Meteor at RAF Tangmere passes a flying saucer lit up with lights, described as "Britain's first flying saucer". The object was reported to be "shining, revolving, and disc-like" at 20,000 ft at 14:30, flying eastwards over the Portsmouth area. RAF Tangmere asked the radar station at RAF Wartling in Sussex if it had seen the object, and it had on its PPI screen. It led to the setting up of the Flying Saucer Working Party.
- 14 August 1950 — A disc UFO 50 feet in diameter is seen over the Royal Aircraft Establishment (RAE) at 11:27 by an experienced pilot F/Lt Hubbard. He claimed to see another similar object on 5 September 1950 at 16:09.
- 26 August 1950 — In the early hours of the morning a 20-year-old woman was walking back to her home in the village of Stanton Drew, Somerset, from a party when she decided to take a shortcut through a field near to the stone circles whereupon she heard a buzzing sound, she turned to her left and noticed a bright saucer-shaped object hovering over the next field. A door on the craft began to open and she screamed, started to run and did not stop until she got home.
- 14–25 September 1952 — Exercise Mainbrace. On 19 September at 10:53, a silver disc-shaped object followed a Gloster Meteor returning to RAF Topcliffe and was seen by observers on the ground. It rotated whilst hovering. It then travelled towards the west at high speed. On 21 September, six RAF planes followed a spherical object over the North Sea. It followed one of the planes back to the base. It was the front-page headline on 20 September 1952 on the Yorkshire Evening Press and on 21 September 1952 on the Sunday Dispatch, and was reported by 31-year-old Shackleton pilot Flt Lt John Kilburn of 269 Squadron, from Thornhill, Cumberland. It was discussed in parliament on 2 February 1959 by Labour MP Roy Mason, later the Secretary of State for Defence from 1974-76
- 21 October 1952 — Two RAF pilots in a Gloster Meteor saw three disc-shaped objects at 35,000 feet in the Little Rissington UFO incident.
- 9 October 1953 — Two BEA pilots flying from London to Paris see a saucer object over the English Channel for thirty minutes in a Airspeed Ambassador (Elizabethan); former RAF pilot Captain Peter Fletcher, of Putney, and First Officer R. L. Lemon, of Iver in Buckinghamshire, had taken off at 09:00 from London Airport
- 3 November 1953 — Terry Johnson and Geoffrey Smythe in an RAF de Havilland Vampire saw a UFO over RAF West Malling. It was discussed in parliament on 24 November 1953 by the Conservative Rochdale MP Lt-Col Wentworth Schofield, where the Conservative Secretary of State for Air, Nigel Birch, Baron Rhyl, said that the sighting was merely "a weather balloon", and was discussed again on 25 November 1953 by the Labour Northampton MP, Reginald Paget, Baron Paget of Northampton
- 29 June 1954 — A BOAC pilot in a Boeing 377 Stratocruiser sees seven UFOs when travelling back from New York to London over the North Atlantic; in G-ALSC Boeing 377-10-28 (sold to Transocean Air Lines in January 1959) RMA Centaurus; the aircraft left New York Idlewild Airport at 17:03 on Flight 510-196 heading for refuelling at CFB Goose Bay, where the pilot saw seven UFOs four hours later near Newfoundland for eighteen minutes at 19,000 ft from 01:05 GMT to 01:23 GMT; Captain James Howard, aged 33 from Bristol, was a former RAF Bomber Command Squadron Leader on his 265th crossing of the Atlantic, and he was interviewed on 3 July 1954 for the BBC In Town Tonight with air hostess 28-year-old Daphne Webster of Hounslow, and the Canadian First Officer Lee Boyd, the co-pilot, who flew in the Pathfinder Force in World War II and was shown on Thursday 9 May 1968 on BBC1 "Flying Saucers and the people who see them", with Stephen Black, and the two Devon policemen from October 1967, and the programme discussed the 1968 Condon Committee report of the University of Colorado and was mentioned in the House of Lords on Thursday 18 January 1979 by Brinsley Trench, 8th Earl of Clancarty.
- 14 October 1954 — F/Lt James Salandin of the Royal Auxiliary Air Force, flying in a No. 604 Squadron RAF Gloster Meteor F8 from RAF North Weald, narrowly missed two UFOs over Southend-on-Sea at around 16:30 at 16,000 ft. The objects were circular with one being coloured silver and the other gold. He narrowly avoided having a head-on collision with the silver object.
- 17 July 1955 — At noon on King Harold's Way in Bexleyheath in the London Borough of Bexley a 30-foot-wide saucer-shaped object was seen to hover a few feet above a street in broad daylight by Margaret Fry and her doctor on a very hot cloudless day. Car engines nearby to the object stalled. It was seen by around thirty people and made a humming noise and landed at the junction of Ashbourne Road and Whitfield Road. It hovered over Bedonwell Primary School (now Bedonwell Junior School) for around one minute. It finally shot off into the sky. Another UFO had landed a few streets away at the same time. A similar object had been seen in Bexleyheath in 1952.

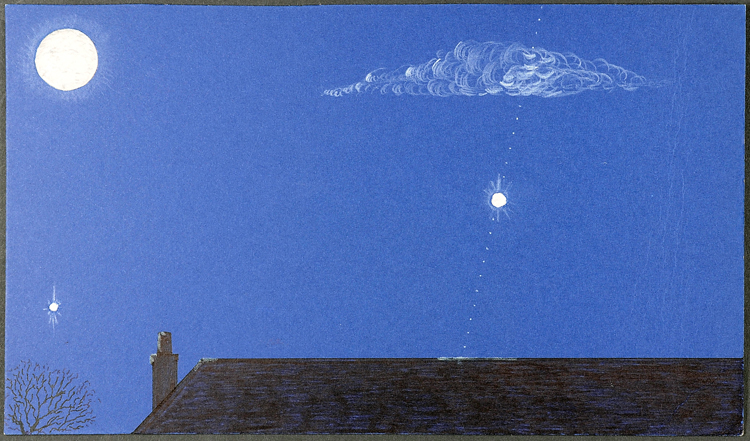
National Archives sketch of a UFO seen near Birmingham on 18 January 1975, later identified as satellites Zond 4 and Kosmos 460

- 13 August 1956 — Lakenheath-Bentwaters incident — 12 to 15 objects were picked up by USAF radar over East Anglia at 12:00. One object was tracked at more than 4,000 mph by USAF GCA radar at RAF Bentwaters. The objects sometimes travelled in formation, then converged to form a larger object and performed sharp turns. One object was tracked for 26 miles (41.8 kilometres) which then hovered for five minutes then flew off. One object at 22:00 was tracked at 12,000 mph. RAF de Havilland Venoms from RAF Waterbeach had sightings of the objects.
- 22 September 1956 — a large, spherical glass-like 80-foot-diameter object was seen over the Cleethorpes coast for over an hour and also seen on radar from RAF Manby at 15:00. RAF planes approached the object and it flew off.
- 4 April 1957 — West Freugh incident — a large object was seen on radar at MOD West Freugh near Stranraer at 50,000 ft which was stationary for 10 minutes over the Irish Sea. It moved vertically to 70,000 ft and was also tracked by radar at Ardwell. The object made an "impossible" sharp turn and was described as being as large as a ship, bigger than a normal aircraft.
- 29 April 1957 — at 20:50, an unknown object, heading west, was tracked by radar at 1,000 mph over the English Channel, around Dover. It was discussed in Parliament on 15 May 1957 by Conservative MP Patrick Wall and Labour MP Frank Beswick, a former wartime RAF pilot. George Ward, 1st Viscount Ward of Witley, the Secretary of State for Air, claimed that the sighting was probably two squadrons of (transonic) Hawker Hunters, capable of no more than 715 mph at sea level.

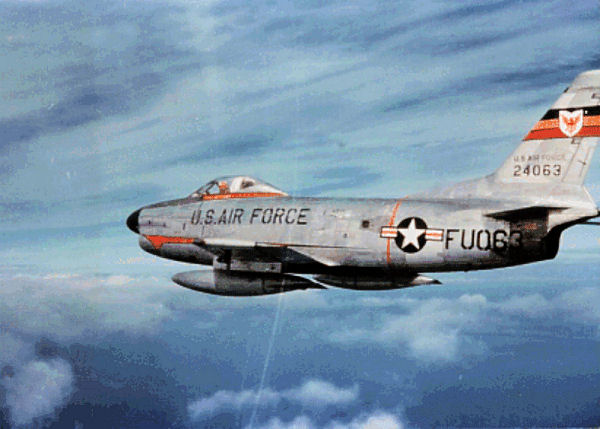
F-86 Sabre of the 406th Fighter Bomber Group

- 20 May 1957 — Milton Torres 1957 UFO Encounter — a USAF F-86D Sabre based at RAF Manston, of the 406th Fighter Bomber Group, intercepted an object over East Anglia.
- 21 November 1957 — Silpho Moor UFO — a small 18-inch saucer-shaped container was discovered containing copper pages with messages in glyphs. The remains were discovered in a science museum 60 years later.

=== 1960s ===
- Friday 9 February 1962: at 03:30, having driven through Dunstable, a 35 year old Luton motor mechanic approached the crossroads at the end of Ivinghoe Road at Aston Clinton, and saw an object, with a haze around the object, similar to a halo sometimes seen around the Moon. Ron Wildman, of 42 St Margaret's Avenue in Luton, who worked for Car Collection Company of Luton, was driving a new estate car from the Vauxhall plant to Swansea. There were black indentations, at regular intervals, along the object, which were possibly port holes or air vents, as seen from the reflection of his headlights. The object disabled Mr Wildman's car engine, being oval-shaped and glowing white. The object moved off at a high speed, to Aylesbury, and at that moment the power came back to his car. The unknown craft dislodged frost from the tree tops, which landed on his windscreen; this was not his imagination. The object was 40 ft wide, and 20 ft above the ground. He went to Aylesbury police station, where the police calmed his nerves with a cup of coffee for twenty minutes. The two policemen he met, at first, did not believe him, but after an hour of interrogation, they began to see that he was not likely to be inventing his story. He continued his previous journey to Swansea. His wife said, "He's not the imaginative type."
- Monday 21 May 1962: Aer Lingus pilot Gordon Pendleton (former RAF, joined Aer Lingus from 1952 - 7 April 1988) piloted a Viscount (called St Colmcille EI-AKL) from Cork to Brussels at 17,000ft and sees a moving object (600-700 mph) with no wings and antenna-like projections that he cannot identify over Taunton in Somerset, co-pilot Peter Murphy.
- From late spring (19 May) to early summer 1965: There were many sightings of UFOs in the Warminster area. Cley Hill, near to the town, has since been a place for frequent sightings.

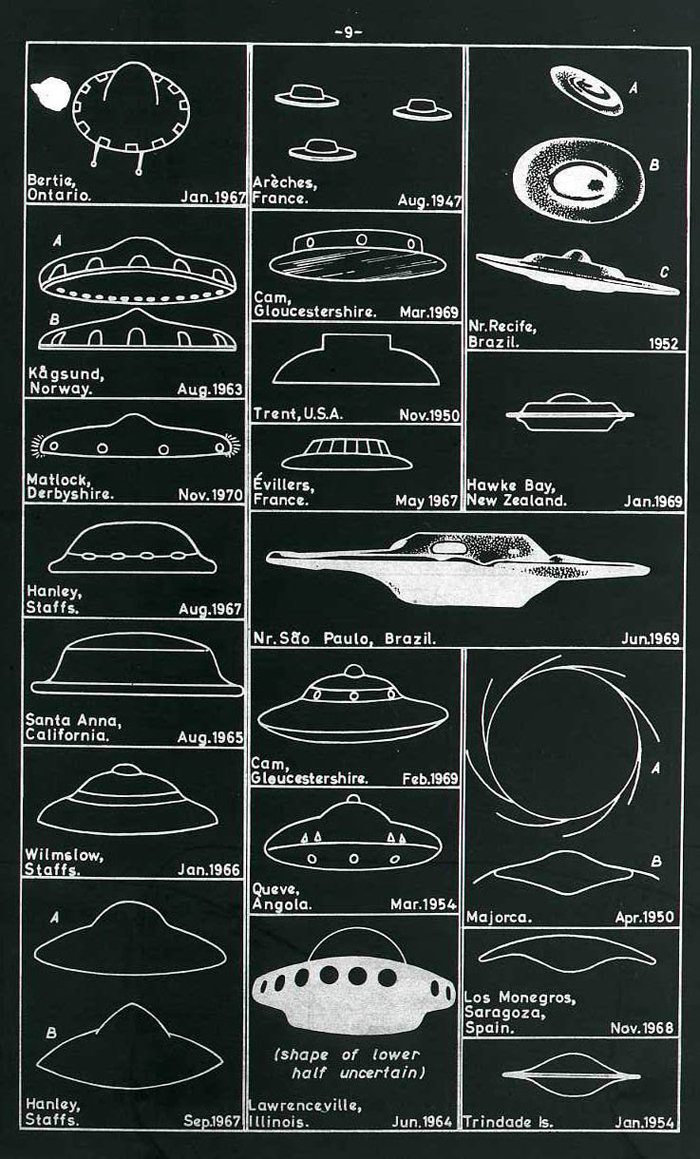
Worldwide sightings of unidentified craft, including some from the UK (from the UK National Archives)

- June 1965: Cigar-shaped metallic object remained stationary for half hour over Heytesbury, near Warminster. Witnessed by vicar, wife and 3 children. Featured in book The Warminster Mystery by reporter Arthur Shuttlewood
- 28 April 1967: For approximately one hour around 12:00, a dome-shaped object was sighted at about 1,600 ft over Brixham in Devon. A door was seen in the side of the object and it had been spotted by the HM Coastguard station at Berry Head. There were 362 UFO sightings in 1967; there had only been 95 in 1966.
- 1967: Clapham Wood in West Sussex experienced a rash of UFO sightings and unexplained events during the 1960s and continuing into the 1970s.
- 10 August 1967: at 00:43, on Liverpool Road in Hindley, the policemen 30 year old Lionel Haw and 20 year old Steve Parsonage saw a large white object
- 2 September 1967: object seen over Stoke-on-Trent
- 24 October 1967: "Devon Flying Cross UFO" – At 04:00, Police Constables Roger Willey and Clifford Waycott, aged 33, were driving from Holsworthy to Hatherleigh along the A3072. They saw a bright object in the shape of a cross at tree-top height about 40 metres away. They followed the "pulsating" object for about fifteen minutes along the road at speeds of up to 80 mph. The object was described as being star-spangled like "looking through wet glass". It was joined by a second object at 04:23. A motorist in a Land Rover, Mr Christopher Garner of Hatherleigh, aged 29, had also seen it and thought he was having a nightmare. The object disappeared at around 05:00, having been pursued for fourteen miles. It was attributed to the planet Venus, as were other similar sightings that same month. It had also been seen by two BBC engineers at North Hessary Tor transmitting station, Peter Walker and Peter Crook, in the Tavistock area. The sighting was discussed in parliament on 8 November 1967 by Conservative MPs Peter Mills, and Sir John Langford-Holt, a former RAF Battle of Britain fighter pilot, and by Labour MP Alan Lee Williams. Minister of State for Transport Merlyn Rees said that it was "probably the planet Venus", and "nothing leads us to believe that this is men from Mars". But Peter Mills remained sceptical, adding that two police officers had seen the object "moving for over an hour".
- 25 October 1967: "Sussex Flying Cross" – Policemen in five police cars across East Sussex reported a bright flying cross in the early hours, with the first sighting at 4:45 at Halland, and also seen by 56 year old Wing Commander Eric Cox of Hyde when driving from Cadnam to Fordingbridge, in south Hampshire, at 23:05, being described as a "fiery cross". The other sightings were a few minutes later, and also seen in Wales.
- 26 October 1967: 54-year-old Mr Angus Brooks, a former BOAC administrator from Owermoigne in Dorset, was walking at 11:25 on Moigns Down near Holworth, close to the Dorset coast with his two dogs in a force 8 gale and took shelter in a hollow. He then saw a circular translucent craft with a "girder" at the front and three pointing to the rear. The "girders" rearranged to form a cross shape around the central 25 ft-diameter disc and then began to spin. Twenty-two minutes later, the "girders" returned to their original position and the craft sped off in a northeast direction.

=== 1970s ===
- 25 January 1971: during October 1970, Pat Otter, the assistant editor of the Grimsby Evening Telegraph, had claimed that many Quick Reaction Alert RAF aircraft were sent up to investigate mysterious objects over the North Sea, culminating in many aircraft being despatched in late January 1971, to investigate a whole series of unknown objects, with eighteen of these flying up to 87,000 ft at 4,700 mph. The local area was investigated by the American Sightings in early August 1994, a television series made by Paramount Pictures
- 1971: It is claimed that unidentified silent craft were regularly seen by two school children near the coastal village of Muchalls, Scotland, but not in the village itself, from 1971 onwards. These events are alleged to have reoccurred night after night for many years, and are reputed to have continued until at least 1991 when some aspects of the apparitions were also filmed in the area.
- 25 May 1971: at 22:50 at Belcher's Bar in western Leicestershire, 36 year old Eunice Rose, of Welwyn Road in Hinckley, was driving a 1956 Austin A30. She saw a glowing object ahead, in the Ibstock direction, moving towards Odstone. She turned right towards Hinckley on to the A447. The object passed over the car, and caused the headlights to dim, lowered the power of the engine, and the car radio stopped abruptly. She had visited friends in Odstone. The object was a flat circular disc, that bathed the countryside in light. It was also seen by 11 year old Terry Evans.
- 12 August 1971: at 23:00, a silent cylindrical object was seen over a field by 31 year old Mrs Olwyn Grainger from Wombourne, of the 1st Netherton guide group. Also present was Miss Lottie Hare, the Dudley guide commissioner, and 37 year old Mrs Betty McGowan. The object was 30 to 40 feet long. Around 50 yards away, in the next field, it stayed hovering silently, for over an hour. The object had red and green lights, which all aircraft have. The British music group Henry Cow wrote a suite titled Guider Tells of Silent Airborne Machine in 1973, which appeared on a John Peel Session on 24 April 1973. Each of the three songs was named after each guide leader. The songs appeared on the 2009 album The 40th Anniversary Henry Cow Box Set.

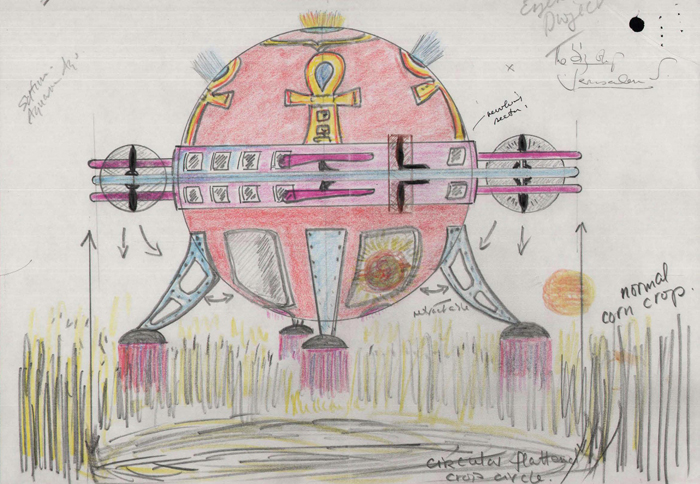
National Archives sketch in 1998 of a UFO over a field, sent to Kerry Philpott at Secretariat (Air Staff) 2A

- 16 October 1973: at 23:15, it is alleged that a 33-year-old woman ("Gabriella Versacci") was taken on board an alien space ship for three hours, near a small village in Somerset, England, on the B3187. She was physically inspected after being strapped to an examination table, and reported the abduction four years later.
- 23 January 1974: A UFO allegedly crashed on the Berwyn Mountains in Wales. The event coincided with an earthquake.
- 4 February 1977: A cigar-shaped craft is alleged to have landed next to Broad Haven Primary School and witnessed by 14 school children who saw a silver creature. The headteacher Ralph Llewellyn interviewed fifteen children on Monday 7 February 1977, who all make similar drawings
- Wednesday 16 February 1977: at Rhosybol in Anglesey in north Wales, when nine girls, who were playing netball with teacher Mrs Mair Williams, see a mysterious object, first seen by ten-year-old Gwawr Jones, and make similar drawings
- August 1977: A silver humanoid figure next to a spacecraft was seen in the middle of the road junction near Barnston, Merseyside.
- 22 November 1978: At 17:15, Elsie Oakensen of Church Stowe, Northamptonshire, was driving southwards down the A5 from Weedon Bec towards her home. She saw two bright lights, one green and one red, and could make out a dumbbell-shaped object. Turning off the A5 to her village, her recently serviced car cut out twice. She then noticed the sky was black and a brilliant white beam of light was shining on the road ahead, then the sky returned to its normal colour. After the experience, Elsie could not account for 15 minutes of her time.
- 12 December 1978: at 4.30am, Police Sgt Tony Dodd and PC Alan Dale, of North Yorkshire Police, near Cononley on the A629 saw a glowing object, which was illuminating the area 100ft ahead, being 100ft wide. It had a domed top with portholes, coloured lights on top, with three spheres on the underside, in a hollow section. The two policemen found it 'awe-inspiring' and 'beautiful'.
- 9 November 1979: Bob Taylor, a forestry worker, had an alleged encounter with a UFO in a clearing on Dechmont Law in Livingston, West Lothian. He claimed that the UFO had dragged him along the ground. This is considered to be one of the most significant close encounters in Scotland.

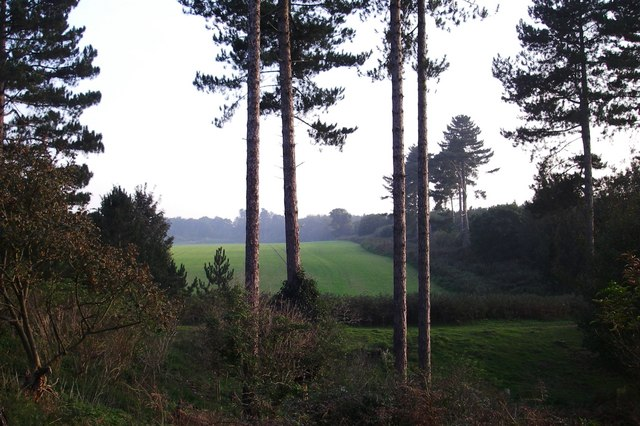
Rendlesham Forest site of UFO landing

=== 1980s ===
- 29 November 1980 at 5:00: police officer Alan Godfrey claims to have been abducted by an alien space craft in Todmorden in West Yorkshire. A strange luminescent object had been spotted by other local police officers at the same time, as well as the body of a man later identified as ZigmundAdamski, being found atop a pile of coal in the town of Todmorden, West Yorkshire.
- December 1980: A series of reported sightings of unexplained lights and objects in the sky, and the alleged landing of an extraterrestrial spacecraft occurred at Rendlesham Forest, Suffolk, England on 26 December. It is perhaps the most famous UFO event to have happened in Britain, ranking amongst the best-known UFO events worldwide.
- 28 November 1980: Police constable, Alan Godfrey, driving in a patrol car came across a diamond-shaped object hovering at 5 feet, blocking the road in West Yorkshire. He experiences missing time and possible abduction, However, The diamond shaped object that Godfrey reported seeing bears an uncanny resemblance to the Futuro House, Which was travelling through the town of Todmorden at the time.
- Tuesday 18 January 1983: multiple witnesses in south Wales saw "a large aircraft on its side" at 1,000ft with two large lights, being triangular, between 18:00 and 19:00, being seen in Swansea, Wenvoe, Fairwater, Cardiff and Llanrumney
- 12 August 1983: 77-year-old Alfred Burtoo, of 49 Pegasus Avenue, was quietly fishing on the Basingstoke Canal, near Government Bridge, when a UFO landed nearby in Aldershot. Two humanoid beings beckoned him onto their disc-shaped vehicle and he was medically examined by 4 ft English-speaking creatures, in a pale-green suit, with a dark visor. The object took off towards Tongham. He was "rejected" by the creatures, because he was "too old".
- 26 April 1984: Several people reported a UFO over Stanmore in north-west London, and was seen by two police officers.
- 13 October 1984: Several people see a flying saucer over Waterloo Bridge in London.UFO spotted over Waterloo Bridge
- 19 November 1987 at 19:00: a large UFO was seen at close quarters hovering over houses in Brierley Hill.

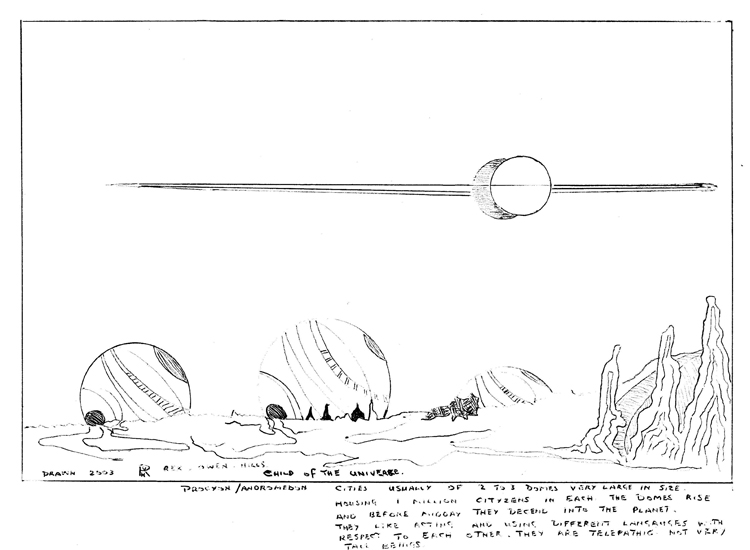
National Archives sketch of an alien planet landscape in January 2004

- 1 December 1987: Philip Spencer (pseudonym), a retired policeman, took a picture on Ilkley Moor, which is claimed to be of an alien creature, and then saw a white-coloured craft leaving the area. The object in the photograph was examined by Kodak Laboratories at Hemel Hempstead and they decided that the object was not superimposed. This was one of the few British close encounters of the third kind. Under hypnosis he claimed to have been abducted and medically examined.

=== 1990s–2000 ===
- 4 August 1990 at around 21:00: a diamond object estimated to be 100 feet wide was seen and photographed by two men near Calvine, Perth and Kinross, Scotland. It was reported as hovering silently in place for 10 minutes before rising rapidly into the sky. The sighting became known as The Calvine UFO and attracted world wide attention when a copy of one of the six original photographs which had been kept for more than 30 years by form RAF press officer Craig Lindsay, was discovered and published by Dr David Clarke. The photograph is considered by some as "the best UFO photograph" ever published
- 5 November 1990: a RAF Tornado returning from Germany, over the North Sea, encountered a strange object. It was discussed in parliament on 24 July 1996 by Labour MP Martin Redmond, who also discussed the March 1993 RAF Shawbury incident, and again on 12 November 1996 The 1998 BBC science-fiction television series Invasion: Earth had this November 1990 sighting over the North Sea as its premise for a storyline, filmed at an RAF Tornado base in northern Scotland. The series was filmed at RAF Lossiemouth in October 1997.
- 21 April 1991: airline pilot Achille Zaghetti from Grosseto, Tuscany, in an Alitalia McDonnell Douglas MD-80 on a flight from Milan to Heathrow saw a three-metre-long khaki-coloured object over Lydd in Kent at 22,000 ft about 300 m away. It was seen on radar.
- Wednesday 22 May 1991: At 23:30 many large objects were seen in the north of Nottingham and at Calverton
- 17 June 1991: a Dan Air Boeing 737 has a projectile pass under the aircraft, when climbing from Gatwick on a flight to Germany
- 15 July 1991: a Britannia Airways Boeing 737 from Crete encountered a black "lozenge" at 14,000 ft, as the aircraft approached Gatwick Airport. The object passed 30 ft above the Boeing 737's wing. The CAA said that it was "probably a weather balloon", but the Met Office said that weather balloons never ascended above 6,000 ft, and that the object was the wrong colour to be a weather balloon, which are an orange-red colour.

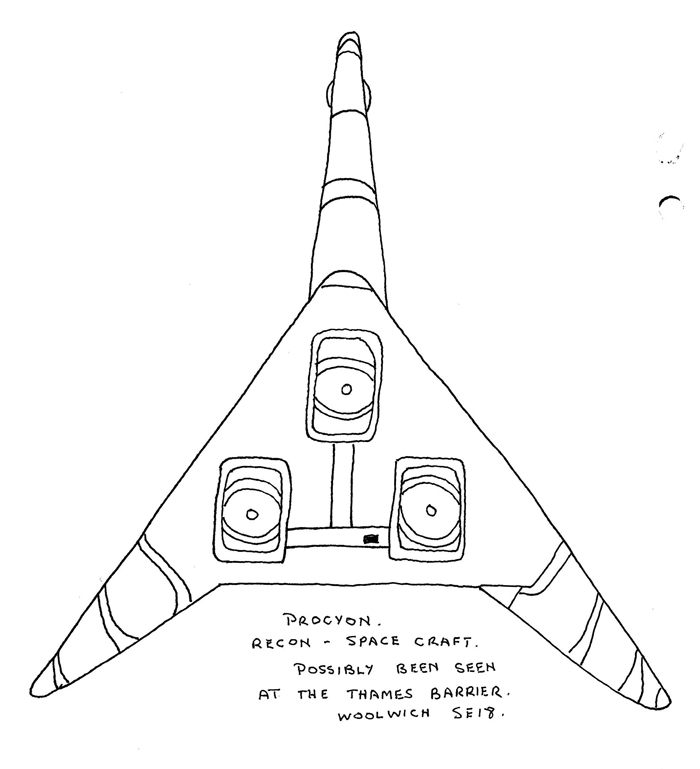
National Archives sketch of a UFO seen over Woolwich in September 2003

- January 1992: James Walker noticed unidentified lights in the sky, when driving from Dennyloanhead to Denny, Falkirk at 9pm, at Droves Loan junction, he saw a bright cluster of lights hovering above the road. Bonnybridge, the town became the scene of numerous UFO sightings. It forms part of the "Falkirk Triangle", an area stretching from Stirling to Fife and the outskirts of Edinburgh. Ufologists claim that Bonnybridge is the world's number one UFO location, with an average of around 300 sightings a year.
- March 1992: Isabella Sloggett, and her daughter Carol, were walking towards Bonnybridge and saw a blue light hovering above the road in front of them. A UFO landed, and a door on the craft opened.
- November 1992: in early November 1992 Central FM began reporting recent sightings of possible UFOs in the Falkirk area. A mother and daughter had a sighting when travelling to Kincardine.

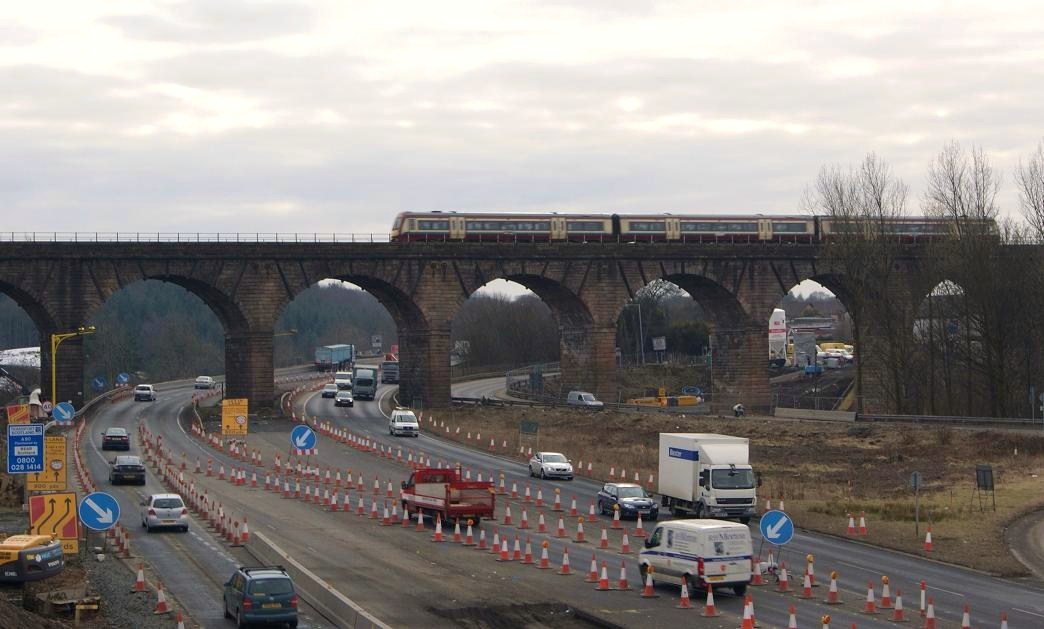
Castlecary Viaduct on the A80 in Scotland

- 15 January 1993: Ray and Cathy Procek, a school dinner lady from Camelon, when driving on the A80 at the Castlecary viaduct, driving to Cumbernauld, see two stationary objects, 300 ft above the ground. The sighting was featured on Strange but True? on 4 November 1994. Nippon Television turned up on May 26 1993, and the Falkirk area was featured on the Eikon programme on Scottish Television in June 1993
- 1993, 31 March: Multiple witnesses across south-west and west England saw a large triangular-shaped UFO speeding across the sky, leaving a luminous wake, and was seen over Ireland. Analysis of the sightings concluded that the object was the re-entry of a Russian booster rocket combined with a later sighting of a police helicopter. It was discussed in the House of Lords on 15 July 1998 with a response from the Labour defence minister John Gilbert, Baron Gilbert, the former MP for Dudley East
- 26 September 1993: a large black triangle is seen over Bakewell in the Derbyshire Dales at 21:30.
- 18 January 1994: the Malcolm family at Larbert in Falkirk, film an elongated object outside their house
- 19 February 1994: a metallic disc-shaped object was filmed over Craigluscar Reservoir near Dunfermline in Scotland by Ian McPherson.
- 30 July 1994: Andy Swan, a 27 year old cable layer with ScottishPower, sees a Toblerone-shaped object at 23:30 near Armadale, West Lothian, moving towards Blackridge, West Lothian. His car was immobilised and the lights stopped working. He called the police, but the police claim this took place at 2.42am. An AA vehicle turned up, but could not start the car. The car was towed away by the AA, and next day, a Sunday morning, his car miraculously started.

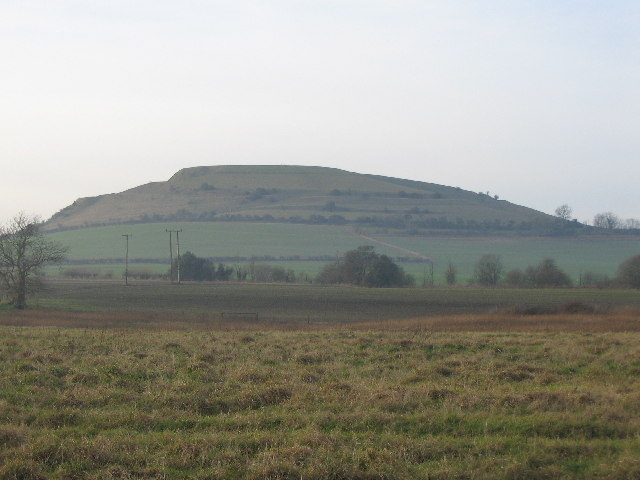
Cley Hill in Wiltshire

- 6 January 1995: pilots aboard a Boeing 737 on British Airways Flight BA5061 from Milan saw an object on their descent to Manchester at 4,000 ft when over the southern Pennines. The reports have been attributed to a bright fireball.
- 5 October 1996: the Wash Incident – in the early morning, a rotating UFO was seen over The Wash by Skegness and Boston police officer David Leyland, and picked up by Claxby ATC radar, although later (partially) explained as a radar echo of St Botolph's Church. The visual sightings were explained as celestial objects. The sighting had been investigated, at a high level, by staff at RAF Kinloss and MoD Northwood in London.
- Saturday 26 October 1996: at 16:10, seen as far north as Ness, Lewis, a UFO incident off the Isle of Lewis, in the Hebrides. Many 999 calls reported a mid-air explosion. A Nimrod from RAF Kinloss investigated, with two rescue helicopters, and the Simon Keghian fishing vessel, from France
- 24 March 1997: At 22:00 on the Dark Peak, Howden Moor, two sonic booms were heard over the area, and recorded at this time. although the RAF denied having supersonic aircraft in the area. They later helped in the night-long search for a crashed aircraft, using helicopters and sniffer dogs from the police with 150 Mountain Rescue volunteers. No wreckage was found. A triangle-shaped UFO had been seen an hour before the sonic booms in the local area.
- 20 September 1998: at Henfield in West Sussex at 03:00, strange lights were seen by two Horsham police officers on the A281 towards Woodmancote, Julian Deans and Sarah Ames. A beam of light shone to the ground.
- 3 February 1999: a Debonair BAe 146 aircraft, with 96 seats, was flying from Linköping/Saab Airport in Sweden to Humberside Airport, with business executives. Over the North Sea, at FL280, their aircraft was bathed in red light from below, for ten seconds, an unnatural bright light. A large cylindrical object was seen 58 miles off the Danish coast, with square windows.
- 11 August 2000: The Sussex police helicopter tracks an object over Brighton at night, on film
- 5 October 2000: A woman named Sharon Rowlands, aged 44, from Bonsall, Derbyshire claimed to have seen a large luminous pink object hovering and rotating over a nearby field, at 21:15 over Middleton Wood. She filmed the object on a camcorder.

== 21st century ==
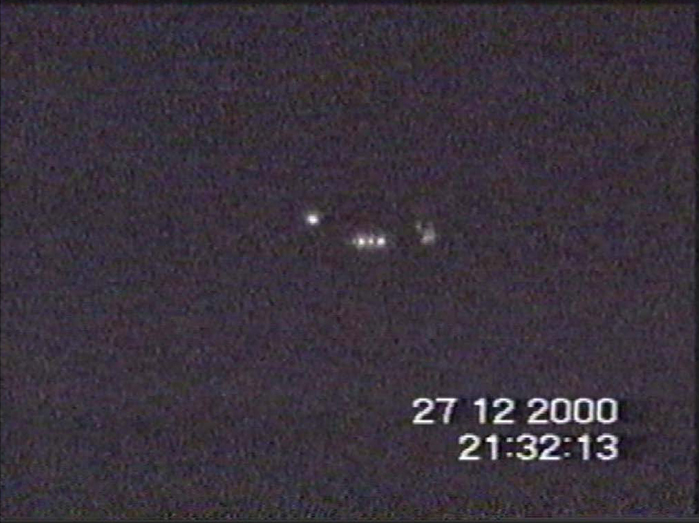
Still from video footage on 27 December 2000 sent to the UK National Archives

- 26 May 2004: a 60 metre long cigar-shaped object was seen over Torquay. Local teenagers later came forward to admit the sighting was caused by their toy inflatable airship.
- June 2005: three white objects were seen flying above the east end of Glasgow on a cloudy sky around midnight. A man from Baillieston was reported to have heard spaceman-esque voices through his electronic equipment around the time of the sighting. Russian Antonov An-30s were proposed as explanations. A similar sighting was seen in Lockeridge, Wiltshire on broad daylight. A man reported seeing three "white metallic craft" while out cycling on the evening of 21 June.
- June, 2006: Cookley Worcestershire sighting of a silent, shiny, silver, triangular object in the evening sky. The object was seen by two people driving home along Lea Lane, heading toward the village of Cookley. It was hovering approximately 5–10 meters above the ground and was traversing the horizon in complete silence.
- November, 2007: Numerous people from the West Midlands conurbation reported sightings in the evening sky of a silent, triangular object, which the press later dubbed the "Dudley Dorito".
- 12 January 2008: A large fleet of UFOs or "glowing red spheres" were seen over Liverpool heading east.
- 8 June 2008: A number of UFO sightings took place in Wales which involved a police helicopter following a UFO over Cardiff near MOD St Athan, the Bristol Channel and nearby areas such as Eglwys Brewis, Barry, and Sully.
- 26 June 2009: British singer Kim Wilde reported having seen a "huge bright light behind a cloud" above her Hertfordshire garden. She described the light as "brighter than the moon, but similar to the light from the moon". Upon further inspection, Wilde reported to have witnessed the light moving "very quickly, from about 11:00 to 1:00. Then it just did that, back and forth, for several minutes ... Whenever it moved, something shifted in the air, but it was silent. Absolutely silent." A second report of this UFO was subsequently made by a fellow local Hertfordshire resident, who had managed to obtain photographic evidence to support the apparent sighting.
- 10 September 2009: In Glen Road, near Lennoxtown, three people in a car were reportedly struck by a colourful beam of light, the event reportedly lasted for over two minutes.
- 13 July 2013: An Airbus A320 pilot encounters an object closing in on his passenger plane, which passes extremely close to the cockpit whilst flying at 34,000 ft above Berkshire. With no time to make an evasive manoeuvre, the Captain instinctively ducked as he believed a collision was imminent.
- In the early hours of 26 February 2016, a witness in Pentyrch, Wales, reported seeing a "huge pyramid of light" over fields close to their home. The witness visited the field, and claimed that the object descended to near the ground, before two objects were ejected from it. Shortly thereafter, a fleet of military aircraft arrived. On the same night, two explosions were reported by members of the public around the local area. The Ministry of Defence have since, in response to freedom of information requests, stated that the substantial military presence in the area was as a result of a routine training exercise. Substantial information has been withheld from subject access request responses, citing Section 26 exemption under the freedom of information act. This has come to be known as the "Pentyrch Incident".

== See also ==
- British UFO Research Association
- List of investigations of UFOs by governments
- List of reported UFO sightings
- UFO sightings in Australia
