= UFOs Declassified =

- Genre: Pseudoscience; Ufology; Conspiracy theory
- Created by: Wayne Abbott & John Moores
- Narrated by: Brad Cartner
- Country of origin: Canada
- Original language: English
- No. of seasons: 1
- No. of episodes: 6

Production
- Production company: Company X Studios

Original release
- Network: History
- Release: January 9 – February 13, 2015

UFOs Declassified is a Canadian television series that premiered on January 9, 2015, on the History Canada channel. Produced by Company X Studios, the program features declassified CIA and US Air Force documents pertaining to notable UFO reports.

== Production ==
The show was created and produced by Wayne Abbott and John Moores. UFOlogists Nick Pope, Leslie Kean, Ben Hansen and Donald Schmitt appear in the first season of the series.

=== Series overview ===
| Season | Episodes | Originally released | |
| Season | Episodes | First released | Last released |
|---|---|---|---|
| 1 | 6 | January 9, 2015 | February 13, 2015 |

=== Season 1 (2015) ===
| No. | Title | Original release date |
|---|---|---|
| 1 | "Red Alert" | January 9, 2015 |
The Rendlesham Forest Incident is featured.
| 2 | "Black Triangles" | January 13, 2015 |
Reports of Black Triangles are featured.
| 3 | "Battle of Los Angeles" | January 23, 2015 |
The 1942 Los Angeles air raid is featured.
| 4 | "UFO Crash Sites" | January 30, 2015 |
Alleged UFO crash sites are featured, including the Roswell Incident.
| 5 | "UFOs vs. Airliners" | February 6, 2015 |
Reports of UFOs made by civilian aircraft are featured.
| 6 | "Shoot 'Em Down" | February 13, 2015 |
Reports of UFOs made by military aircraft are featured.
