= Falls of Tarf =

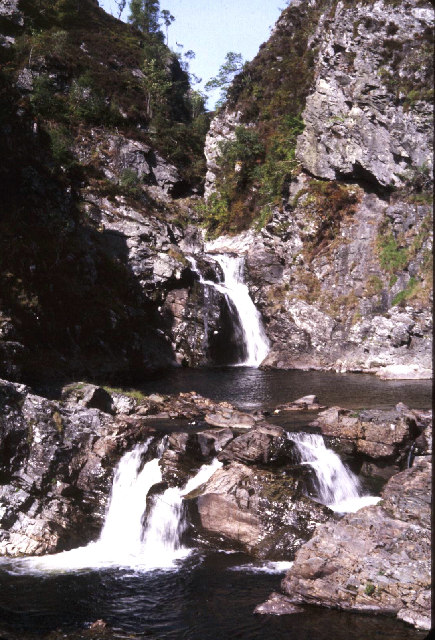
- Fall of Tarf August 1984

- Location within Scotland
- Location: Perth and Kinross, Scotland
- Coordinates: 56.89746°N 3.67121°W
- Watercourse: Tarf Water

The Falls of Tarf is a waterfall on the Tarf Water in the eastern Highlands of Scotland. Immediately downstream of the falls the Tarf is joined by a second, smaller river to become the River Tilt.

== See also ==
- Waterfalls of Scotland
