= Ilkley Moor UFO incident =

Supposed alien abduction in 1987

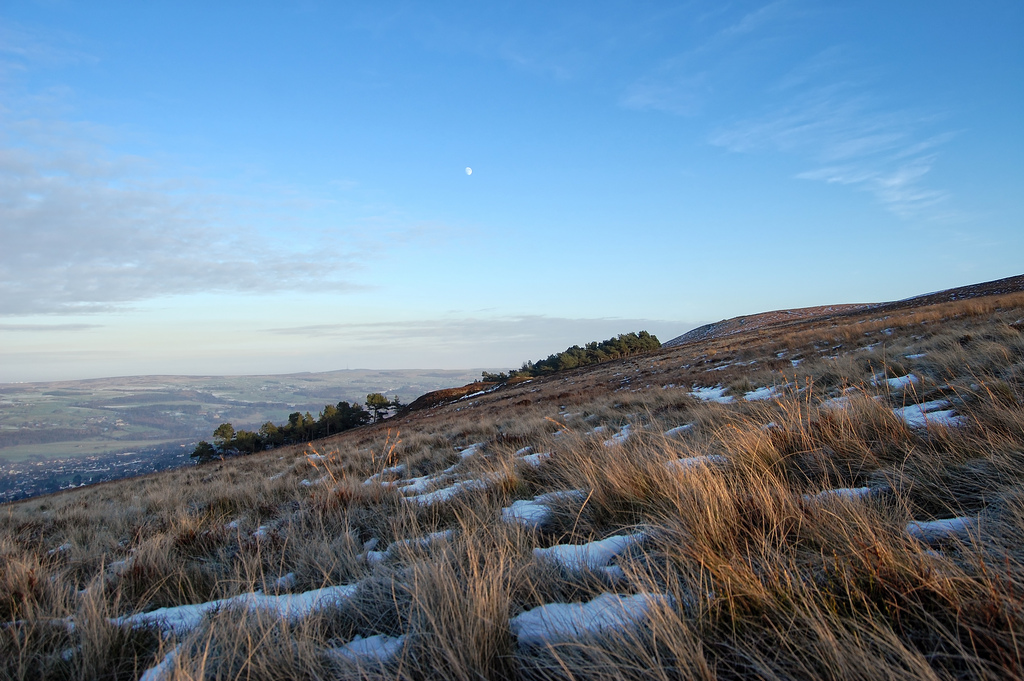
Ilkley Moor on a clear evening

The Ilkley Moor UFO incident refers to an alleged UFO encounter on Ilkley Moor on 1 December 1987. A retired police officer reported being abducted by extraterrestrial beings during a morning walk, briefly detained aboard their craft and subsequently returned to the moor. He took a photograph of the surrounding landscape that he claimed depicted one of the beings involved in the abduction.

The photograph subsequently received coverage in the UK media and has been cited by some UFO researchers as evidence of extraterrestrial visitation. Other assessments have described the image as “incredibly blurry”, while sceptical interpretations have suggested that the figure may depict a person or a cardboard cut-out. The authenticity of the photograph remains disputed.

== Background ==
Ilkley Moor is an area of moorland between Ilkley and Keighley in West Yorkshire, England. The moor has been the site of numerous reported UFO sightings. Sceptical explanations have attributed the frequency of such reports in part to the area's proximity to RAF Menwith Hill and Leeds Bradford Airport.

Philip Spencer, a pseudonym, had moved with his wife and child from London to West Yorkshire following his retirement from the police force, settling closer to his wife's family. On the morning of 1 December 1987, Spencer walked across Ilkley Moor to visit his father-in-law in East Morton. He carried a camera and a compass, the latter intended for use in foggy conditions.

== Incident ==
According to Spencer's account, he was walking up a small hill when he noticed a figure on the trail ahead. He described it as approximately 1.2 metres (3.9 feet) tall, dark green, with a disproportionately large head and long, thin arms. The figure reportedly gestured toward him, which Spencer interpreted as a warning to keep away, but he photographed it before it ran from the area. Spencer followed but lost sight of the being in the fog. He then stated seeing an unidentified craft rise from the moor and disappear into the sky. He described the craft as whitish and composed of two saucer-shaped sections joined along their wider surfaces, accompanied by a loud humming sound. Spencer did not photograph the craft.

Rather than continue along his planned route, Spencer went to another town about 30 minutes away. On arrival, he found that approximately two hours had elapsed. He also noted that his compass was pointing in the opposite direction from the one it should have.

== Initial aftermath ==
In the days following the alleged incident, Spencer made contact with UFO researchers Jenny Randles and Peter Hough. Hough claimed to have been “extremely sceptical” at first but later came to believe Spencer. Spencer handed over the copyright of the photo to Hough. Although the story quickly made the news, Spencer insisted on keeping his anonymity. Various write-ups of the case have made it clear that Spencer did not make any money from the story.

As well as examining the site, Hough sent the photograph to a number of experts. A wildlife photographer who examined the photograph said that it was not from any known animal. Experts from the Kodak laboratory in Hemel Hempstead said that they could not detect any evidence of tampering. Bruce Maccabee, a US Navy optics expert and ufologist, concluded that the photograph was “too grainy for proper testing”.

According to ufologist Nick Redfern, Spencer was hassled by the Ministry of Defence a few days after the incident on the moor. He says that they opened a file on Spencer and sent two men in black to his home to intimidate him into silence.

== Account changed under hypnosis ==
While the photograph was being examined, Spencer claimed that he experienced strange dreams. Following Hough's advice, he attended a session of regressive hypnotherapy. This was carried out by Jim Singleton on 16 March 1988. Under hypnosis, Spencer's original account of the incident changed. Singleton has called it a “genuine recall”.

Spencer now recalled that upon seeing the being on the hill, he was instantly paralysed. He was then lifted up a few feet and pulled into the craft. When he entered the craft, a voice told him to be calm. A group of green aliens then performed medical experiments on him, inserting items into his nose and mouth. He was given a tour of the craft and shown a film. The film showed apocalyptic imagery, including nuclear explosions, famines, and floods. Spencer was then shown a second film. He has never revealed the contents of the second film, saying that the aliens who abducted him do not want humanity to know.

Following this, Spencer was returned to Ilkley Moor, where he then took the famous photograph. He claimed that the alien was actually waving goodbye to him, not telling him to stay away, as in his original account.

== Legacy ==
The Ilkley Moor incident generated headlines in the UK at the time and remains one of the country's most famous UFO sightings. Nick Pope, a journalist who previously worked at the ‘UFO desk’ of the Ministry of Defence, included this event in a 2011 list of "Top 10 UFO incidents in the UK". It has been cited as one of the most persuasive UFO incidents to ever occur.

Sceptics have claimed that the whole incident is a hoax. They have said that the photograph is so blurry that it is far from proof of any alien visitors to Earth. They have argued that the “alien” in the photograph could easily be a man or a cardboard cut-out. Sceptics have also asked why Spencer did not take a photograph of the craft, noting that such a photograph would be more difficult to fake. Sceptics have also dismissed the supposed physical evidence of the broken compass, saying that it is easy to manually wreck compasses.

== See also ==
- UFO sightings in the United Kingdom
