= Open Skies, Closed Minds =

Book by Nick Pope

- Open Skies, Close Minds
- Author: Nick Pope
- Language: English
- Subject: Ufology
- Publisher: Overlook Press
- Publication date: 1996
- Publication place: United Kingdom
- Media type: Print (Hardcover)
- Pages: 270
- ISBN: 0-87951-916-9
- OCLC: 40150668
- Dewey Decimal: 001.942 21
- LC Class: TL789.6.G7 P67 1999
- Followed by: The uninvited : an exposé of the alien abduction phenomenon (1998)

Open Skies, Closed Minds, a book on ufology, expresses the views of Nick Pope, a former UFO investigator with the British Ministry of Defence (MOD).

The book provides an overview of the UFO phenomenon, with the emphasis on Pope's three-year tour of duty as the Ministry of Defence's UFO desk officer. It examines a number of well-known UFO cases, including the Roswell crash and the Rendlesham Forest Incident, as well as a number of less well-known cases from the MOD's UFO case-files. Pope also discusses the politics surrounding the way in which those within government and the military view UFO phenomena.
