= Elizabeth Weiss =

American anthropologist

Elizabeth Weiss is an American anthropologist who has authored several books. She is professor emeritus in the Department of Anthropology at San Jose State University.

== Education ==
In 1996, Weiss received a BA in anthropology from the University of California, Santa Cruz. In 1998, she received an MA in anthropology from California State University, Sacramento. In 2001, she received a PhD from the University of Arkansas in Environmental Dynamics.

From 2002 to 2004, Weiss did post-doctoral work at the Canadian Museum of Civilization.

== Career ==
In 2004, Weiss became a fully tenured professor at San Jose State University.

In April 2021, Weiss gave a presentation at the Society for American Archaeology virtual annual meeting titled "Has Creationism Crept Back into Archaeology?" She stated during the presentation that NAGPRA gives control of scientific research to the religious beliefs of contemporary Native American communities.

In February 2022, Weiss sued San Jose State officials claiming that they retaliated against her for her views and restricted her from accessing skeletal remains that she was studying. She was represented by a lawyer from the Pacific Legal Foundation.

In June 2023, Weiss reached a settlement with San Jose State that allowed her to voluntarily retire with full benefits, effective May 29, 2024. Due to fears that she may be fired and subsequently lose employment benefits, Weiss accepted a voluntary leave to pursue "more fruitful opportunities". She had hoped the lawsuit would pressure the university to reinstate her access to the skeletal remains she had been studying. The judge overseeing the case dismissed her efforts as the Muwekma Ohlone Tribe, which the remains belonged to, would have to be involved in the lawsuit. However, due to the tribe's sovereign immunity, it cannot be sued.

== Personal life ==
Weiss was married to J. Philippe Rushton. She later married journalist Nick Pope who died in 2026 from cancer.

== Awards and honors ==
In 2019, San Jose State's College of Social Sciences conferred on Weiss its Austen D. Warburton Award of Merit for excellence in scholarship.

== Books ==
- Reburying the Past: The Effects of Repatriation and Reburial on Scientific Inquiry (Nova Science Publishers, 2008)
- Bioarchaeological Science: What we have Learned from Human Skeletal Remains (Nova Science Publishers, 2009)
- Introduction to Human Evolution 2010
- Paleopathology in Perspective: Bone Health and Disease through Time (Rowman & Littlefield, 2014)
- Reading the Bones: Activity, Biology, and Culture (University Press of Florida, 2017)
- Repatriation and Erasing the Past with James W. Springer (University Press of Florida, 2020)
- On the Warpath: My Battles With Indians, Pretendians, and Woke Warriors (Academica Press, 2024)
