= Struan, Perthshire =

Coordinates: 56.764°N 3.955°W

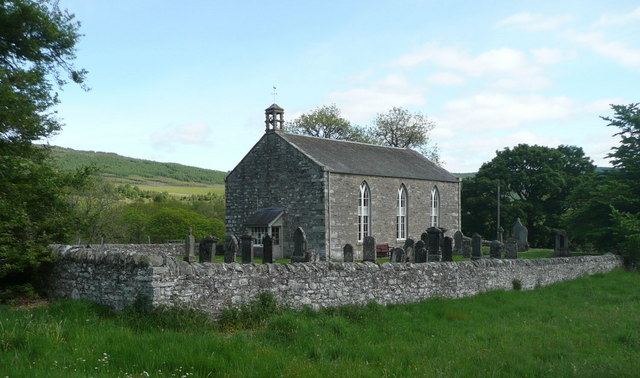
Struan Kirk

Struan is a small village in Perthshire in Scotland. The name derives from sruthan, the Gaelic for 'Little Stream'. It is 8 km west of Blair Atholl.

It is near the confluence of the River Garry and the Errochty Water, and just south of Calvine.
