= Lakenheath-Bentwaters incident =

1956 series of UFO sightings in England

The Lakenheath-Bentwaters Incident was a series of radar and visual contacts with unidentified flying objects over airbases in eastern England on the night of 13–14 August 1956, involving personnel from the Royal Air Force (RAF) and the United States Air Force (USAF). The incident has since gained some prominence in the literature of ufology and the popular media.

The final report of the Condon Committee, which otherwise concluded that UFOs were simple misidentifications of natural phenomena or aircraft, took an unusual position on the case: "In conclusion, although conventional or natural explanations certainly cannot be ruled out, the probability of such seems low in this case and the probability that at least one genuine UFO was involved appears to be fairly high". It has, however, also been argued that the incidents can be explained by false radar returns and misidentification of astronomical phenomena.

== The incident ==
The commonly cited sequence of events is recorded in the original Project Blue Book file by the USAF, subsequently analysed by the Condon Committee's report and by atmospheric physicist James E. McDonald.

The incident began at the USAF-tenanted RAF Bentwaters, Suffolk, on the evening of 13 August 1956. This was a dry, largely clear night with, observers noted, an unusually large number of shooting stars, associated with the Perseid meteor shower.

At 21:30, radar operators at the base tracked a target, appearing similar to a normal aircraft return, approaching the base from the sea at an apparent speed of several thousand miles per hour. They also tracked a group of targets moving slowly to the north-east which merged into a single very large return (several times the strength of that from a B-36) before moving off the scope to the north, as well as a further rapid target proceeding from east to west.

A T-33 trainer from the 512th Fighter Interceptor Squadron, crewed by 1st Lieutenants Charles Metz and Andrew Rowe, was directed to investigate the radar contacts, but saw nothing. No visual sightings of the objects were made from Bentwaters in this period with the exception of a single amber star-like object which was subsequently identified as probably being Mars, then low in the south-east.

At 22:55, a target was detected approaching Bentwaters from the east at a speed estimated around 2,000–4,000 miles per hour (3,200–6,400 km/h). It faded from the scope as it passed over the base (possibly suggesting anomalous propagation as a source for the target, although ground-based radars almost always have a blind spot overhead), reappearing to the west. However, as it passed overhead a rapidly moving white light was observed from the ground, while the pilot of a C-47 at 4,000 feet (1,200 m) over Bentwaters reported that a similar light had passed beneath his aircraft. At this point, Bentwaters alerted the U.S.-tenanted RAF Lakenheath base, 40 miles (64 km) to the north-west, to look out for the targets. Ground personnel at Lakenheath made visual sightings of several luminous objects, including two which arrived, made a sharp change in course, and appeared to merge before moving off. The angular size of these objects was compared to that of a golf ball at arm's length, and they were stated to dwindle to pinpoint size as they moved away, an observation which seemed to rule out a bolide or bright meteor.

The final phase of the incident was described in some detail by Technical Sergeant Forrest Perkins, who was the Watch Supervisor in the Lakenheath Radar Air Traffic Control centre, and who wrote directly to the Condon Committee in 1968. Perkins claimed that two RAF de Havilland Venom interceptors were scrambled and directed towards a radar target near Lakenheath. The pilot of the first Venom achieved contact, but then found that the target manoeuvred behind him and chased the aircraft for a period of around 10 minutes despite the latter's taking violent evasive action; Perkins characterised the pilot as "getting worried, excited and also pretty scared". The second Venom was forced to return to its home station due to engine problems; Perkins stated that the target remained on their screens for a short period before leaving on a northerly heading.

== Investigation by the Condon Committee ==
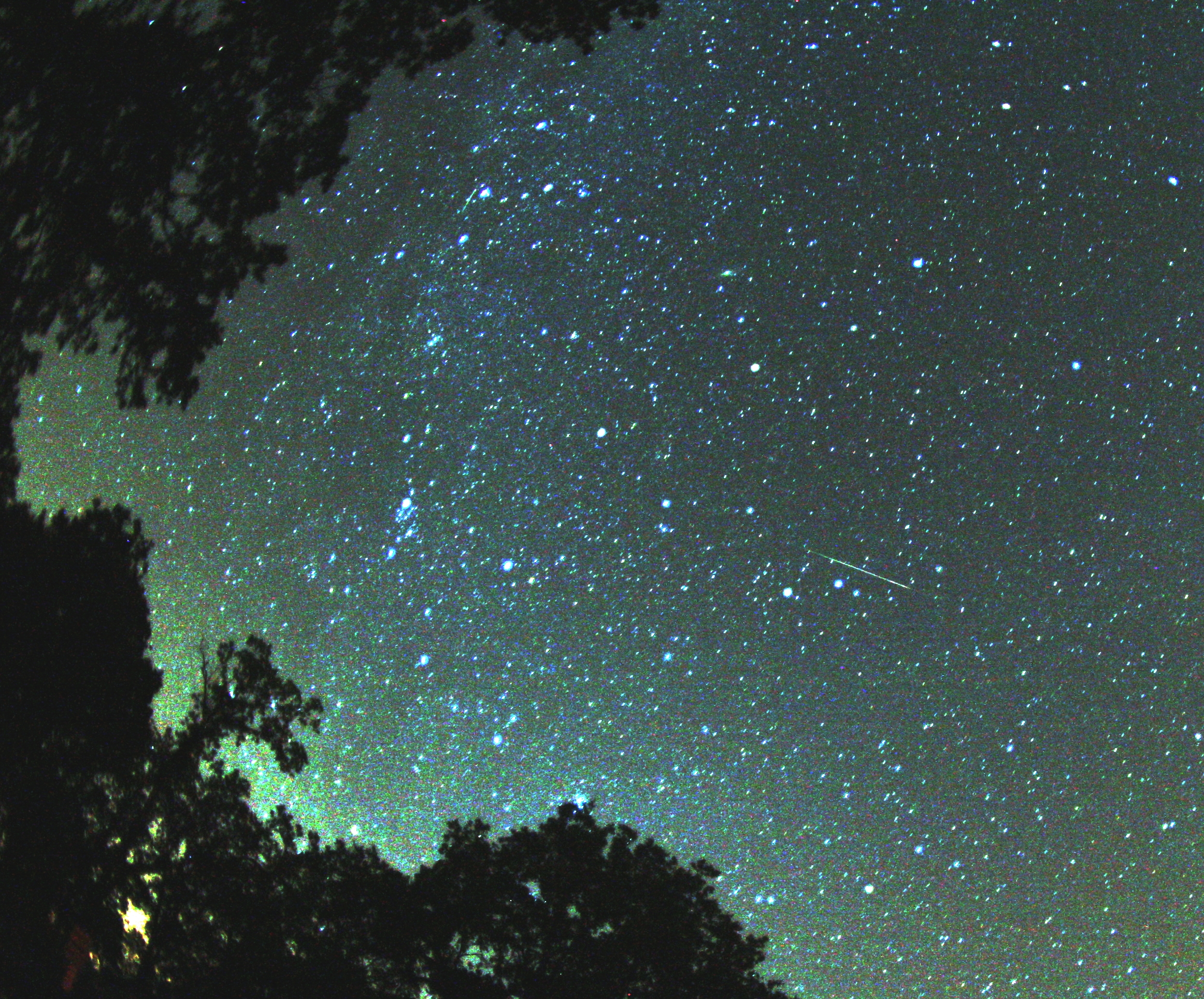
A Perseid meteor

The Condon Committee included the case in its analysis largely in response to Perkins' letter. Aside from the Blue Book file, it was able to obtain a previous classified teleprinter message, transmitted three days after the incident, from 3910th Air Base Group to Air Defence Command at Ent AFB; the teleprinter message's description of the events, including the 'chase' episode, largely agreed with that of Perkins.

Based on the information available, the Committee's researcher (Thayer) felt that while anomalous propagation was possible, the lack of other targets on radar scopes at the time made it unlikely. Focusing on the later phase of the incident at Lakenheath, he came to the remarkable conclusion that "this is the most puzzling and unusual case in the radar-visual files. The apparently rational, intelligent behavior of the UFO suggests a mechanical device of unknown origin as the most probable explanation of this sighting".

Aviation journalist and noted UFO skeptic Philip J. Klass concluded, however, that the incident could be explained as a combination of false radar returns and misperceptions of meteors from the Perseid stream.

== The account of Freddie Wimbledon and a further civilian witness ==
Little information emerged on the case until the late 1970s, when an article in the Daily Express, and a subsequent piece by astronomer Ian Ridpath in the Sunday Times, produced further witnesses. Flight Lieutenant Freddie Wimbledon wrote to the Sunday Times on 19 March 1978 contesting Ridpath's statement that the incident had effectively been explained by Klass.

Wimbledon had been the radar controller on duty at RAF Neatishead at the time of the sightings. While his account of events agreed with that of Perkins in some details, including the description of the aircraft being apparently chased by the object, he stated that it had in fact been his team who directed the two Venoms to the interception and that the U.S. personnel at Lakenheath would have been merely listening in on the frequency he had provided. Wimbledon disagreed with Klass' analysis, remembering the incident as involving a solid radar return tracked from three sets on the ground and one in the intercepting aircraft.

The same 1978 press interest in the case also elicited a letter from a John Killock to the Daily Express in which he claimed to have seen, in August 1956, both a single, rapidly traveling white light at Ely, along with a Venom, and subsequently an odd group of amber lights.

== Recent research ==
Four British Fortean researchers, Dr. David Clarke, Andy Roberts, Martin Shough, and Jenny Randles, have since conducted a study that has indicated that the incident, or incidents, were much more complex than the Condon Report had suggested.

Most significantly, the aircrews originally involved in the incident, Flying Officers David Chambers and John Brady from the first aircraft and Flying Officers Ian Fraser-Ker and Ivan Logan from the second, were located and interviewed. The aircrews involved all flew with 23 Squadron from RAF Waterbeach and were scrambled at 02:00 and 02:40 on 14 August – around two hours later than Wimbledon and Perkins claimed the interceptions occurred.

In contrast to the reports given in the original classified teleprinter message and in the accounts of both Wimbledon and Perkins, the aircrews both stated that the radar contacts obtained were unimpressive and that no 'tail-chase', or action on the part of the target, occurred. They also asserted no visual contacts were made. The first pilot, Chambers, commented that "my feeling is that there was nothing there, it was some sort of mistake", while Ivan Logan, the second Venom's navigator, stated that "all we saw was a blip which rather indicated a stationary target". At the time, 23 Squadron decided that the radar contact had, if anything, been with a weather balloon.

To add to the contradictory nature of the accounts collected, another Venom crew was traced who had been scrambled much earlier in the evening. Flying Officers Leslie Arthur and Grahame Scofield were not told of the nature of their target and were forced to return to base after the aircraft's wingtip fuel tanks malfunctioned; Scofield recalled listening in to the radio communications of the intercepting pilots while back at Waterbeach later in the evening. Scofield's account of the overheard radio transmissions agreed, puzzlingly, with those of Wimbledon and Perkins, though he felt able to identify the crews as Chambers / Brady and Fraser-Ker / Logan. The time and path of Scofield's flight was identified as one which could also convincingly explain the sighting of a Venom at Ely by the civilian, Killock, who had claimed to see anomalous lights.

The new research additionally revealed that 23 Squadron's Commanding Officer, Wing Commander (later Air Commodore) A. N. Davis, had also been diverted to investigate the radar returns while flying a Venom from RAF Coltishall. As the interception would have occurred at the same time as that described by Wimbledon and Perkins, it has been suggested that Davis and another pilot were the two described in their accounts. Since the officers and pilots did not make visual contact with the objects, the most likely conclusion is that radar spoofing technology was being tested. Radar jamming and deception is a technique used particularly by militaries to create false targets on radar.

== See also ==
- Rendlesham Forest incident
- UFO sightings in the United Kingdom
