= Little Rissington UFO incident =

Alleged UFO sighting in 1952

The Little Rissington UFO incident was an encounter in October 1952 between a Gloster Meteor and three unidentified saucer-shaped objects over Gloucestershire.

== Position ==
RAF Little Rissington is a base to the west of the A424 in eastern Gloucestershire, east of Little Rissington in Cotswold District. From the 1940s, the base was the home of the Central Flying School. The eastern edge of the airfield meets the Oxfordshire boundary with Gloucestershire. The airfield is the point where the Gloucestershire boundary crosses the A424.

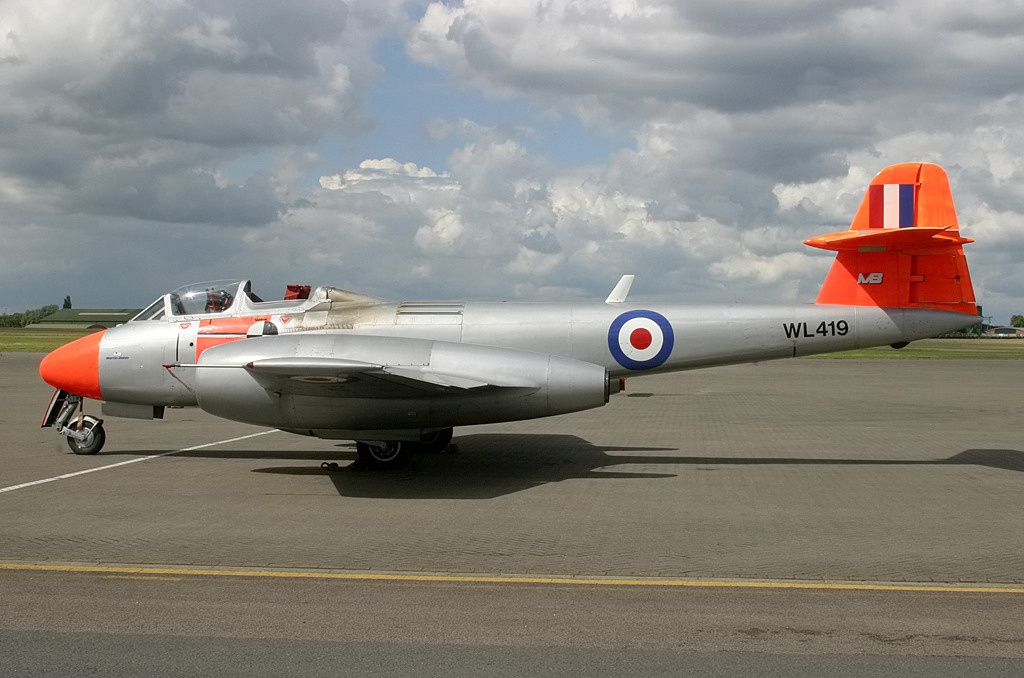
Gloster Meteor T.7

== Background ==
Michael John Eldon Swiney OBE (19 August 1926 – 30 September 2016) was the son of Major-General Sir Neville Swiney (10 June 1897 – 21 May 1970), and was known as Mick. He attended Cheltenham College, and later moved to Brancaster in Norfolk in the late 1970s. Flying Officer Swiney married Janet, the daughter of screenwriter Ian Dalrymple, at St Lawrence's church at Bourton-on-the-Water, on Saturday 7 August 1948. Both Janet and Michael were from Bourton-on-the-Water; his parents lived at 'Springfield'. His brother, Colonel David Alexander Swiney, served in the Royal Artillery from 1944 in the Second World War, later living in Bourton-on-the-Water, and married Hazel Anne Elizabeth Joynes of Frinton-on-Sea, daughter of Colonel Joynes, in October 1950.

He was awarded the OBE in the 1968 Birthday Honours. From 1965, he was a Wing Commander at Coltishall, where he was chief instructor on the English Electric Lightning until 1969. He was station commander of RAF Leuchars from 28 January 1972 until 12 October 1973. Janet died in 2011.

== Encounter ==
On 21 October 1952 in the afternoon, Flt Lt (later Air Commodore) Michael Swiney and Lieutenant David Crofts, a Royal Navy pilot, took off on a training flight from RAF Little Rissington in a Gloster Meteor VII (T.7), powered by two Rolls-Royce Derwent engines. At 12,000 feet (3,700 m), they came through a layer of cloud to witness three white saucer-shaped objects, which they reported to be at 35,000 feet (11,000 m). Initially, the pilots had thought they were parachutes. The pilots noted that the shape of the saucers was "perfectly circular", and their Meteor aircraft climbed to 35,000 feet (11,000 m).

Flt Lt Swiney reported the three anomalies to his Ground Control at RAF Sopley, and abruptly cancelled the training flight. Lt Crofts asked whether to pursue the three objects, but Flt Lt Swiney declined. The objects crossed over the Meteor's path, from left to right (starboard). They remained on their starboard side. In a fraction of a second, all three disappeared.

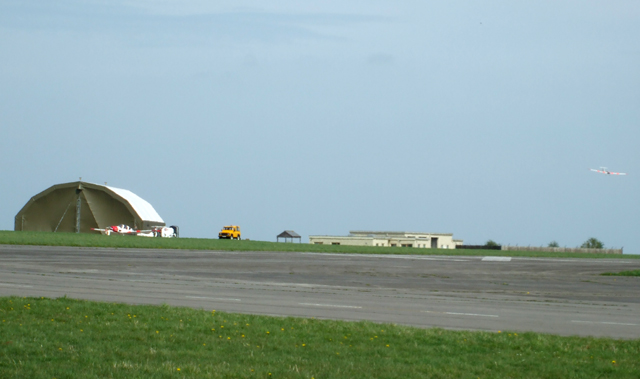
RAF Little Rissington in February 2011

=== Radar reports ===
ATCC Gloucester (RAF Staverton, now Gloucestershire Airport next to junction 11 of the M5) confirmed the three objects that the pilots had seen. Two Meteor F.8 aircraft of RAF Fighter Command were scrambled to intercept the objects. The objects were heading east at 600 knots. The fighter aircraft did not make contact with the objects.

The RAF Southern Sector, based in Wiltshire, had detected three objects entering their airspace at 3,000 miles per hour (4,800 km/h).

== Publicity ==
On 9 January 2004, the incident was covered in the edition (Ep 1, Season 23) of Timewatch on BBC Two called Britain's X Files, directed by Michael Wadding and edited by John Farren. It was covered on Season 2 of UFO Files. Additionally, the incident is covered in Season 1, Episode 4 of UFO Europe: The Untold Stories.

== 2024 Suspected UFO Incident ==
On 30 November 2024, there was an additional UFO sighting at the airfield, whilst it was being used by 612 VGS. After the flying operations for the day had completed at around 1300 hours, a T-shaped object was seen by multiple individuals hovering at 50 feet (15 m) above the centre of the airfield. Initially, the station personnel believed that this could be another unmanned aircraft system (UAS) airspace breach, as part of the series of recent airspace breaches of RAF Lakenheath, RAF Mildenhall, and RAF Feltwell, which took place a week prior.

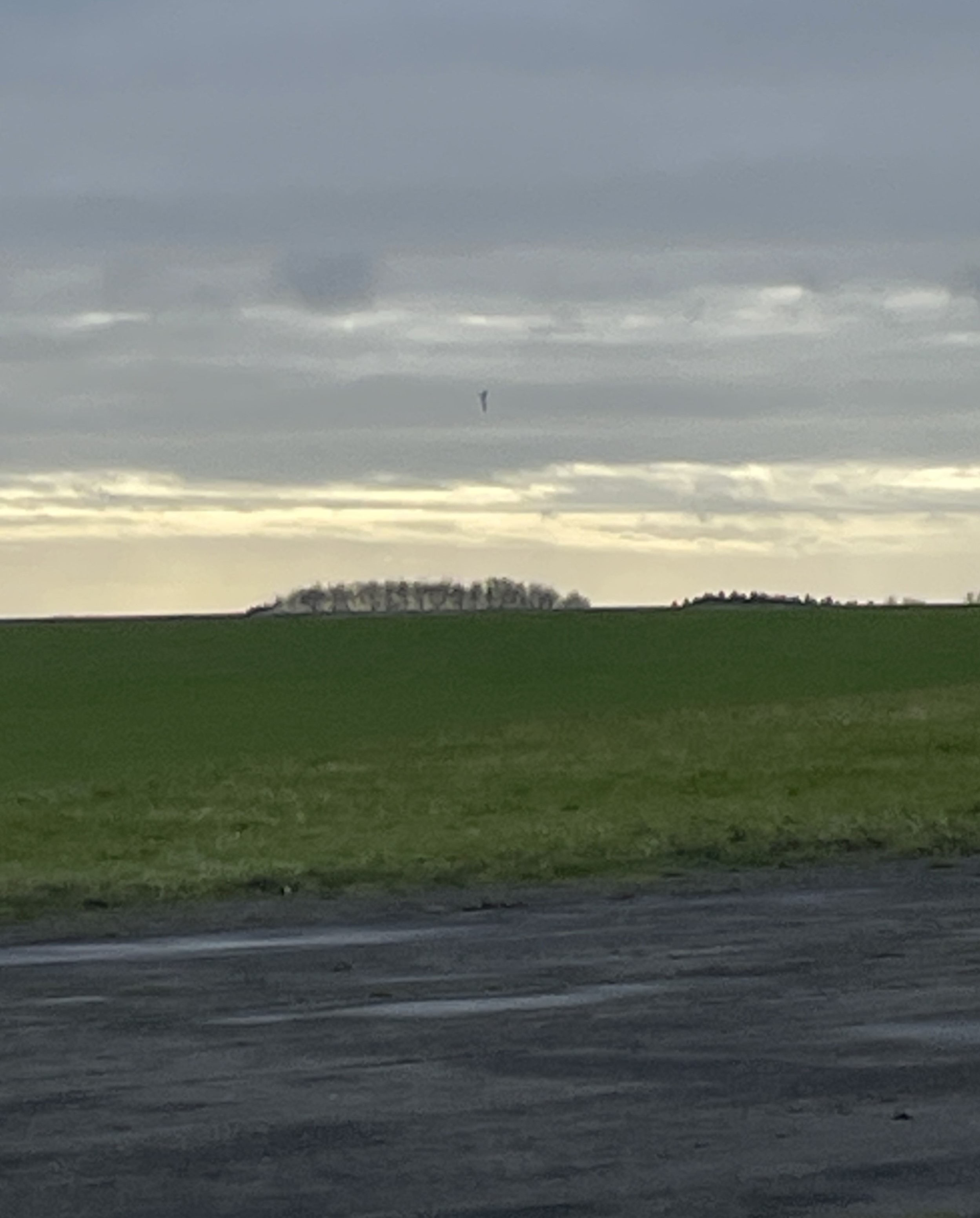
Initial sighting of 2024 object

After discussing the sighting using handheld radios, a group of three Flight Staff Cadets and a RAFAC staff member travelled towards the object, with one cadet tackling the object to the ground. After being brought back to the Squadron HQ, the object was examined and determined to be multiple flexible helium containers (balloons), approximately 2 metres (6.6 ft) in length, and of unknown origin. Since the incident, one of the containers can be found in the Squadron Crew Room.

== See also ==
- Cotswold Air Show
- Reported UFO sightings in the United Kingdom
