= Calvine =

Hamlet in Perth and Kinross, Scotland

Coordinates: 56.768°N 3.958°W

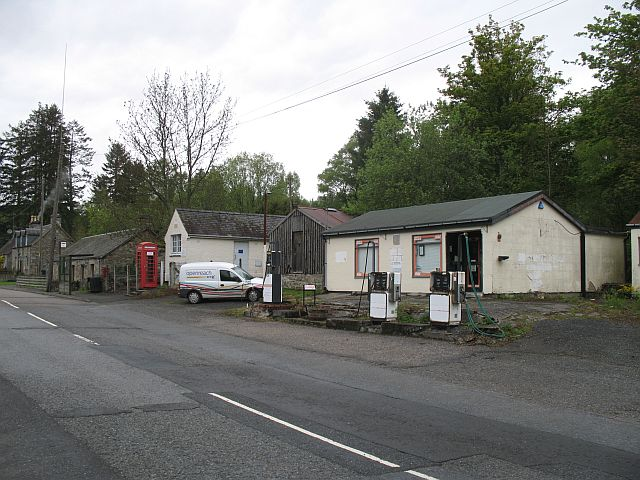
- Buildings on the old route of the A9 at Calvine, seen in 2008

- Location within Perth and Kinross
- OS grid reference: NN 8039 6579
- Council area: Perth and Kinross
- Lieutenancy area: Perth and Kinross
- Country: Scotland
- Sovereign state: United Kingdom
- Police: Scotland
- Fire: Scottish
- Ambulance: Scottish

Calvine is a hamlet in Perth and Kinross, Scotland.

It is sandwiched between the A9 road, to its north, and the Highland mainline railway and River Garry, both to its south, and lies just north of Struan and west of Pitagowan. The Falls of Bruar are one mile to the south-west. The former route of the A9, now the B847, runs through the settlement.

The hamlet is known for the Calvine UFO sighting, which took place on the moors above the village. One evening in early August 1990, two walkers on the moors apparently encountered a mysterious diamond-shaped UFO hovering in mid-air. They photographed it and took their story and the resulting negatives to the Daily Record in Glasgow; however, both they and the negatives then disappeared. The only surviving original photograph was discovered and published some 32 years later in August 2022 by Dr David Clarke of Sheffield Hallam University, since when the Calvine UFO sighting has attracted much media attention with some commentators claiming it to be one of the best UFO photographs ever.
