= Operation Lightning Strike (military operation) =

Military training exercise

Operation Lightning Strike was a military training exercise of the Lithuanian Army that took place in May 2015.

The operation was designed to test troop readiness for a situation similar to the events leading to the current internal unrest in Ukraine and Crimea; with unidentified armed groups attempting to seize control of vital infrastructure, such as airports, government buildings and military installations. The scenario also assumed that such groups would be led or supported by "little green men" - clandestine Russian soldiers.

The four-day operation involved primarily about 2,500-3,000 troops of the Lithuanian "Rapid Response Force".

The training exercise was followed by a larger NATO exercise Operation Saber Strike in June 2015.
