= Nick Pope (journalist) =

British UFO writer (1965–2026)

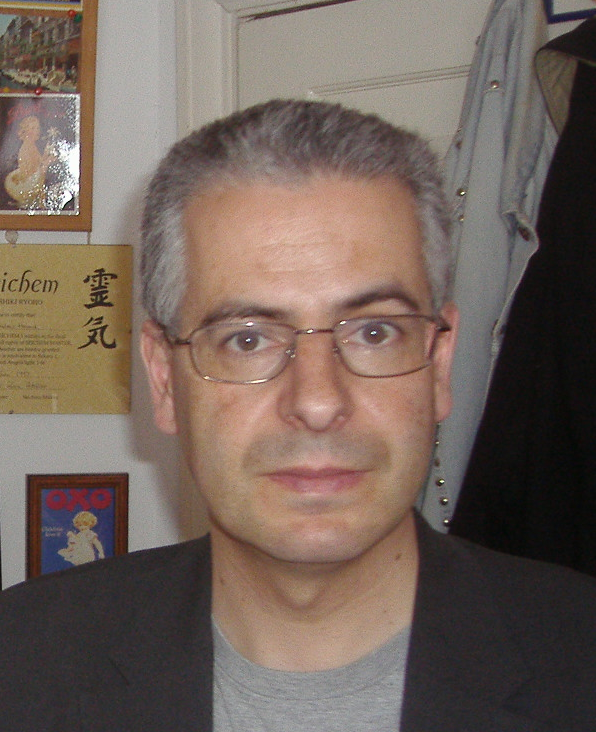
- Pope in 2008
- Born: Nicholas George Pope; 19 September 1965; London, England
- Died: 6 April 2026 (aged 60); Tucson, Arizona, US
- Occupations: TV personality; author; civil servant
- Spouse: Elizabeth Weiss

Nicholas George Pope (19 September 1965 – 6 April 2026), was an English UFO investigator, author, media commentator and civil servant. He was a regular guest on the History Channel series Ancient Aliens, and while employed by the Ministry of Defence (MoD) was responsible for investigating UFO phenomena. He has been called the real-life Fox Mulder of The X-Files.

== Family and education ==
Pope was born in London on 19 September 1965. He was the son of George Pope, who was an aeronautical engineer and director of the Ministry of Defence’s Royal Aircraft Establishment at Farnborough, and Rosemary Pope (née Harden). Pope's grandfather was newspaper manager Sir George Reginald Pope. Pope was educated at Lord Wandsworth College, a private school in Hampshire, England, and joined the civil service in 1985 at the age of 19.

== Career ==
=== Ministry of Defence ===
Pope worked as a civil servant for the Ministry of Defence (MoD) from 1985 to 2006. From 1991 to 1994, he worked in the Secretariat (Air Staff) Sec (AS) 2a, more commonly known as the "UFO desk", where his duties included investigating reports of UFO sightings, to see if they had any defence significance. His final posting in the MoD was to the Directorate of Defence Security. In 2009, the MoD announced that UFO sightings would no longer be investigated.

=== Media work ===
In November 2006, Pope stated that the government's "X-Files have been closed down". He came to appear in the media as a commentator, covering subjects that include the unexplained, conspiracy theories, space, science fiction, and fringe science. He worked for a number of film companies and public relations agencies, promoting the release of science fiction films. On 24 June 2013, he appeared on IGN's comedy show Up at Noon, promoting the game The Bureau: XCOM Declassified. In 2015, he appeared in multiple episodes of UFOs Declassified, airing on Canada's History Television, the UK's Yesterday, and Smithsonian Channel in the United States. He often appeared on the New York Post UFO YouTube series The Basement Office alongside journalist Steven Greenstreet.

=== Tours ===
In 2024, Pope joined his Ancient Aliens co-hosts Giorgio A. Tsoukalos, William Henry, and Jason Martell on the Ancient Aliens LIVE US Tour, where he continued to advocate the hypothesis that extraterrestrials have visited Earth for thousands of years.

== Personal life ==
Pope was born in England on 19 September 1965. He moved to the United States in 2012 and married American anthropologist Elizabeth Weiss after meeting her in San Jose, California.

On 12 February 2026, Pope published a statement on his X account that he had been diagnosed with stage IV oesophageal cancer, which had metastasised to his liver. Pope died at his residence in Tucson, Arizona, two months later, on 6 April, aged 60.

== Books ==
Open Skies, Closed Minds (1996) is Pope's autobiographical account of his interest in ufology. It provides an overview of the UFO phenomenon, with the emphasis on Pope's three-year employment as the Ministry of Defence desk officer where his responsibilities included investigating UFO sightings and any impact they might have on UK national defence. Pope concluded that an alien race is waging a secret war on humanity, a position he came to distance himself from since the publication of the book. In 1997, he released a second book on similar themes, titled The Uninvited. Pope wrote the introduction to Colin Bennet's 2005 book on Captain Edward J. Ruppelt and Project Blue Book, An American Demonology: Flying Saucers Over The White House.

His book Encounter in Rendlesham Forest: The Inside Story of the World's Best-Documented UFO Incident, written with John Burroughs, USAF, Ret., and Jim Penniston, USAF, Ret., was published by Thomas Dunne Books in April 2014. Pope also wrote two science fiction novels, Operation Thunder Child and its sequel Operation Lightning Strike. In 2018, Pope published the political thriller Blood Brothers.

- Pope, Nick (1996). Open Skies, Closed Minds: For the First Time a Government UFO Expert Speaks Out. London: Simon & Schuster. ISBN 978-0-684-81664-7.
- Pope, Nick (1997). The Uninvited: An Exposé of the Alien Abduction Phenomenon. London: Simon & Schuster. ISBN 978-0-684-81927-3.
- Pope, Nick; Burroughs, John; Penniston, Jim (2014). Encounter in Rendlesham Forest: The Inside Story of the World's Best-Documented UFO Incident. New York: Dunne. ISBN 978-1-250-03810-4.
