= Operation Thunder Child =

1999 novel by Nick Pope

- Cover of the 1999 novel by UFO desk MoD operative Nick Pope. In this novel Nick Pope speculated that alien bodies (EBEs), had been taken to Porton Down.
- Author: Nick Pope
- Language: English
- Publication date: 1999

Operation Thunder Child is a 1999 novel by British civil servant Nick Pope. Since Pope had worked for the British Ministry of Defence on the subject of unidentified flying objects, the book had to be cleared by the Ministry prior to publication.

A sequel, Operation Lightning Strike, was published in 2000.

== Plot summary ==
The novel deals with UFOs and alien abductions, illustrating how the government and military cope with an increasingly intrusive and hostile alien presence. It draws on government work on UFOs and is a "what if" novel that reflects some of the author's concerns about the defence and national security issues raised by the UFO phenomenon. The book is a techno-thriller that draws on real crisis-management procedures.

== Critical reception ==
The book received mixed reviews, with reviewers both describing it as an "excellent read" and describing the political content of the book as confusing and close to ranting, while other reviewers question the scientific plausibility of aspects of the novel.

== Sequel ==
In Operation Lightning Strike, the limited battles in the previous book give way to all-out war, with the fate of Earth hanging in the balance. As with Operation Thunder Child, the book needed official clearance. This is unusual in fiction.
