= Aldclune =

Coordinates: 56.751826°N 3.805393°W

Aldclune: Scottish Gaelic: Allt Cluaine
- Location within Perth and Kinross
- OS grid reference: NN897637
- Council area: Perth and Kinross
- Country: Scotland
- Sovereign state: United Kingdom
- Police: Scotland
- Fire: Scottish
- Ambulance: Scottish

Aldclune is a village in Perth and Kinross, Scotland. It is on the B8079 road, approximately 1 1/2 miles (2.5 kilometres) east of Blair Atholl, on the north bank of the River Garry. At the eastern edge of the village is the site of the Battle of Killiecrankie, which took place in 1689 during the Jacobite rising of 1689–92.

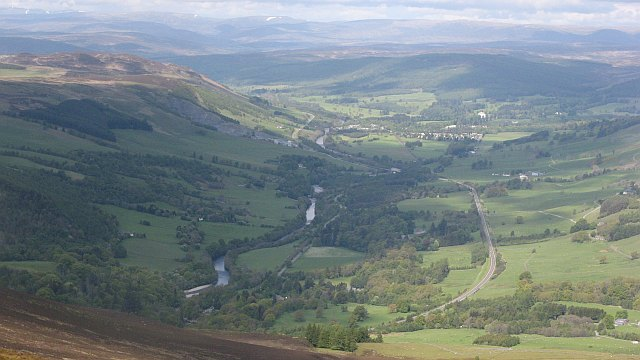
Glen Garry, taken from Meall Uaine, looking past Killiecrankie and Auldclune towards Blair Atholl
