= River Garry, Perthshire =

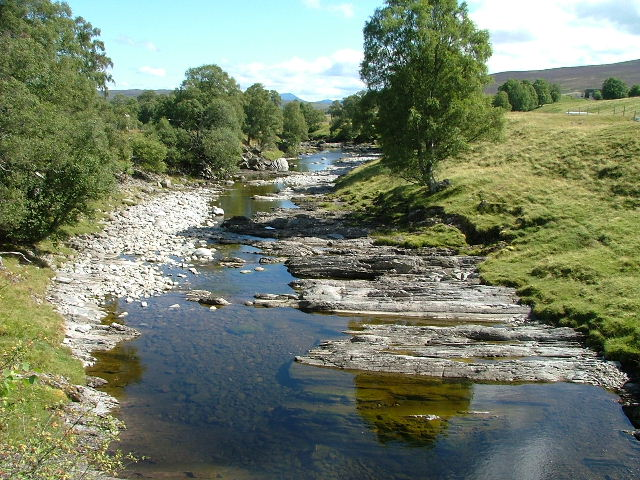
River Garry at Dalnacardoch

The River Garry (Scottish Gaelic: Gar / Abhainn Ghar) is a major tributary of the River Tummel, itself a tributary of the River Tay, in the traditional county of Perthshire in the Scottish Highlands. It emerges from the northeastern end of Loch Garry (56.8193°N 4.2311°W), just to the southeast of the Pass of Drumochter, and flows southeastwards and eastwards down Glen Garry to the narrow Pass of Killiecrankie beyond which it joins the Tummel (56.7182°N 3.7790°W).

Loch Garry itself is fed by the Allt Shallainn, Allt na Duinish and Allt na Cosaig which enter its southern end. The loch occupies a deep northeast-southwest aligned trench cut by glacial action. Glen Garry provides the main route northwards for both the A9 road and the railway from Perth to Inverness.

== Tributaries ==
The principal tributaries of the Garry are the Allt Dubhaig, Edendon Water, Errochty Water, Bruar Water and the River Tilt. Arising in the Dalnaspidal Forest, the Allt Dubhaig joins the Garry near Dalnaspidal Lodge at the southern end of the Pass of Drumochter. The Edendon Water, known above Sronphadruig Lodge as the Allt a' Chama Choire, is a left-bank tributary of the Garry, joining it from the Dalnacardoch Forest at Edendon Bridge beside Dalnacardoch Lodge. A map by Timothy Pont shows its valley as still wooded along its entire 14.3 km. length in the late 16th Century. The Errochty Water flows through Glen Errochty to enter the right bank of the Garry. Above the hamlet of Trinafour the river is impounded behind Errochty Dam as Loch Errochty. The Bruar Water arises from the confluence of several headwater streams at OS grid ref NN 819804 and flows southwards through Glen Bruar for several miles. One mile (two kilometres) to the northeast of the village of Calvine it drops over the Falls of Bruar and shortly afterwards enters the Garry on its left bank.

The River Tilt arises from the confluence of the Tarf Water with the Allt Garbh Buidhe at OS grid ref NN 983797 from which point it flows in a southwesterly direction down the fault-aligned Glen Tilt. In the vicinity of Marble Lodge it turns gradually to a more southerly course and flowing under the Bridge of Tilt at Blair Atholl enters the left bank of the Garry. The Tarf Water follows a course from the west to plunge over the Falls of Tarf before joining the Tilt. Other tributaries of the Tilt include the burn known as An Lochain which drains the curiously named Loch Loch, and the Allt Mhairc which originates at the diminutive Loch Mhairc. The Allt Ghirnaig is a lesser tributary of the Garry whose headwaters arise on the southern slopes of Beinn a' Ghlo. It is the last to join via its left bank before the Garry enters the Tummel.
