= Falls of Bruar =

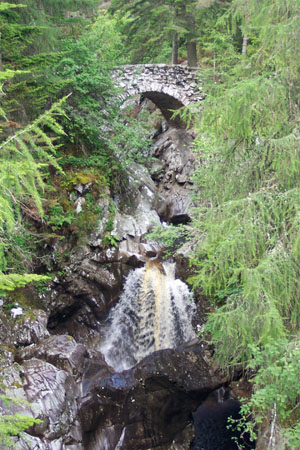
- The Lower Bridge over the falls

- Location within Scotland
- Location: Pitlochry, Perth and Kinross, Scotland
- Coordinates: 56.778671°N 3.932712°W
- Total height: 60 m (200 ft)

Designations

Inventory of Gardens and Designed Landscapes in Scotland
- Official name: Falls of Bruar
- Designated: 31 March 2006
- Reference no.: GDL00177

The Falls of Bruar are a series of waterfalls on the Bruar Water in Scotland, about 8 miles (13 kilometres) from Pitlochry in the council area of Perth and Kinross. They have been a tourist attraction since the 18th century and were immortalized in a poem by Robert Burns, The Humble Petition of Bruar Water to the Noble Duke of Atholl, supposedly from the river itself entreating the Duke to plant some trees in the then barren landscape.

== Description ==
The falls were probably formed some time in the last 10,000 years, after the retreat of the glaciers at the end of the last ice age. The waters slowly cut through the rock which had been pushed up by the geological forces which formed the Scottish Highlands some 500 million years ago. The layering of the rocks means that the water has cut a meandering path through the softer rock and left the harder rock untouched. This has led to the creation of deep pools, outcrops and, in one place, a natural arch. The falls consist of two large falls and a number of smaller drops. The water is often coloured brown from the peat through which it flows.

Nowadays, the A9 Perth to Inverness road passes near the foot of the falls in Glen Garry, and there is a shopping centre and car park from where visitors may access the falls. A circular footpath leads up to the Lower Bridge, close to the natural arch, and continues on to the Upper Bridge, about 1/2 mile (800 metres) from the car park, before returning down the opposite bank.

The total drop of the falls is about 60 metres. The narrowness of the gorge means that the falls are most impressive after heavy rain, but since the construction of a hydroelectric power scheme in the late 1940s, water is extracted farther up the river and the falls no longer reach the volumes they once did.

== History ==
The falls first became popular as a tourist attraction at the end of the 18th century. At that time, the Bruar Water flowed through a treeless, barren landscape, and the falls were said to be a somewhat disappointing sight for those forced to make their way over the slippery rocks and steep banks to view them. William Gilpin, who visited the falls in 1776, thought them:

Scarce worth so long and perpendicular a walk. One of them indeed is a grand fall, but is so naked in its accompaniments that ... it is of little value.

Robert Burns, although taken with the falls themselves, was unimpressed by the lack of vegetation. After his visit in 1787, he wrote the poem,The Humble Petition of Bruar Water to the Noble Duke of Atholl. It entreated John Murray, 4th Duke of Atholl, the owner of the land, to plant some trees and bushes around the falls:

Would then my noble master please
To grant my highest wishes,
He'll shade my banks wi' tow'ring trees,
And bonnie spreading bushes.

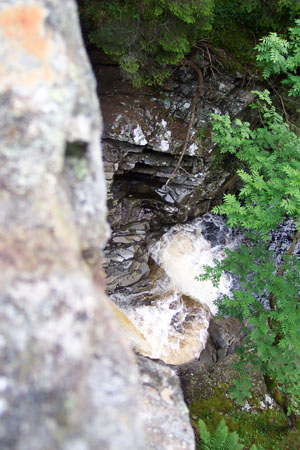
View down from the Upper Bridge

Almost ten years later, after Burn's death in 1796, Murray began an ambitious scheme of planting that would eventually include 120,000 Larch and Scots Pine. The Duke was of the opinion that the planting should be both pleasing to the eye and profitable. He was eventually to become known as "Planter John", planting over 15 million trees throughout his estates during his lifetime. At the Falls of Bruar he also laid out the path that is still in use today, constructed the two bridges as viewpoints over the falls, and built a large number of huts and shelters. The huts were disliked by some visitors, and eventually fell into disrepair: only the partial remains of one stone hut can still be seen. William Wordsworth objected to the neatness of the paths when he visited in 1815, but the harsh lines of these have mellowed over the years. During the Victorian period many Rhododendron were planted to enhance the landscape.

Most of the trees were cut down during World War II. Once hostilities ended, the trees were replanted, again with Scots Pine but this time mixed with Hybrid Larch, Fir and Spruce. Native species were also allowed to colonize the banks: nowadays, the conifers are mixed with Mountain Ash, Willow, Aspen and Birch.

== See also ==
- List of waterfalls of the United Kingdom
