= River Tilt =

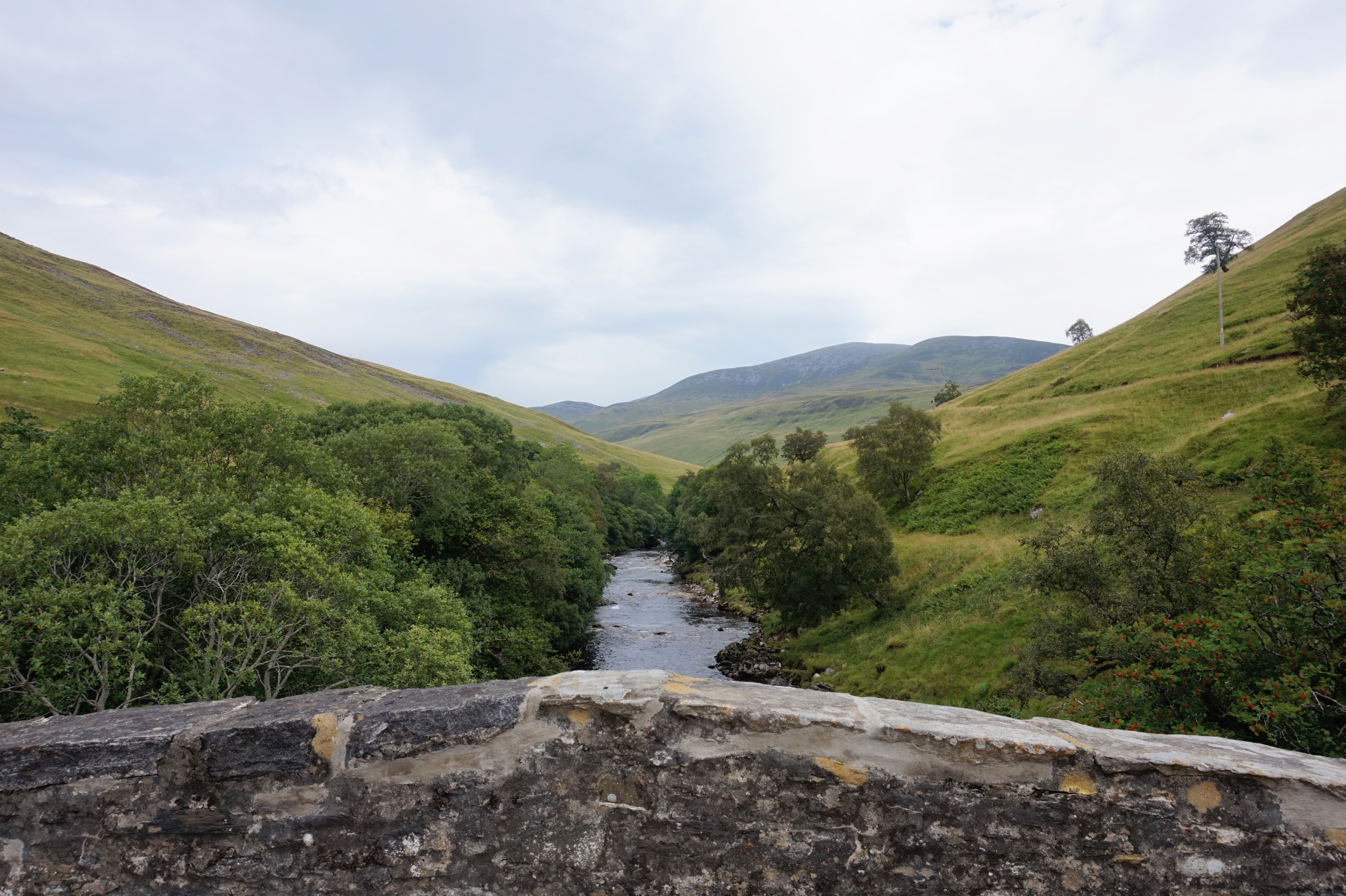
- Looking downstream from Gow's Bridge, the first crossing of the river on its journey south

Location
- Country: Scotland

Physical characteristics
- Source: Taft Water and Allt Garbh Buidhe
  - coordinates: 56.89623962°N 3.67064287°W
  - elevation: 392 m (1,286 ft)
- Mouth: River Garry
  - location: Blair Atholl
  - coordinates: 56.761957511°N 3.84488451°W
  - elevation: 122 m (400 ft)

The River Tilt is a tributary of the River Garry in Perth and Kinross, Scotland. It is sourced from the confluence of Tarf Water and the Allt Garbh Buidhe, from which point it flows in a southwesterly direction down the fault-aligned Glen Tilt. In the vicinity of Marble Lodge, it turns gradually to a more southerly course and, at Blair Atholl, enters the left bank of the Garry after being bisected by two islands. The river's elevation drops 270 metres (890 ft) between source and mouth.

It is crossed by five bridges on its course, the last one being the Bridge of Tilt, at Blair Atholl village, which carries the traffic of the B8079.

Woodland walks from nearby Blair Castle pass beside the river.

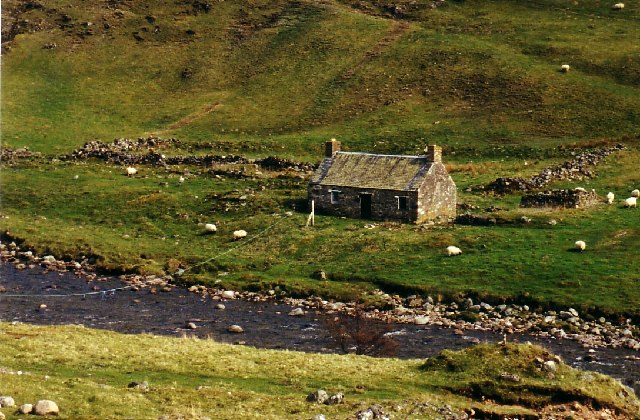
An aerial ropeway spanning the river, approximately halfway along its course, provides a resident easy access to their cottage (2000)

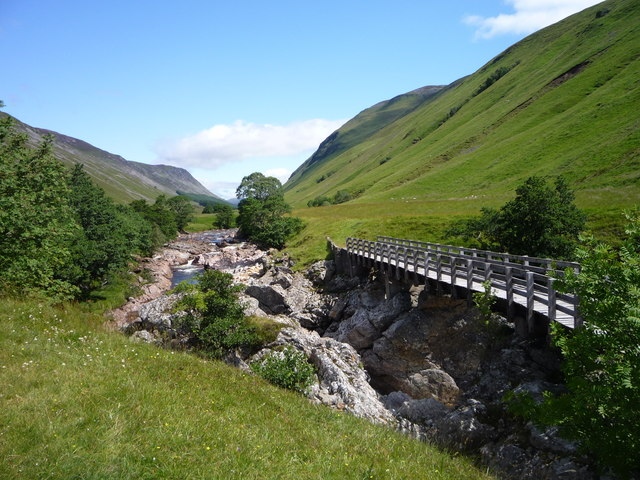
A footbridge across the river

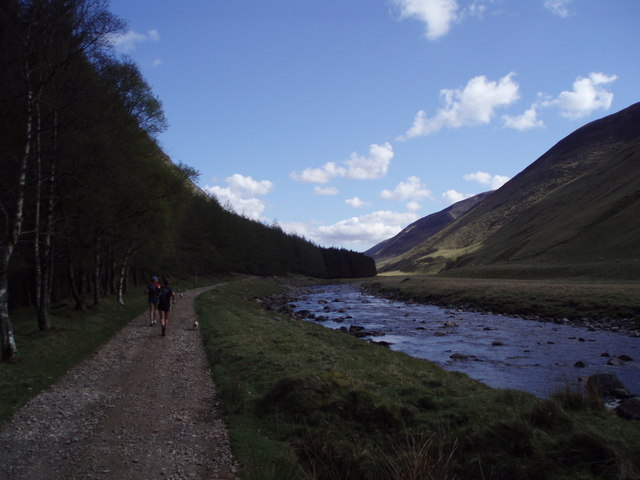
Glen Tilt
