= Rendlesham Forest incident =

1980 UFO report in Suffolk, England

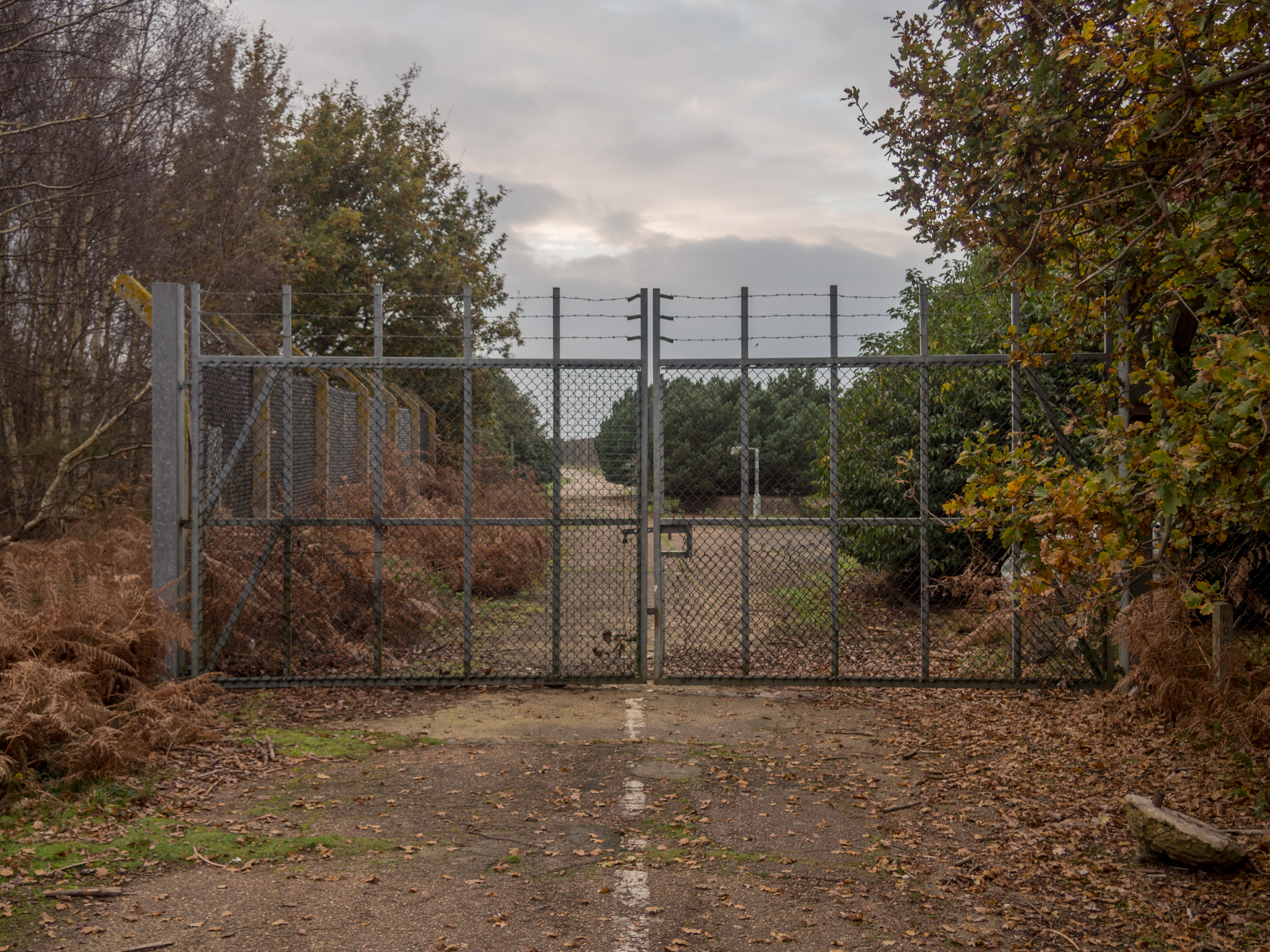
- Fence at the site of the former East Gate of RAF Woodbridge, where the incident began in December 1980. The original East Gate was much smaller.
- Date: 26 December and 28 December 1980
- Time: 03:00 GMT (23:00 EDT)
- Location: Suffolk, England; 52°05′20″N 01°26′57″E
- Also known as: Britain's Roswell

The Rendlesham Forest incident was a series of reported sightings of unexplained lights near Rendlesham Forest in Suffolk, England, in December 1980, which became linked with alleged UFO landings. The events occurred just outside RAF Woodbridge, which was used at the time by the United States Air Force (USAF). USAF personnel, including deputy base commander Lieutenant Colonel Charles I. Halt, claimed to have seen things he described as a UFO.

The occurrence is the most famous of alleged UFO events to have happened in the United Kingdom. It has been compared to the Roswell UFO incident in the United States and is sometimes called "Britain's Roswell".

The UK Ministry of Defence has stated that the event posed no threat to national security and was therefore never investigated as a security matter. Sceptics have explained the sightings as a misinterpretation of a series of nocturnal lights: a fireball, the Orfordness Lighthouse, and bright stars.

== Main events ==
=== 26 December ===
Around 03:00 on 26 December 1980 (reported as 27 December by Halt in his memo to the UK Ministry of Defence) a security patrol near the east gate of RAF Woodbridge saw lights apparently descending into nearby Rendlesham Forest. These lights have been attributed by astronomers to a piece of natural debris seen burning up as a fireball over southern England around that time. Servicemen initially thought it was a downed aircraft. According to Halt's memo, upon entering the forest to investigate, they witnessed a glowing object that was metallic in appearance with coloured lights. As they attempted to approach the object, it appeared to move through the trees, and "the animals on a nearby farm went into a frenzy". One of the servicemen, Sergeant Jim Penniston, later claimed to have encountered a "craft of unknown origin" while in the forest, although there was no publicised mention of this at the time and there is no corroboration from other witnesses. Penniston also described touching the encountered craft and finding it to be very warm to the touch.

Shortly after 04:00 local police were called to the scene but reported that the only lights they could see were those from the Orford Ness lighthouse, some miles away on the coast.

After daybreak on the morning of 26 December, servicemen returned to a small clearing near the eastern edge of the forest and found three small impressions on the ground, as well as burn marks and broken branches on nearby trees. At 10:30 the local police were called out again, this time to see the impressions, which they thought could have been made by an animal. Georgina Bruni, in her book You Can't Tell the People, published a photograph of the supposed landing site taken on the morning after the first sighting.

=== 28 December ===
Halt visited the site with several servicemen in the early hours of 28 December 1980 (reported as 29 December by Halt). They took radiation readings in the triangle of depressions and in the surrounding area using an AN/PDR-27, a standard U.S. military radiation survey meter. Although they recorded 0.07 milliroentgens per hour, in other regions they detected 0.03 to 0.04 milliroentgens per hour, around the background level. Furthermore, they detected a similar small 'burst' over half a mile away from the presumed landing site. Halt verbally recorded the events on a micro-cassette recorder.

It was during this investigation that a flashing red light was seen across the field to the east, almost in line with a farmhouse, as the witnesses had seen on the first night. The Orford Ness lighthouse is visible further to the east in the same line of sight.

Later, according to Halt's memo, three star-like lights were seen in the sky, two to the north and one to the south, about 10 degrees above the horizon. Halt said that the brightest of these hovered for two to three hours and seemed to beam down a stream of light from time to time. Astronomers have explained these star-like lights as bright stars.

== Location ==
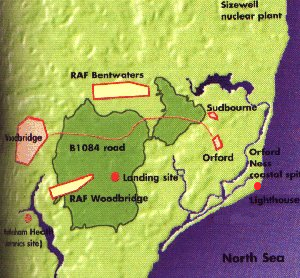
Map of local area

Rendlesham Forest is owned by the Forestry Commission and consists of about 5.8 square miles (15 km^{2}) of coniferous plantations, interspersed with broadleaved belts, heathland and wetland areas. It is located in the county of Suffolk, about 8 miles (13 km) east of the town of Ipswich. The incident occurred in the vicinity of two former military bases: RAF Bentwaters, which is just to the north of the forest, and RAF Woodbridge which extends into the forest from the west and is bounded by the forest on its northern and eastern edges. At the time, both were being used by the United States Air Force and were under the command of wing commander Colonel Gordon E. Williams. The base commander was Colonel Ted Conrad, and his deputy was Lieutenant Colonel Charles I. Halt.

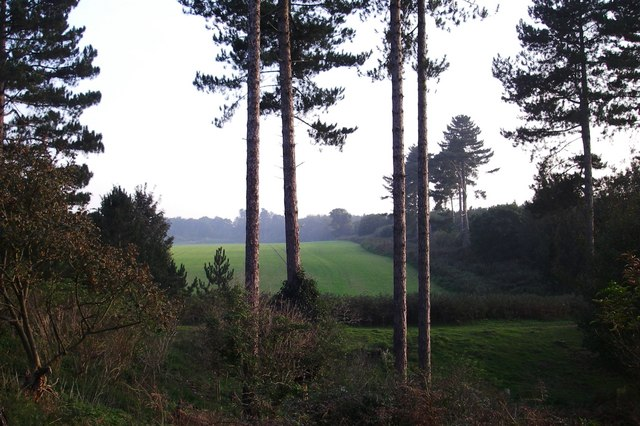
A photograph of the supposed landing site

The main events of the incident, including the supposed landing or landings, took place in the forest, which starts at the east end of the base runway or about 0.3 miles (0.5 km) to the east of the East Gate of RAF Woodbridge, from where security guards first noticed mysterious lights appearing to descend into the forest. The forest extends east about one mile (1.6 km) beyond East Gate, ending at a farmer's field at Capel Green, where additional events allegedly took place.

Orfordness Lighthouse, which sceptics identify as the flashing light seen off to the coast by the airmen, is along the same line of sight about 5 miles (8.0 km) further east of the forest's edge. At that time it was one of the brightest lighthouses in the UK.

== Analysis ==
One proposed theory is that the incident was a hoax. The BBC reported that a former U.S. security policeman, Kevin Conde, claimed responsibility for creating strange lights in the forest by driving around in a police vehicle whose lights he had modified. However, there is no evidence that this prank took place on the nights in question.

Other explanations for the incident have included a downed Soviet spy satellite, but no evidence has been produced to support this.

The most widely accepted explanation is that the sightings were due to a combination of three main factors. The initial sighting at 03.00 on 26 December, when the airmen saw something apparently descending into the forest, coincided with the appearance of a bright fireball over southern England, and such fireballs are a common source of UFO reports. The supposed landing marks were identified by police and foresters as rabbit diggings. No evidence has emerged to confirm that anything actually came down in the forest.

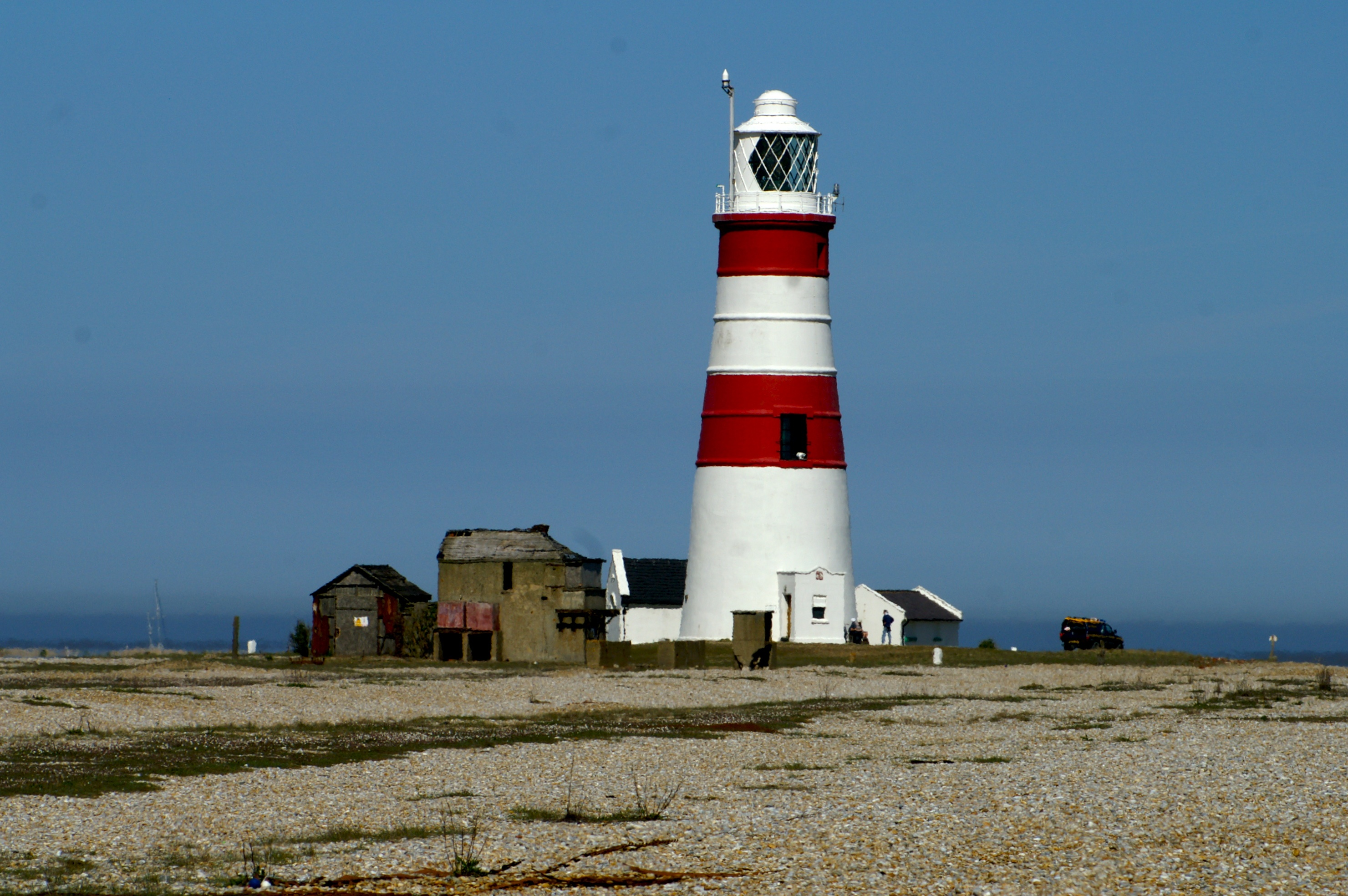
The Orfordness Lighthouse as seen from the south-west. A white shield blocked the light from the town of Orford but not from the forest where the sighting occurred.

According to the witness statements from 26 December, the flashing light seen from the forest lay in the same direction as the Orfordness Lighthouse. When the eyewitnesses attempted to approach the light they realised it was further off than they had thought. John Burroughs said that they "followed it for about 2 miles before we could see it was coming from a lighthouse", with Ed Cabansag agreeing that once they had reached a suitable vantage point they could see that it was "only a beacon light off in the distance".

Timings on Halt's tape recording during his sighting on 28 December indicate that the light he saw, which lay in the same direction as the light seen two nights earlier, flashed every five seconds, which was the flash rate of the Orfordness Lighthouse.

The star-like objects that Halt reported hovering low to the north and south are thought by some sceptics to have been misinterpretations of bright stars distorted by atmospheric and optical effects, another common source of UFO reports. The brightest of them, to the south, matched the position of Sirius, the brightest star in the night sky.

In his 6 January 2009 Skeptoid podcast episode titled "The Rendlesham Forest UFO," scientific sceptic author Brian Dunning evaluated the original eye-witness reports and audio recordings, as well as the resulting media reporting of this incident. Dunning concluded that everything Halt had reported had a simple explanation, saying that "When you examine each piece of evidence separately on its own merit, you avoid the trap of pattern matching and finding correlations where none exist. The meteors had nothing to do with the lighthouse or the rabbit diggings, but when you hear all three stories told together, it's easy to conclude (as did the airmen) that the light overhead became an alien spacecraft in the forest. Always remember: Separate pieces of poor evidence don't aggregate together into a single piece of good evidence."

In 2010 Jenny Randles, who in 1981 reported the case in the London Evening Standard and co-authored the first book on the case, Sky Crash: A Cosmic Conspiracy, emphasised her previously expressed doubts that the incident was caused by extraterrestrial visitors. Whilst suggesting that a UFO might have been involved, she noted: "Whilst some puzzles remain, we can probably say that no unearthly craft were seen in Rendlesham Forest. We can also argue with confidence that the main focus of the events was a series of misperceptions of everyday things encountered in less than everyday circumstances."

== UFO Trail ==
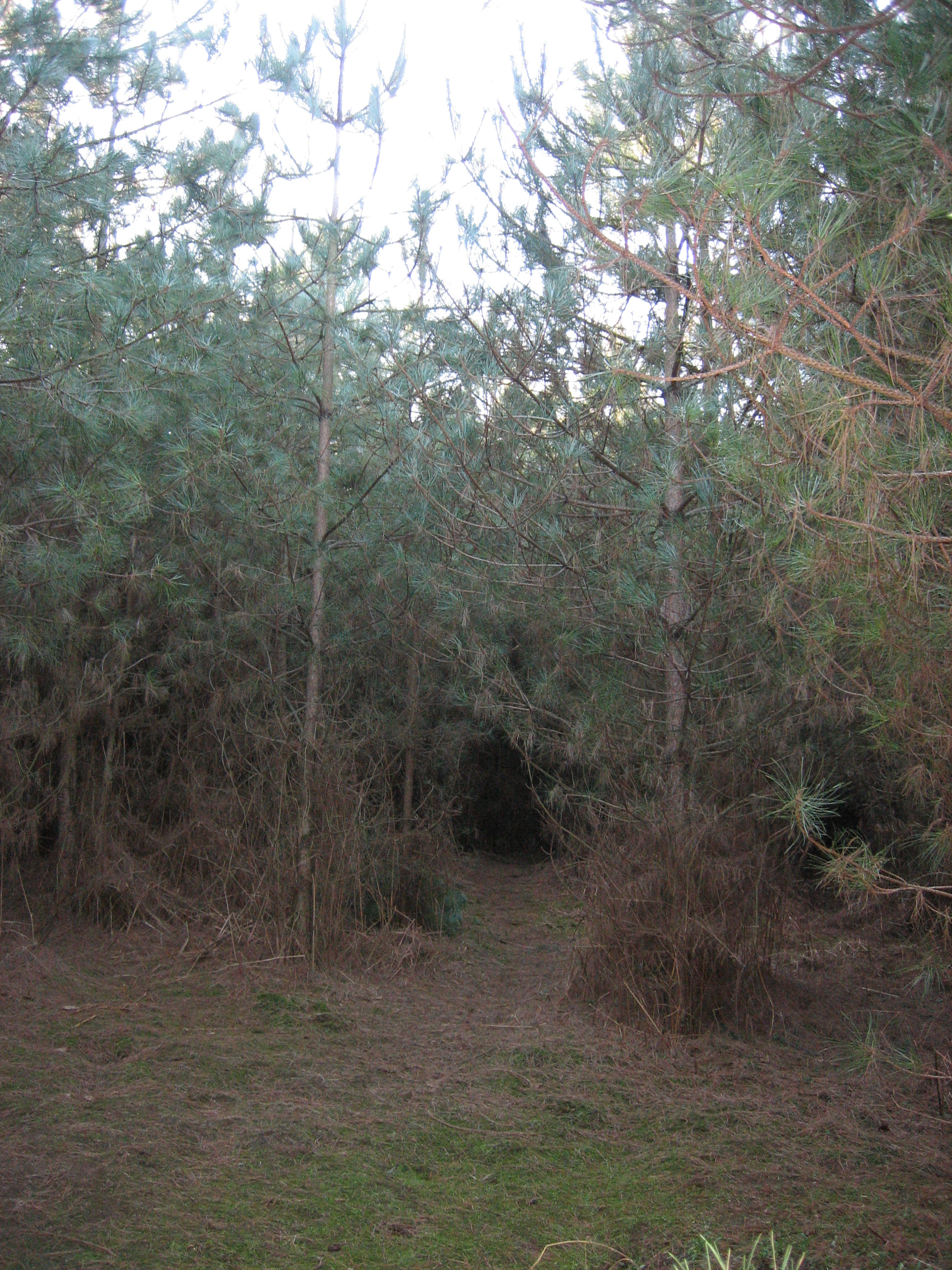
Forest clearing in the UFO Trail at Rendlesham Forest

In 2005, the Forestry Commission used Lottery proceeds to create a trail in Rendlesham Forest because of public interest and nicknamed it the UFO Trail. In 2014, the Forestry Service commissioned an artist to create a work which has been installed at the end of the trail. The artist states the piece is modelled on sketches that purportedly represent some versions of the UFO claimed to have been seen at Rendlesham.

== See also ==
- Lakenheath-Bentwaters incident
- List of reported UFO sightings
- Paulding Light
- The Rendlesham UFO Incident, a 2014 film based on these events
- UFO conspiracy theory
- UFO sightings in United Kingdom
- Unidentified flying object
