= May 1946 =

Month of 1946

| << | May 1946 | | | | | >> |
| Su | Mo | Tu | We | Th | Fr | Sa |
| | | | 1 | 2 | 3 | 4 |
| 5 | 6 | 7 | 8 | 9 | 10 | 11 |
| 12 | 13 | 14 | 15 | 16 | 17 | 18 |
| 19 | 20 | 21 | 22 | 23 | 24 | 25 |
| 26 | 27 | 28 | 29 | 30 | 31 |

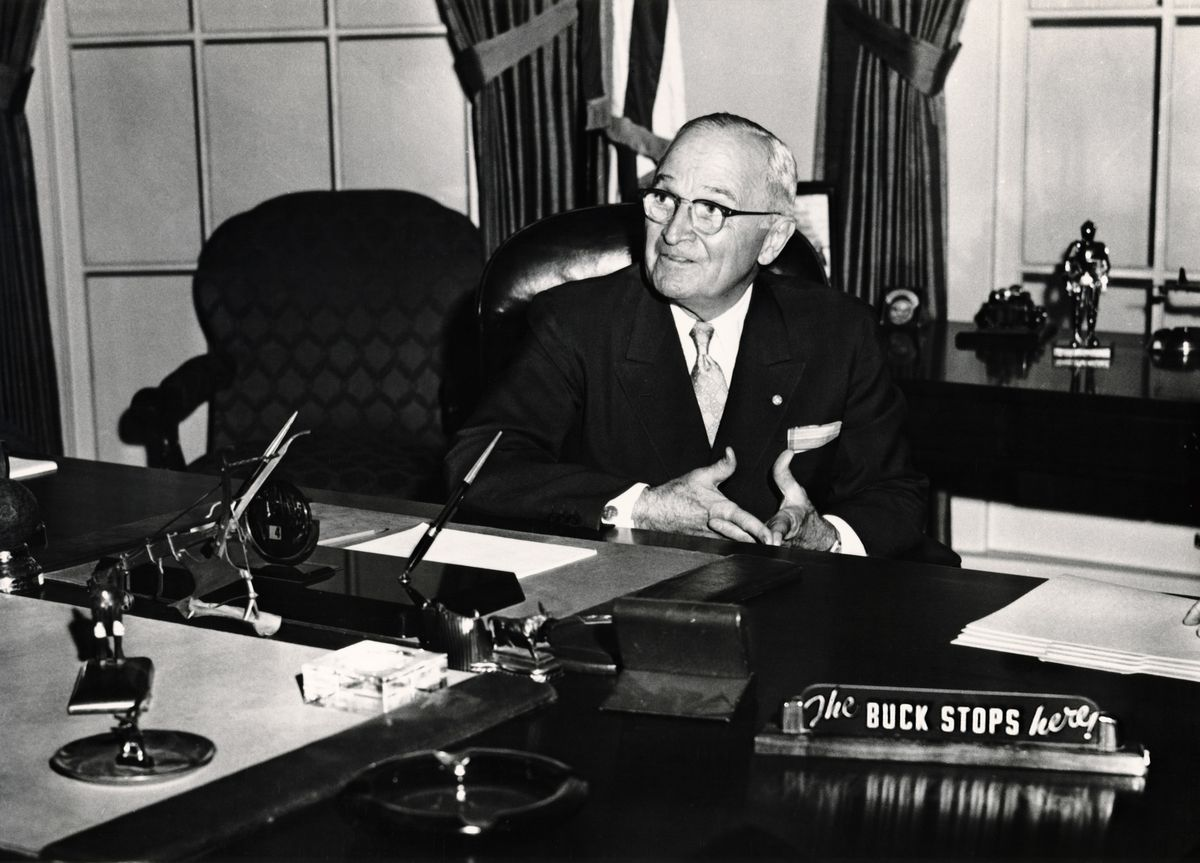
May 25, 1946: Truman comes within three minutes of ordering U.S. Army to seize America's railroads

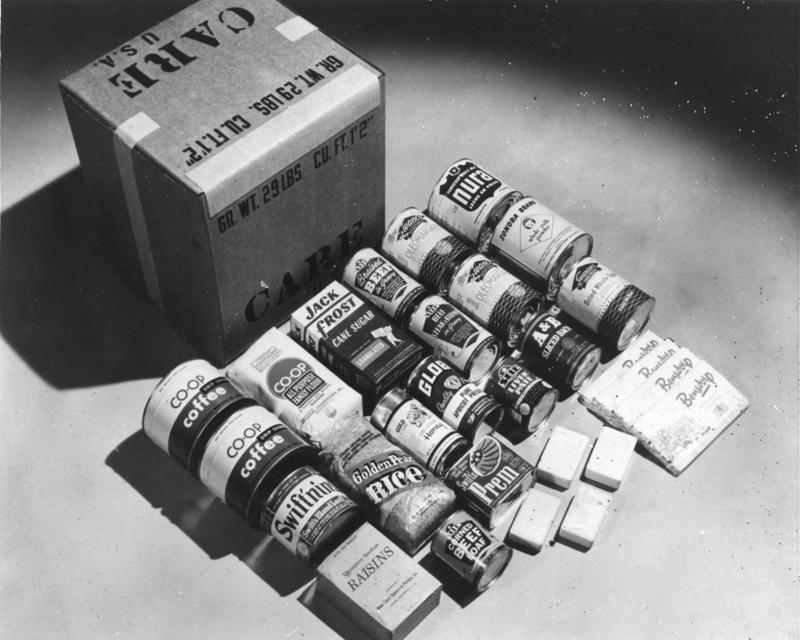
May 11, 1946: The first "CARE Package" is delivered

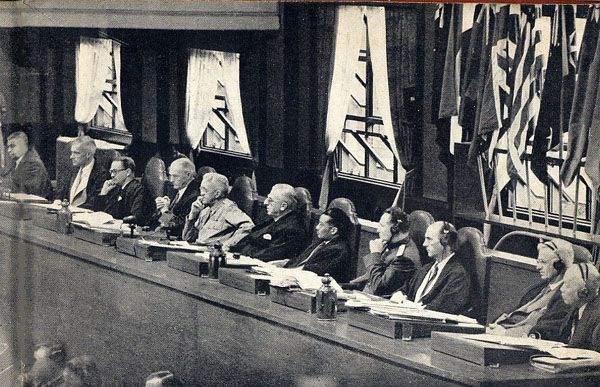
May 3, 1946: Tokyo War Crimes Tribunal opens

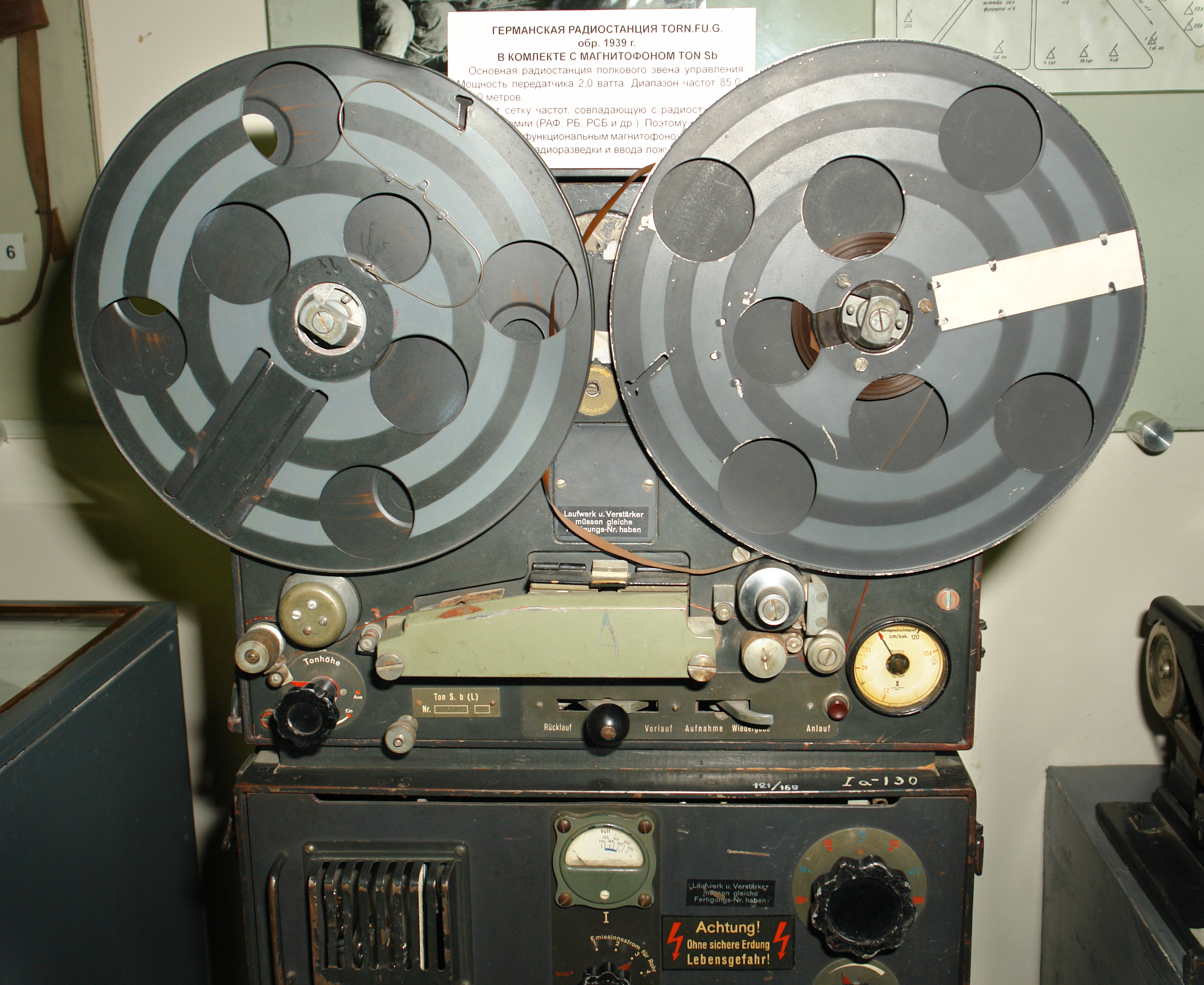
May 16, 1946: The original "tape" recorder, the hi-fidelity Magnetophon, is first demonstrated

The following events occurred in May 1946:

== May 1, 1946 (Wednesday) ==
- At least 800 Indigenous Australian pastoral workers walked off the job in Northwest Western Australia, starting one of the longest industrial strikes in Australia.
- Born:
  - John Woo (Wu Yu-seng), Hong Kong and U.S. action film director known for Face/Off (1997) and Red Cliff (2008); in Guangzhou,Republic of China.
  - Joanna Lumley, English television and stage actress known for Absolutely Fabulous; in Srinagar in British India
  - Lesley Gore, American rock singer known for "It's My Party"; as Lesley Sue Goldstein in New York City (d. 2015)
- Died: Bill Johnston, 61, American tennis player who was the U.S. champion 1915 and 1919, and winner of Wimbledon in 1923

== May 2, 1946 (Thursday) ==
- Douglas Aircraft Company, Inc., completed an engineering study on the feasibility of designing a human-carrying satellite. The study showed that if a vehicle could be accelerated to a speed of 27,360 kilometres per hour (17,000 mph) and aimed properly it would revolve on a circular orbit above the Earth's atmosphere as a new satellite. Such a vehicle would make a complete circuit of the Earth approximately every hour and a half. However, it would not pass over the same ground stations on successive circuits because the Earth would make about a one-sixteenth turn for each circuit of the satellite. Two fuels were considered in the study: hydrogen-oxygen and alcohol-oxygen. The liquid alcohol-hydrogen had been used to propel the German V-2 rockets. The use of either fuel to orbit an artificial satellite, the study showed, would require the use of a multistage vehicle. The study also indicated that maximum acceleration and temperatures could be kept within limits safe for humans. The vehicle envisioned would be used in obtaining scientific information on cosmic rays, gravitation, geophysics, terrestrial magnetism, astronomy, and meteorology.
- Six inmates unsuccessfully tried to escape from Alcatraz Prison, leading to a riot later recalled as the so-called "Battle of Alcatraz".
- The drama film noir The Postman Always Rings Twice starring Lana Turner and John Garfield was released.

== May 3, 1946 (Friday) ==
- The Tokyo War Crimes Tribunal began the trial of Japanese military and political leaders for war crimes.
- In Paris, at the Luxembourg Palace, the Council of Foreign Ministers debated the Italian peace treaty and Italy's border with Yugoslavia, in the presence of the two countries’ delegations, led by the Prime Ministers Alcide De Gasperi and Edvard Kardelj. Kardelj asked for Trieste’s annexation to Yugoslavia, while De Gasperi defended the Italian character of the Julian March.
- Willie Francis, 17, was strapped into the electric chair, awaiting execution at St. Martinville, Louisiana, but got only a mild shock when the circuits failed. Francis had been convicted of the murder of a local pharmacist. After the chair was repaired, Francis's execution was rescheduled for May 9, but Lieutenant Governor Emile Verret used his power as acting governor to grant a stay of execution. Francis would eventually be executed on May 9, 1947.

== May 4, 1946 (Saturday) ==
- Despite being the leader of the party that won the 1946 Japanese general election, Ichirō Hatoyama was barred from becoming Prime Minister of Japan, after the American occupational authority vetoed the choice. Shigeru Yoshida became prime minister instead.
- In Rome, the third congress of the Italian Liberal Party ended; concerning the institutional referendum, the Party declared itself favorable to the maintenance of monarchy.
- Born: Enrico Oldoini, Italian director; In La Spezia (d. 2023)

== May 5, 1946 (Sunday) ==
- In Italy, the SISAL football pools gambling system was launched; the first winner was the clerk Emilio Blasetti, who won 463,846 liras. In the following decades, SISAL (renamed Totocalcio) would become the most popular Italian betting pool and a social phenomenon.
- Voters in France rejected the proposed constitution for the Fourth Republic. Another vote, boycotted by millions, would be taken on October 13, and a new draft would be approved.
- Mariano Ospina Pérez was elected President of Colombia, defeating Jorge Gaitan. The later assassination of Gaitan precipitated "La Violencia", in which thousands of people would be killed.
- Stan Laurel was married for the fifth time, to the actress Ida Kitaeva.

== May 6, 1946 (Monday) ==
- American Zuni and Navajo veterans of World War II were denied in their attempts to register to vote in the 1946 general elections in New Mexico. The county clerk of McKinley County rejected their applications, citing a provision in the state constitution that denied the right of suffrage to "Indians not taxed", referring to Native Americans who lived on federal reservations. The applicants challenged the provision, and on August 3, 1948, a federal court ruled that the New Mexico constitutional provision violated the United States Constitution. The 1948 general election marked the first time that residents of New Mexico's Indian reservations were allowed to vote.
- LIFE Magazine published "Bedlam 1946: Most U.S. Mental Hospitals are a Shame and a Disgrace" in its May 6, 1946, issue. Albert Q. Maisel's exposé of the atrocities at two mental institutions, in Ohio and Pennsylvania, which he described as "concentration camps masquerading as hospitals", spurred reforms in psychiatric care.
- Curly Howard, the bald member of The Three Stooges, suffered a stroke on the final day of filming of Half-Wits Holiday and retired at age 42.

== May 7, 1946 (Tuesday) ==
- Tokyo Telecommunications Engineering (Tokyo Tsushin Kogyo or Totsuko) was founded by Masaru Ibuka and Akio Morita, who started with only 20 employees and built the company into one of the world's largest electronics manufacturers. In 1955, the company renamed itself Sony.
- Born:
  - Thelma Houston, American pop singer known for "Don't Leave Me This Way"; in Leland, Mississippi
  - Michael Rosen, English author and poet; in Harrow, London

== May 8, 1946 (Wednesday) ==
- For the first time, the United States invited the rest of the world's nations to watch nuclear testing, bringing eleven other member nations of the United Nations Atomic Energy Commission to view Operation Crossroads in July. The Soviet Union, United Kingdom, France, China, Canada, Australia, Brazil, Egypt, Poland, the Netherlands and Mexico were afforded the chance to send government and press representatives as witnesses.
- The Chief of Naval Operations directed the U.S. Navy's Bureau of Aeronautics to make preliminary investigations in the field of earth satellite vehicles.

== May 9, 1946 (Thursday) ==
King Victor Emmanuel III

- Hour Glass, considered the first network television entertainment show, premiered at 8:00 p.m. on WNBT-TV in New York City. The program, described by Tim Brooks and Earle Marsh as "one of the most important pioneers in the early history of television", By November, the show was telecast on the NBC television network, which consisted of three stations (New York, Philadelphia and Schenectady).
- King Victor Emmanuel III of Italy abdicated, and was succeeded by his son Umberto II.
- Born:
  - Candice Bergen, American film and television actress and comedian known for the TV series Murphy Brown, and daughter of radio comedian and ventriloquist Edgar Bergen and model Frances Westerman Bergen; in Beverly Hills, California

  - Drafi Deutscher, German Schlager music singer; in Charlottenburg, West Berlin (d. 2006)

== May 10, 1946 (Friday) ==
- Two naval airplanes collided during a training mission at the Pensacola Naval Air Station, killing 28 U.S. Navy airmen. The two PB-4Y planes were practicing evasive maneuvers with an F6F Hellcat fighter and crashed into a wooded area eight miles north of the town of Munson in Santa Rosa County, Florida.
- An American-launched V-2 rocket reached a record high altitude, soaring 75 miles (121 km) above the White Sands, New Mexico, proving grounds. Prior to the flight, a man from Dorchester, Massachusetts, had volunteered to ride inside the nose cone of the reassembled German missile, and the U.S. Army politely declined his offer to become the first astronaut in history. "Experts said that there was room in a V-2 for a human being and he probably could survive the 3,500 mile an hour top speed," noted a report, "but added there was no known means of escaping alive before the rocket crashed to earth."
- Born:
  - Donovan Leitch, Scottish rock musician ("Mellow Yellow"); in Maryhill
  - Dave Mason, English rock musician, Traffic ("We Just Disagree"); in Worcester
  - Maureen Lipman, British actress; in Hull

== May 11, 1946 (Saturday) ==
- Sixty-one SS members, who had carried out exterminations at the Mauthausen concentration camp at Dachau, were convicted of murdering 70,000 people, mostly Jewish. Forty-nine of them were executed, and the other 12 released from prison by 1951.
- The first 20,000 "CARE Packages", each with almost 20 pounds (9.1 kg) of food, were delivered to people in need, as a ship unloaded the materials at the French port of Le Havre. Under the charity program, an individual could pay for a CARE Package to be delivered elsewhere in the world. The phrase "care package" would become a generic term for sending necessary items to someone in need. CARE originally stood for "Cooperative for American Remittances to Europe", and later for "Cooperative for Assistance and Relief Everywhere".
- Born: Robert Jarvik, American physicist and artificial heart inventor; in Midland, Michigan

== May 12, 1946 (Sunday) ==
- The Newfoundland Herald published its first issue, originally as The Sunday Herald, founded by Geoffrey Sterling.
- The U.S. Army Air Forces' Project RAND filed a report entitled "Preliminary Design of an Experimental World-Circling Spaceship," which indicated the technical feasibility of building and launching an artificial satellite.
- Born: Richard Bruce Silverman, American chemist and developer of Pregabalin (Lyrica), treatment for fibromyalgia; in Philadelphia

== May 13, 1946 (Monday) ==
- The Soviet ballistic missile program was formally created by a top secret decree (No. 1017-419ss) signed by Joseph Stalin, and Minister of Armaments Dmitriy Ustinov was made overseer of the project.
- The Federal Airport Act was signed into law by U.S. President Harry S Truman, providing for 500 million dollars in federal grants for civilian airport projects across the United States over a seven-year period.
- With U.S. coal supplies dwindling, striking American coal miners returned to work for two weeks on the orders of United Mine Workers President John L. Lewis, who said that the walkout would start anew if negotiations on a new labor contract failed.

== May 14, 1946 (Tuesday) ==
- Nueces County, Texas, including Corpus Christi, was quarantined to prevent the spread of a "polio-like disease" that had broken out in Corpus Christi and San Antonio. In addition to the closing of all schools, churches, theaters, and parks, the roads leading into and out of Nueces County were blocked by 300 members of the Texas National Guard, and nobody under 21 was allowed in. Buses and trains were "sprayed with DDT", with the pesticide being used as a disinfectant.

== May 15, 1946 (Wednesday) ==
- The USCG Eagle, later known as "America's Tall Ship", was commissioned as a training vessel for the United States Coast Guard. The only active American sail-powered vessel had been built in 1936 for the German Navy as the Horst Wessel, and was captured in World War II.

== May 16, 1946 (Thursday) ==
- The musical Annie Get Your Gun, starring Ethel Merman as Annie Oakley, premiered on Broadway, at the Imperial Theatre. Written by Irving Berlin, the show introduced the hit songs "There's No Business Like Show Business", "Anything You Can Do (I Can Do Better)", "I Got the Sun in the Mornin' (and the Moon at Night)", and "The Girl That I Marry", and ran for 1,159 performances.
- British Prime Minister Clement Attlee informed the House of Commons that the Cabinet Mission had rejected the Muslim League proposal for an independent State of Pakistan. The six-point plan for a Federal Union of India included a provision that legislation would have to be approved by a majority of both the Hindu legislators and the Muslim legislators.
- A Viking Transport DC-3 airliner en route from Newark to Atlanta crashed while attempting a landing at Richmond, killing all 27 people on board.
- At the Institute of Radio Engineers convention in San Francisco, Major Jack Mullin of the U.S. Army Signal Corps, demonstrated the Magnetophon and its magnetic recording tape, which he had found in Germany following the Allied victory in World War II. The high fidelity system had never been heard in the United States, and with Mullin as a consultant, the Ampex company developed the first American audiotape recording systems.

== May 17, 1946 (Friday) ==
- A U.S. Army C-47 airplane with 12 persons, and the remains of 41 U.S. servicemen, crashed while en route from Rangoon (Yangon) to Calcutta (Kolkata). The wreckage, located somewhere in modern-day Bangladesh, has never been found.
- The Bell X-1 supersonic jet aircraft was shown to the general public for the first time, at an exhibition at Wright Field.
- Died: William Jefferson Blythe, Jr., 36, in an automobile accident near Sikeston, Missouri. Blythe died three months before the birth of his son, who would be named William Jefferson Blythe III, and who would, in 1993, become Bill Clinton, the 42nd President of the United States.

== May 18, 1946 (Saturday) ==
- Minutes before the scheduled 4:00 p.m. railroad strike across the United States, President Truman announced that the Brotherhood of Railroad Trainmen and the Brotherhood of Locomotive Engineers had agreed to postpone the walkout for five days.
- According to Swedish athlete Gösta Carlsson, he was visited on this date by aliens from outer space, who landed their craft at a forest clearing near Kronoskogen, and gave him information about natural remedies, which he used to found two successful companies. The UFO-Memorial Ängelholm was erected at the site in 1963 and is a tourist attraction.
- "Laughing on the Outside (Crying on the Inside)" by Dinah Shore hit #1 on the Billboard Honor Roll of Hits.
- Born: Reggie Jackson, American MLB player 1967–1987 and Baseball Hall of Fame inductee; in Wyncote, Pennsylvania

== May 19, 1946 (Sunday) ==
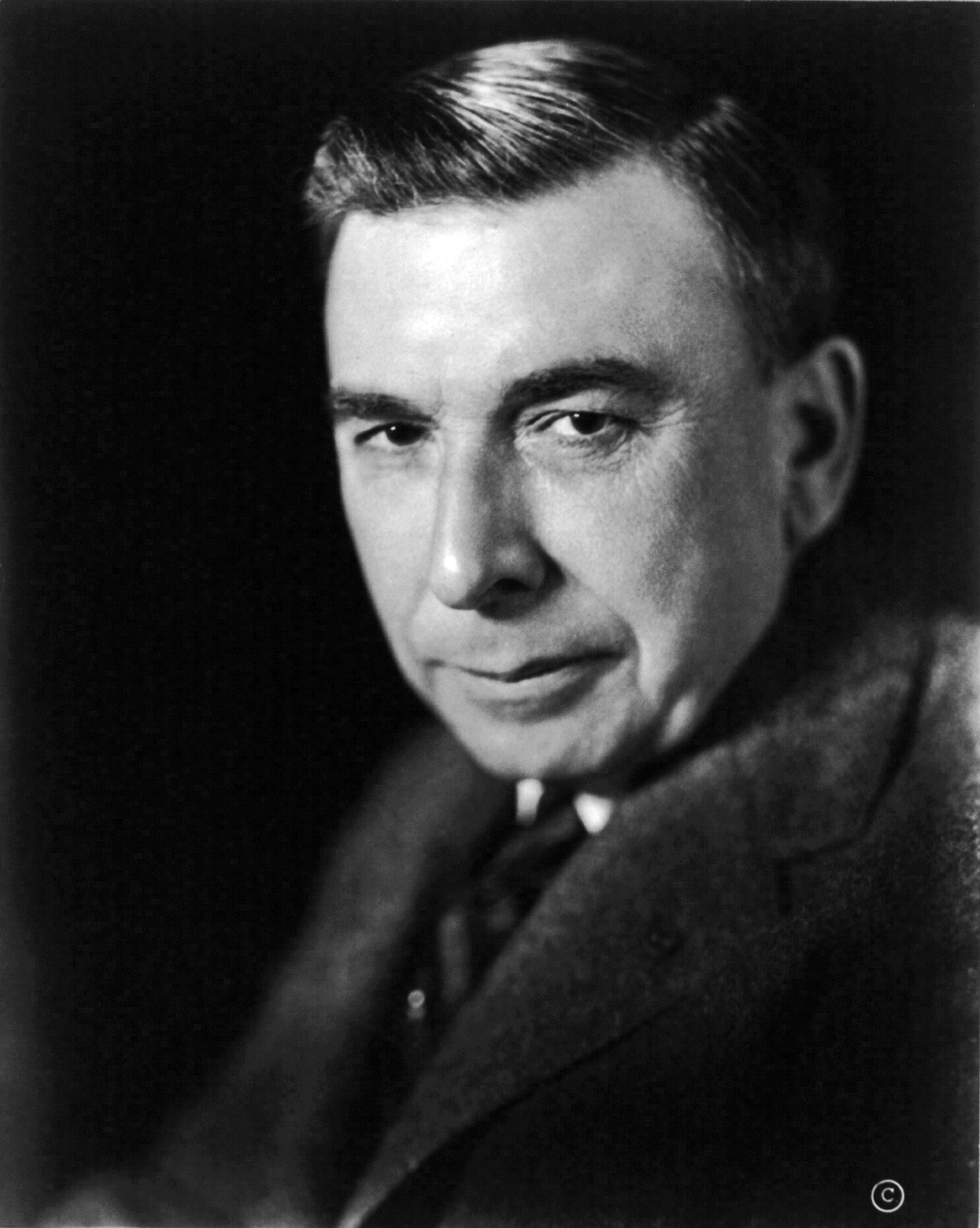
Tarkington

- The "People's Rally for Obtaining Food" took place in Tokyo, as hundreds of thousands of demonstrators protested against food shortages and against the government of Japan's prime minister, Shigeru Yoshida.
- The city of Guadalupe, California, was incorporated.
- Born: André the Giant, French professional wrestler; as André Roussimoff, in Grenoble (d. 1993)
- Died: Booth Tarkington, 76, American novelist

== May 20, 1946 (Monday) ==
- By a vote of 324 to 143, the British House of Commons passed a bill to nationalize the United Kingdom's coal mining industry. The measure was then approved by the House of Lords and received royal assent on July 12.
- A U.S. Army C-45 transport plane crashed into the 58th floor of the 70-story Bank of Manhattan building on Wall Street, killing all five persons aboard. The accident happened at eight in the evening, and most of the 5,000 persons who normally would have been in the building had left for the day.
- Born:
  - Cher, American actress and rock singer; as Cherilyn Sarkisian, in El Centro, California
  - Bobby Murcer, American baseball player and broadcaster; in Oklahoma City (d. 2008)
- Died: Jacob Ellehammer, 74, Danish inventor

== May 21, 1946 (Tuesday) ==
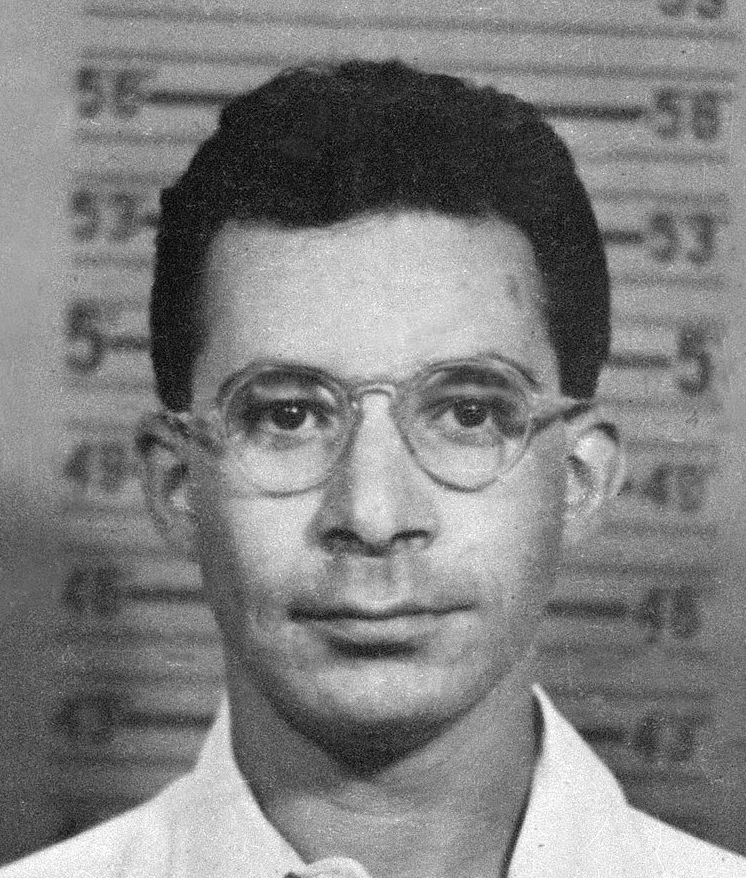
Louis Slotin

- Dr. Louis Slotin, a physicist at the Los Alamos research center, was fatally injured during an experiment with a "subcritical nuclear assembly", a plutonium core and two halves of a beryllium sphere. The purpose was to measure the increase in radiation as the two hemispheres (which deflected neutrons back into the plutonium) were moved closer together. At 3:20 pm, the screwdriver slipped and the two beryllium pieces came together, causing a critical reaction. Slotin knocked the halves apart, saving the other seven men in the room, while absorbing a lethal dose of radiation that a radiologist described as a "3-D sunburn" to all the cells of his body. Slotin died nine days later.

== May 22, 1946 (Wednesday) ==
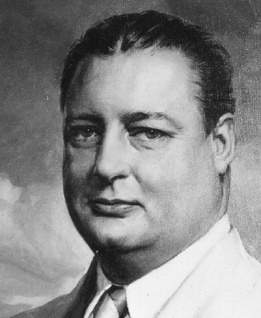
Krug

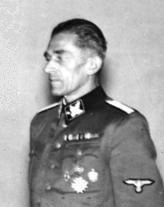
Frank

- At 12:01 a.m., all United States bituminous coal mines whose workers were on strike were seized by the federal government and placed under the operation of the U.S. Department of the Interior and its secretary, Julius A. Krug. President Truman had issued Executive Order 9278 at 3:00 the afternoon before.
- The Culinary Institute of America was founded in the U.S. by Frances Roth and Katharine Cramer Angell, initially as the New Haven Restaurant Institute in New Haven, Connecticut.
- Born: George Best, Northern Irish footballer; in Belfast (d. 2005)
- Died: Karl Hermann Frank, 48, Nazi SS leader who oversaw the massacres at Lidice and Ležáky, was hanged in Prague.

== May 23, 1946 (Thursday) ==
- At 4 p.m., thousands of railroad workers in the Eastern Time Zone of the United States walked off of their jobs. Hour by hour, as 4 o'clock arrived in the rest of the nation, laborers walked off of their jobs. By 7 pm EST, the 227,000 miles of American railroads were tied up. In addition to the halt of freight shipments, millions of travelers were stranded in what was described as "the most crippling work stoppage the nation ever suffered",
- The first issue of the weekly news magazine World Report, created by publisher David Lawrence as a complement to his weekly newspaper United States News, was published. Beginning on January 16, 1948, the two publications would be combined into one weekly magazine, U.S. News & World Report.
- Chick-fil-A, a U.S. chain of restaurants known originally for their chicken fillet sandwiches, was founded by S. Truett Cathy with the opening of his Dwarf Grill 24-hour diner in Hapeville, Georgia, a suburb of Atlanta. Mr. Cathy would expand his chicken restaurant chain by opening the first restaurant with the name "Chick-fil-A" on November 24, 1967, in Atlanta’s Greenbriar Mall and the chain remained limited to indoor shopping malls until inaugurating a stand-alone location in 1986.

== May 24, 1946 (Friday) ==
- At 9 pm Eastern Time, U.S. President Harry S. Truman made a nationwide radio address regarding the railway strike, and delivered an ultimatum: "If sufficient workers to operate the trains have not returned, by 4 p.m. tomorrow, as head of our government, I have no alternative but to operate the trains by using every means within my power ... I shall ask our armed forces to furnish protection to every man who heeds the call of his country in this hour of need." Having set a deadline of 19 hours for action, Truman closed by saying that he would address a joint session of Congress the next day at 4.
- Thailand was invaded at dawn by 800 soldiers of the French Army, who crossed the Mekong River from Laos, at that time part of French Indo-China. The troops from France were supported by planes and artillery, and clashed with local forces while pursuing Communist rebels.
- An unidentified U.S. Congressman on the House Appropriations Committee told a reporter of a biological weapon that "can wipe out all form of life in a large city", describing a "germ proposition" that would be sprayed from airplanes to deliver "quick and certain death".

== May 25, 1946 (Saturday) ==
Flag of the Kingdom of Transjordan

- In a 14-minute ceremony at Amman, the Hashemite Kingdom of Jordan (referred to as the Kingdom of Transjordan until 1949) won its full independence from the United Kingdom. Before a crowd of 300,000 witnesses, the Emir Abdullah became the nation's King.
- With only three minutes left before the United States Army would seize control of the nation's railroads, the leaders of both striking railway workers' unions signed a settlement at the White House. With soldiers in place and a deadline of 4 pm EST, a verbal agreement was reached at 3:50 and the written pact was signed at 3:57. Earlier in the day, the U.S. House of Representatives had approved President Truman's request for emergency legislation that would have allowed striking workers to be drafted into the U.S. armed forces.
- "The Gypsy" by The Ink Spots topped the Billboard Honor Roll of Hits.
- Died:
  - Patty Smith Hill, 78, pioneering American educator known for co-authoring (with her sister Mildred J. Hill) the melody and lyrics for "Happy Birthday to You", originally as "Good Morning to All"; she was also the first director of the Institute of Child Welfare Research at Columbia University.
  - Marcel Petiot, 49, French serial killer, was executed by guillotine

== May 26, 1946 (Sunday) ==
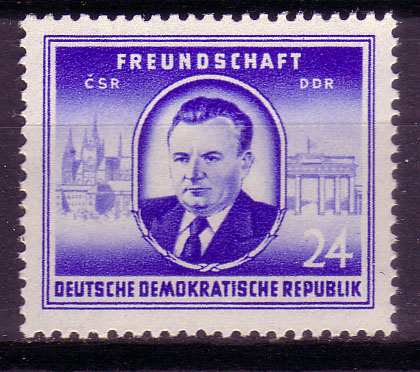
Gottwald

- In the first democratic elections since World War II in Czechoslovakia, the Communist Party, led by Klement Gottwald captured 114 of the 300 seats in Parliament. Gottwald became prime minister of a coalition government. In 1948, the Communist Party of Czechoslovakia would become the sole legal party.
- Vincent Pellicio, a 21-year-old prisoner in Mecklenburg County, Virginia, escaped from a road crew and would remain free for more than 40 years. At the time of his arrest on August 4, 1987, Pellicio was an electrician in Newhall, California. Returned to Virginia, Pellicio was pardoned later that month by Virginia Governor Gerald Baliles, "in view of his law-abiding behavior and commendable adjustment since his escape".

== May 27, 1946 (Monday) ==
- In Vietnam, the French colonial government created an administration for the minority Montagnard population, separate from the Vietnamese people, with the headquarters at Buôn Ma Thuột. A short-lived, autonomous Pays Montagnard du Sud followed in 1950.

== May 28, 1946 (Tuesday) ==
- The United States made a loan package to France for a record 1.37 billion dollars.
- In the first nighttime baseball game ever played at Yankee Stadium, a crowd of 49,917 watched the New York Yankees lose to the Washington Senators, 2–1.
- Born: Koyamparambath Satchidanandan, Indian Malayalam language poet; in Kerala
- Died: Carter Glass, 89, United States Senator (D-Virginia) since 1920 and oldest member of the U.S. Senate. Senator Glass had not appeared in Congress in almost four years after a stroke, but had been re-elected later in 1942. Even after he became incapacitated, his seat was never declared vacant.

== May 29, 1946 (Wednesday) ==
- The Minsk Tractor Works was founded in the Soviet Union at the capital of the Byelorussian SSR (now Belarus). The state-supported company became the world's largest manufacturer of farm tractors.

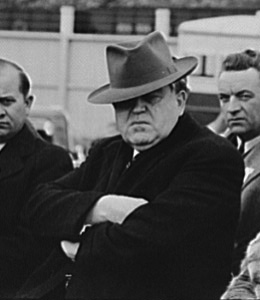
John L. Lewis

- After 45 days, the nationwide walkout of American bituminous coal miners ended, with the signing, at the White House, of a new contract by UMWA President John L. Lewis and U.S. Secretary of the Interior Krug. Lewis said that the nation's 400,000 soft coal miners would be back to work by June 2.
- Eddie Klep became the first white player in baseball's Negro leagues when he pitched seven innings for the Cleveland Buckeyes, in an 8–6 win over the Chicago American Giants in Grand Rapids, Michigan.
- Born: Fernando Buesa, Spanish Basque politician; in Bilbao (assassinated 2000)

== May 30, 1946 (Thursday) ==
- George Robson, who had never before finished first in a major auto race, won the Indianapolis 500, which was being run for the first time since 1941.
- The derailment of a train at Hengyang in China killed more than 90 passengers and injured 60 others. The group was in four coaches of a train traveling from Guangzhou (Canton) to Hankow.
- Born: Candy Lightner, American founder of Mothers Against Drunk Driving; in Pasadena, California

== May 31, 1946 (Friday) ==
- The Antonov Design Bureau was established at Novosibirsk to begin production of the Antonov series of Soviet civilian airplanes.
- An earthquake in the Muş Province of Turkey killed at least 255 people. The quake was centered at the village of Varto.
- London Heathrow Airport was officially opened for civilian use.
- The USS George A. Johnson was decommissioned in San Diego.
- The Japanese submarine I-401, described along with her sister ship I-400 as history's first "underwater aircraft carriers" and the largest non-nuclear submarines ever built, was sunk secretly near Hawaii by the submarine USS Cabezon (SS-334). I-401 was rediscovered on March 17, 2005. At 400 feet (122 m) long, the "Sensuikan Toku" class of subs were designed to carry three Aichi M6A1 Seiran bombers, each of which could be readied to fly once the submarine surfaced.
