= Hjärnarps GIF =

Swedish football club

- Full name: Hjärnarps Gymnastik-och Idrottsförening
- Founded: 1926
- Ground: Hjärnarps IP (Gögavallen); Hjärnarp; Sweden
- Capacity: 2,000
- Chairman: Kjell-Arne Nilsson
- Head coach: Göran Zentio
- Coach: Mr x
- League: Division 7 Skåne Nordvästra
- 2010: Division 7 Skåne Nordvästra, 5th
Home colours	Away colours

Hjärnarps GIF is a Swedish football club located in Hjärnarp in Ängelholm Municipality, Skåne County.

== Background ==
Hjärnarps Gymnastik-och Idrottsförening were founded in 1926 and currently have around 250 members and 17 teams.

Since their foundation Hjärnarps GIF has participated mainly in the middle and lower divisions of the Swedish football league system. The club currently plays in Division 7 Skåne Nordvästra which is the ninth tier of Swedish football. They play their home matches at the Hjärnarps IP in Hjärnarp.

Hjärnarps GIF are affiliated to the Skånes Fotbollförbund.

== Season to season ==
In their successful period in the 1970s and 1980s Hjärnarps GIF competed in the following divisions:

Season	Level	Division	Section	Position	Movements
1975	Tier 4	Division 4	Skåne Nordvästra	10th	
1976	Tier 4	Division 4	Skåne Nordvästra	8th	
1977	Tier 4	Division 4	Skåne Nordvästra	6th	
1978	Tier 4	Division 4	Skåne Nordvästra	6th	
1979	Tier 4	Division 4	Skåne Nordvästra	6th	
1980	Tier 4	Division 4	Skåne Nordvästra	6th	
1981	Tier 4	Division 4	Skåne Nordvästra	8th	
1982	Tier 4	Division 4	Skåne Nordvästra	6th	
1983	Tier 4	Division 4	Skåne Nordvästra	9th	
1984	Tier 4	Division 4	Skåne Nordvästra	2nd	
1985	Tier 4	Division 4	Skåne Nordvästra	7th	
1986	Tier 4	Division 4	Skåne Nordvästra	6th	

In recent seasons Hjärnarps GIF have competed in the following divisions:

Season	Level	Division	Section	Position	Movements
1999	Tier 6	Division 5	Skåne Nordvästra	9th	
2000	Tier 6	Division 5	Skåne Nordvästra	5th	
2001	Tier 6	Division 5	Skåne Nordvästra	10th	Relegation Playoffs
2002	Tier 6	Division 5	Skåne Nordvästra	10th	
2003	Tier 6	Division 5	Skåne Nordvästra A	12th	Relegated
2004	Tier 7	Division 6	Skåne Nordvästra A	1st	Promoted
2005	Tier 6	Division 5	Skåne Nordvästra	9th	Relegation Playoffs – Relegated
2006*	Tier 8	Division 6	Skåne Nordvästra A	8th	
2007	Tier 8	Division 6	Skåne Nordvästra A	6th	
2008	Tier 8	Division 6	Skåne Nordvästra	11th	Relegated
2009	Tier 9	Division 7	Skåne Nordvästra	7th	
2010	Tier 9	Division 7	Skåne Nordvästra	5th	
2011	Tier 9	Division 7	Skåne Nordvästra		

* League restructuring in 2006 resulted in a new division being created at Tier 3 and subsequent divisions dropping a level.
