= UFO-Memorial =

There are a number of memorials to alleged UFOs

- UFO-Memorial Ängelholm in Sweden
- Emilcin UFO memorial in Poland
- Robert Taylor incident#Ufologists, a plaque in Livingston, Scotland
