= Vejbystrand =

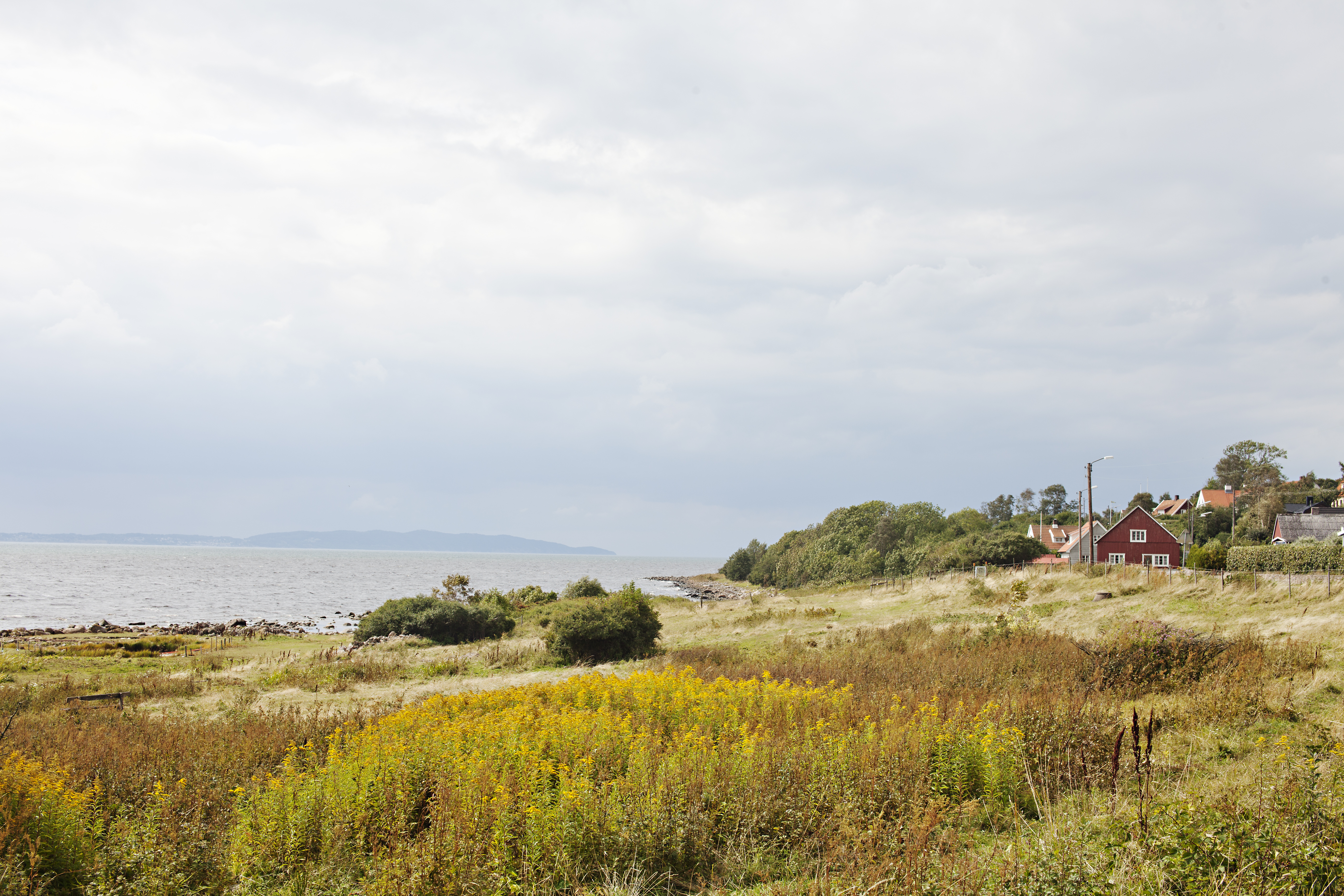

- Location within Skåne
- Coordinates: 56°19′N 12°46′E
- Country: Sweden
- Province: Skåne
- County: Skåne County
- Municipality: Ängelholm Municipality and Båstad Municipality

Area
  - Total: 2.74 km^{2} (1.06 sq mi)

Population (31 December 2010)
  - Total: 2,721
  - Density: 992/km^{2} (2,570/sq mi)
- Time zone: UTC+1 (CET)
  - Summer (DST): UTC+2 (CEST)

For Vejby Strand in Denmark, see Vejby, Gribskov Municipality

Vejbystrand was previously a bimunicipal locality situated in Skåne County, Sweden with 2,721 inhabitants in 2010. The majority of its population lived in Ängelholm Municipality and a minority in Båstad Municipality. It is included in Ängelholm from 2015 on.

The most famous building in Vejbystrand was the kitchen/admin building of Kronprinsessan Victorias kustsanatorium, built in 1903. The building was taken down in May 2010 and will be replaced by apartments. Throughout the early and middle twentieth century Vejbystrand was a popular spot for patients with lung disease, especially tuberculosis, as Vejbystrand was known for its clean air coming from the coast.

Vejbystrand is a popular vacation area for Swedes and people visiting Sweden. There is one hotel (Vejby Strand Hotel) and one hostel and also many summer houses for rent.
