= UFO sightings in Sweden =

List of alleged UFO sightings within the nation of Sweden

This is a list of alleged sightings of unidentified flying objects or UFOs in Sweden.

== 1944 ==
A Swedish man claims that when he was a schoolboy in 1944 or 1945, he and a friend witnessed a saucer-like object flying about only 5–10 m (16–33 ft) above the ground near a small village in Östergötland. The object was described as silver-coloured and producing a whizzing sound. It briefly stood still before flying above a hilltop where it again hovered motionless. It was at this point the object descended close to the ground. After the object subsequently ascended and disappeared, the witnesses examined the area of the hilltop where the event had occurred and found that it was burned and still glowing with embers.

== 1946 ==
- The "ghost rockets" were mysterious rocket or missile-shaped objects that were sighted on various occasions between May and December 1946, with peaks on 9 and 11 August 1946. They were seen primarily in Sweden and nearby Scandinavian countries, but also in other European countries as well. Some 2,000 reported sightings were logged altogether, 200 of them being on radar, and a number of fragments were reportedly found by military authorities.
- Ängelholm UFO: A businessman named Gösta Carlsson claimed that in May 1946, he witnessed a UFO land in the forest near Ängelholm and subsequently encountered the vehicle's crew of humanoid occupants.

== 1953 ==
An aeroplane pilot and his flight mechanic sighted a disc-shaped object approaching them at a very high speed while flying over Skåne in December 1953. The object was described as circular or slightly elliptical and about 10 m (33 ft) in diameter with a metallic or somewhat whitish colouration. The witnesses estimated that the object was flying at the speed of sound, and no flames or smoke trails from the object were observed. No other aeroplanes were in the area at the time of the sighting.

== 1957 ==
Two spheroid, silver-grey objects were seen flying at an altitude of about 200 m (660 ft) over northern Gotland. The objects were described as being about 25 m (82 ft) in diameter, having slowly rotating details and a constant red glow on the bottom surface. An examining expert of the Swedish military claimed that the objects were research balloons, but this conclusion has been called into question as the objects were observed moving in identical manoeuvres despite the lack of wind at the time of the observation.

== 1968 ==
In 1968, strange impressions were found on the ground in a remote area outside of Borås. The impressions were described as two triangular shapes which emitted a malodorous smell from an unknown fluid. One of the triangles had about 15 cm (5.9 in) marks in each corner. The fluid was examined by laboratory experts who could not identify it.

== 2009 ==
The 2009 Norwegian spiral anomaly was a spiral-shaped phenomenon that occurred over Norway and Sweden. The spiral consisted of a blue beam of light with a greyish spiral emanating from one end. The anomaly was seen in the northern areas of the country.

== 2015 ==
A flying saucer was sighted by eight witnesses in Stigsjö near Härnösand. The object approached the observers slowly at a height of about 300 m (980 ft). The object was described as round, 6–8 m (20–26 ft) in diameter, surrounded by a ring about 2 m (6 ft 7 in) wide, and emitting a reddish-yellow light from its underside. It was visible for about three minutes.

== See also ==
- List of reported UFO sightings
