= Tåstarp Church =

- Tåstarps kyrka
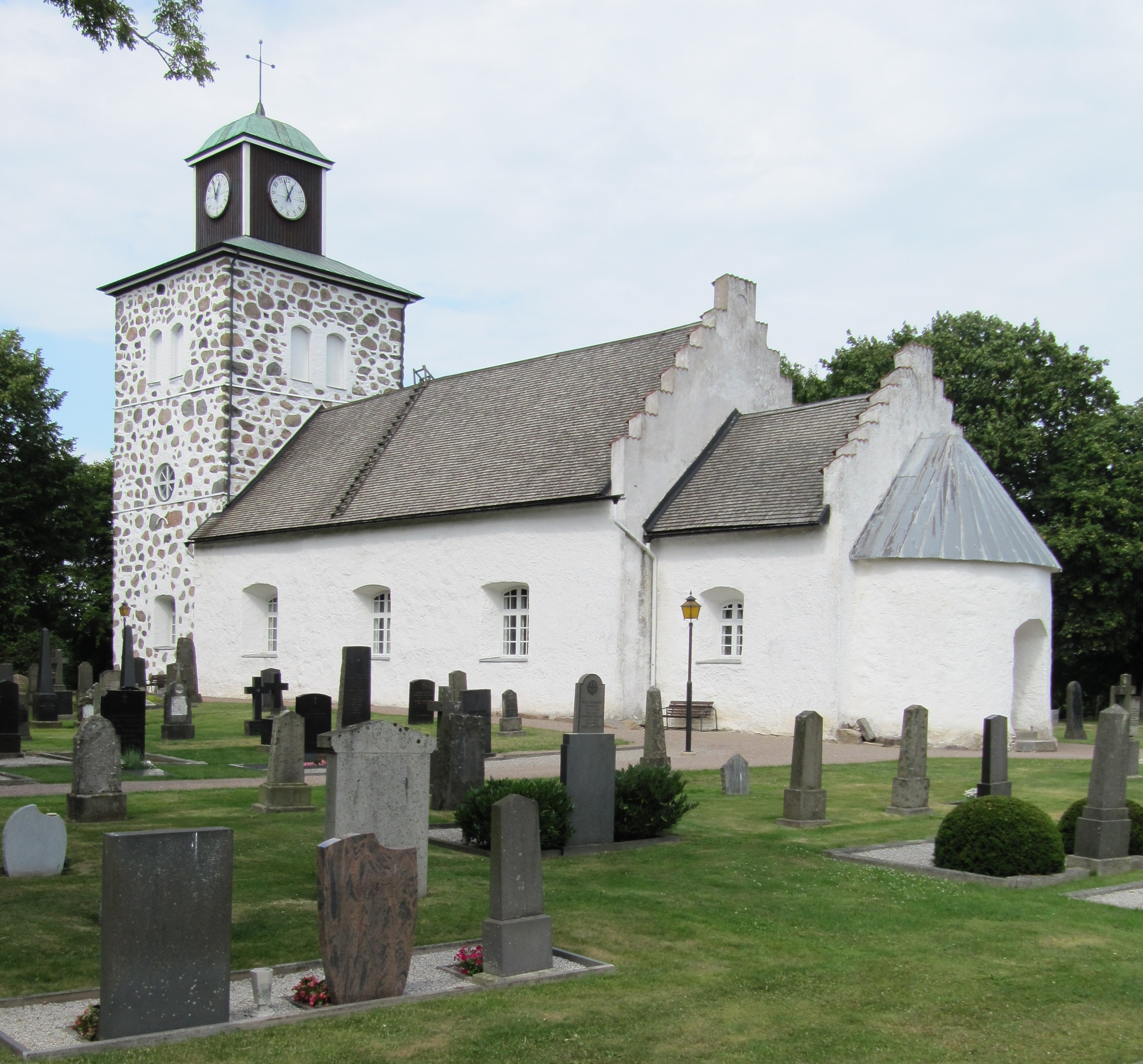
- Tåstarp Church

- 56°16′40″N 12°57′00″E
- Country: Sweden
- Denomination: Church of Sweden

Tåstarp Church (Swedish: Tåstarps kyrka) is a medieval church in Tåstarp, Ängelholm Municipality in the province of Skåne, Sweden.

== History and architecture ==
Tåstarp Church was built c. 1200. The oldest parts are the nave, chancel and apse. During the 15th century, the earlier ceilings were replaced with vaults in the nave and chancel. The church was somewhat enlarged towards the west in the 18th century, and the tower built 1829. The church was renovated in 1916 under the guidance of architect Theodor Wåhlin. The oldest item in the church is the baptismal font, which dates to the construction of the church. A rood cross from c. 1500 hangs in the chancel. The altarpiece is a composite artwork, with a framework from the 17th century and paintings from 1776. The pulpit is from 1619. Fragmentary remains of medieval murals are also preserved in the church.
