= Munka-Ljungby Church =

- Munka-Ljungby kyrka
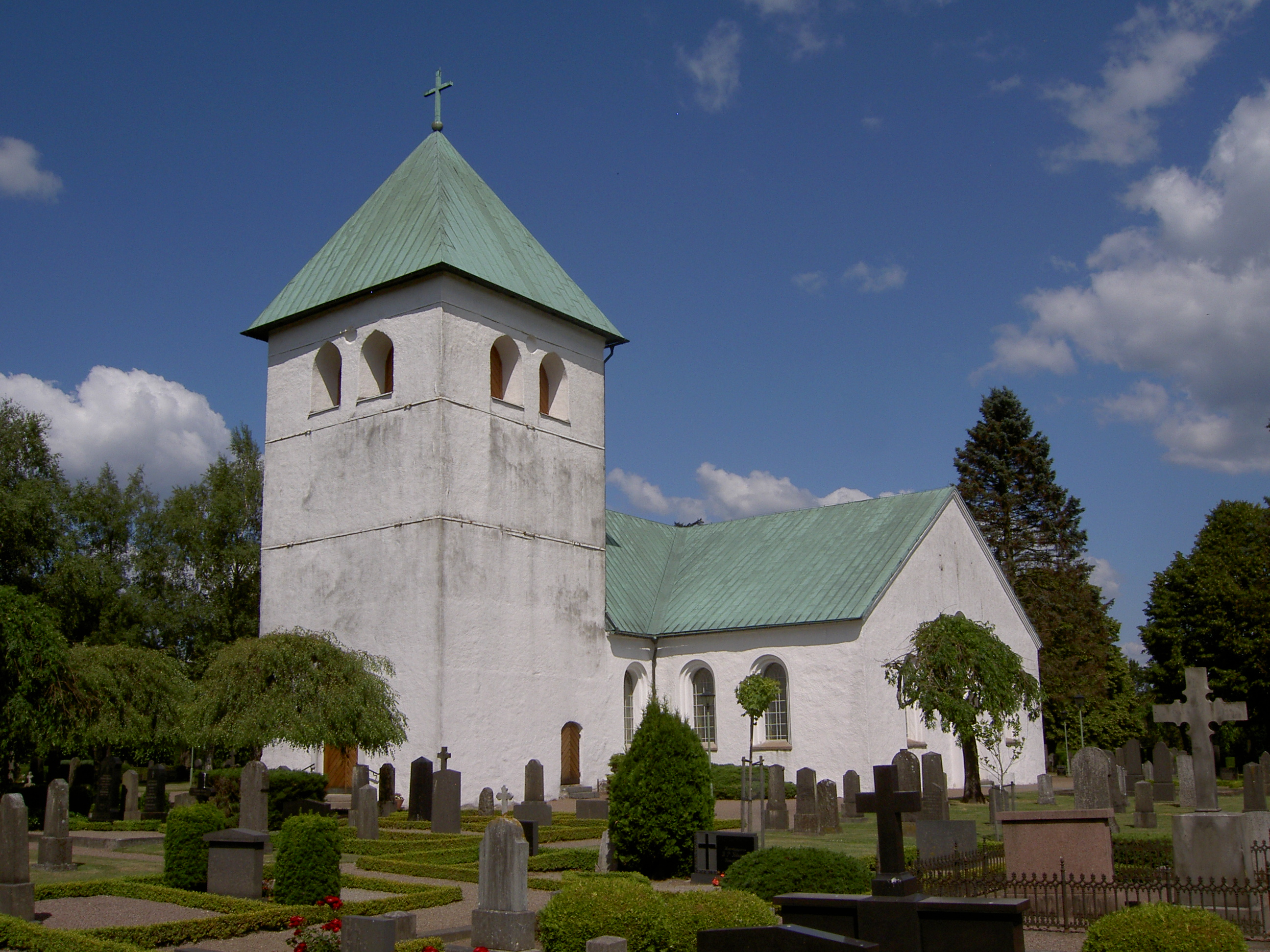
- Munka-Ljungby Church

- 56°15′36″N 12°58′27″E
- Country: Sweden
- Denomination: Church of Sweden

Munka-Ljungby Church (Swedish: Munka-Ljungby kyrka) is a medieval church in Munka-Ljungby (Ängelholm Municipality) in the province of Scania, Sweden. It was built in the late 12th century, or around 1200. It contains a decorated medieval baptismal font and fragmentary remains of medieval murals.

== History and architecture ==
The church in Munka-Ljungby was erected during the late 12th century or about 1200, and originally consisted only of a nave and choir. Monks from Herrevad Abbey were probably involved in its construction. During the 13th century the tower was built, and in the 14th century a church porch added in front of the southern entrance. During the 15th century the interior remade and vaults built to support the ceiling. The tower was also enlarged.

Further changes were made in the 19th century, when the transept added (designed by Carl Georg Brunius) and the former choir remade into a vestry. A renovation was carried out 1930–31. In the 1940s, stained glass windows designed by artist Hugo Gehlin were installed in the windows of the transept; the windows in the choir are from 1980 (designed by Nils Möller) and that in the vestry from 1993 (designed by Ralph Bergholtz).

== Furnishings and murals ==
The oldest item in the church is the baptismal font, which dates from the 13th century. It is decorated with Romanesque carvings depicting Christ and some of the apostles. The pulpit and the altarpiece are works from the 19th century. There is also a decorated, monumental tombstone in the vestry, depicting nobleman Jakob Krabbe in a suit of armour. Fragmentary remains of medieval murals are preserved in the choir vault.

== Gallery ==
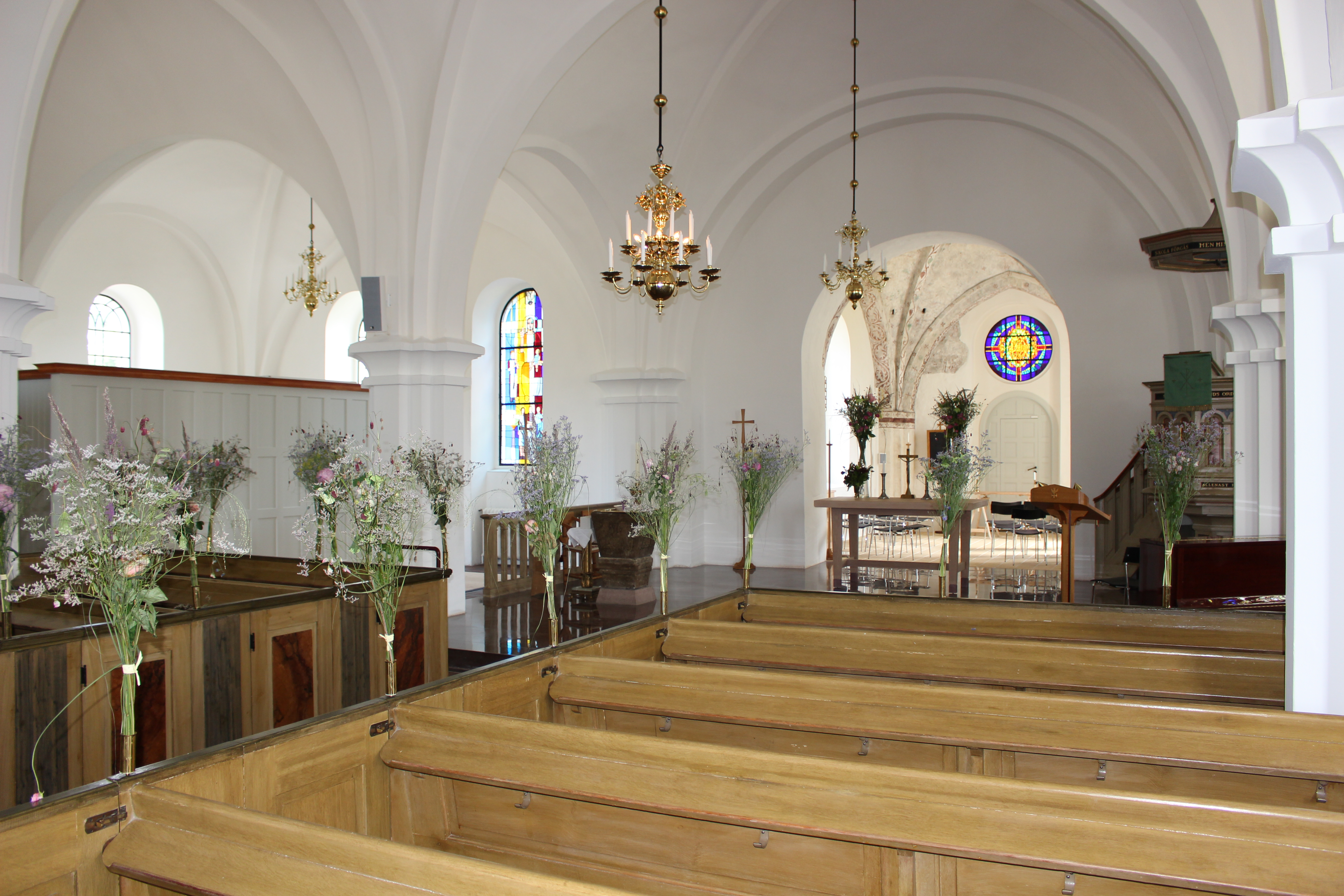
View of the interior towards the east

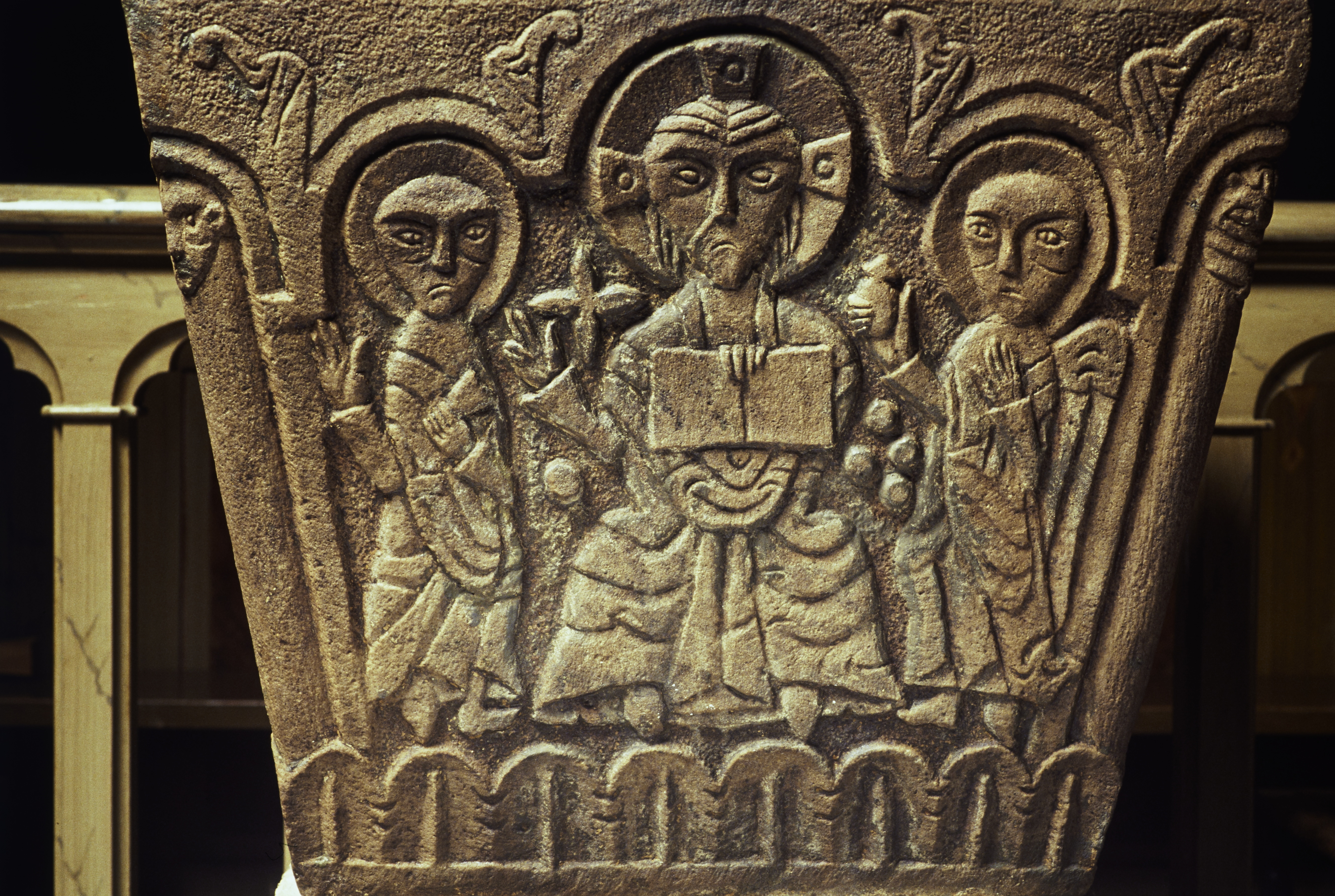
The Romanesque baptismal font

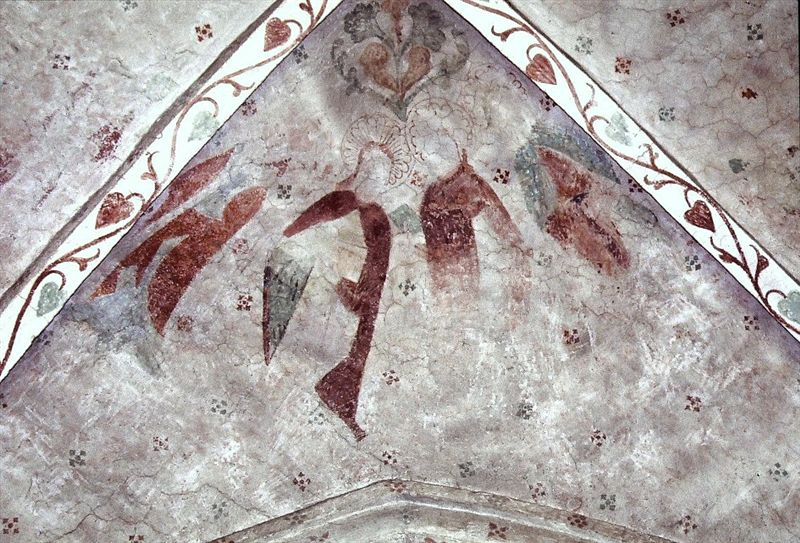
Medieval murals
