= Skepparkroken =

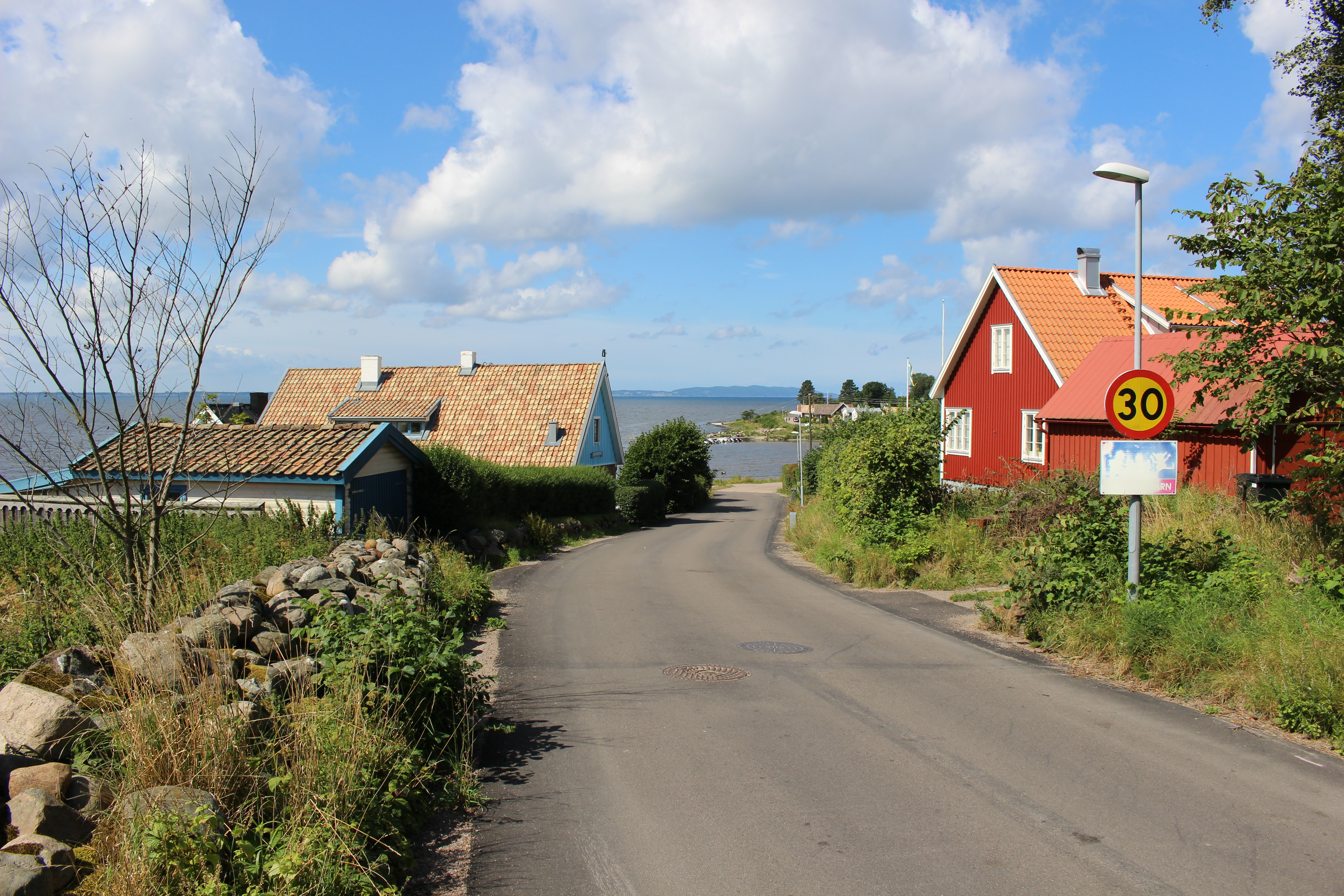
- Skepparkroken facing Skälderviken bay

- Location within Skåne Location within Sweden
- Coordinates: 56°18′N 12°48′E
- Country: Sweden
- Province: Skåne
- County: Skåne County
- Municipality: Ängelholm Municipality

Area
  - Total: 0.78 km^{2} (0.30 sq mi)

Population (31 December 2010)
  - Total: 743
  - Density: 951/km^{2} (2,460/sq mi)
- Time zone: UTC+1 (CET)
  - Summer (DST): UTC+2 (CEST)

Skepparkroken was a locality situated in Ängelholm Municipality, Skåne County, Sweden with 743 inhabitants in 2010. It is considered part of Ängelholm from 2015 onwards.
