= Sven Rydenfelt =

Swedish economist and political writer (1911–2005)

Sven Rydenfelt (23 January 1911 – 15 February 2005) was a Swedish economist and political writer known for his libertarian views.

Sven Rydenfelt was born in Hjärnarp, Ängelholm Municipality, Sweden. He became politically active during the 1940s when he started to write for several newspapers and journals. In 1945 he became the first chairman of the Liberal Student Association (affiliated with the social liberal People's Party) in Lund. Within the People's Party, Rydenfelt was considered as a rising young man and a possible candidate as Member of Parliament. However, due to a conflict with then party leader Bertil Ohlin over the party's stance on value added tax (which Rydenfelt opposed and Ohlin supported), Rydenfelt was forced to leave the party. During the 1950s he came to work for the Moderate Party instead. Among other things, he authored the party's program on housing policy. However, due to his strong support for the free market he was still considered too controversial by some.

Rydenfelt predicted already in 1956 the future collapse of the Soviet Union. In an article in the journal Samtid och Framtid (no.5/1956) he wrote: "Some argue that only a third world war could bring the Soviet Empire to an end. An inconsolable thought. If merely we have patience, it will crack from within, and through its gravel and ashes a new and more free Russia will rise".

In 1956, Rydenfelt was elected to the Mont Pelerin Society where he learned to know people like Friedrich Hayek and Milton Friedman who came to influence much of his political thinking. During the 1960s he continued his criticism of what he saw as the overregulated Swedish economy. In 1966 he authored the book Säkerhetspolisens hemliga register – om åsiktsfrihet och åsiktsförföljelse ("The Secret Registry of the Security Service – On Freedom of Opinion And Political Persecution") together with Janerik Larsson. This book led the Swedish Security Service to classify him as a "dangerous leftist activist" (Swedish: samhällsfarlig vänsteraktivist).

It was first during the 1970s and 1980s that Rydenfelt's work and ideas was to be recognized in Sweden, and he became something of an icon among young Swedish conservatives and neoliberals. Due to his, for the Swedish political establishment, controversial opinions, he wasn't given a professorship until 1991, when the ministry of Carl Bildt took office. However, Rydenfelt continued to criticize both the Social Democrats as well as the non-socialist parties.

Towards the end of his life, Rydenfelt was a member of the editorial board of the journal Nyliberalen ("The Neoliberal"). He was also critical of the European Union and was an honorary member of Citizens Against EMU (Swedish: Medborgare mot EMU), the main non-socialist organization which campaigned against Sweden's adoption of the euro during the referendum in 2003.

== Bibliography ==
- Den svenska bostadskrisen : hur hyresregleringen skapar bostadsbrist (in Swedish). Stockholm: Natur & Kultur. 1950.
- De bostadslösa och samhället (in Swedish). Stockholm: Natur & Kultur. 1952.
- Bostadsnöden och hyresregleringen (in Swedish). Stockholm: Byrån för ekonomisk information. 1952.
- En dåres försvarstal : Öppet brev till generaldirektör Alf Johansson (in Swedish). Stockholm. 1953.
- Kommunismen i Sverige (in Swedish). Lund: Gleerup. 1954.
- Staten och makten : en studie i svensk regleringsekonomi (in Swedish). Stockholm: Natur & Kultur. 1955.
- Socialpolitik och samhällsekonomi (in Swedish). Stockholm. 1955.
- Vår framgångsrika bostadspolitik : debattens huvudargument med kommentarer (in Swedish). Stockholm: Natur & Kultur. 1956.
- Bakom folkhemmets fasader (in Swedish). Stockholm: Natur & Kultur. 1958.
- (ed.) Lund för hundra år sedan : Nya sparbanken i Lund : minnesskrift till hundraårsjubileet 1961 (in Swedish). Lund: Nya sparbanken. 1961.
- Vårt dynamiska näringsliv : industrialiseringens revolutioner och metamorfoser i Sverige (in Swedish). Stockholm: Rabén & Sjögren. 1965.
- Säkerhetspolisens hemliga register : om åsiktsfrihet och åsiktsförföljelse (in Swedish). (co-author: Janerik Larsson). Göteborg: Zinderman. 1966.
- Radio-TV-monopolet : främmande kropp i demokratiskt samhälle? (in Swedish). Göteborg: Zinderman. 1966.
- Förändringens vindar över svensk industri (in Swedish). Stockholm: Lindblad. 1968.
- Verdict on rent control : essays on the economic consequences of political action to restrict rents in five countries. (co-author: Friedrich Hayek). London: Institute of Economic Affairs. 1972.
- Vårt ekonomiska system : om marknadsekonomi och marknadskrafter (in Swedish). Stockholm: Svenska arbetsgivarefören. 1973.
- Vår paradoxala bostadspolitik : brist och överflöd : analys och kritik av 30 års centralstyre (in Swedish). Stockholm: Byggförl. 1973.
- Det sjuka 70-talet : om massarbetslöshetens återkomst och sysselsättningens fjärde dimension : Adam Smith Redivivus 1776-1976 (in Swedish). Lund: Studentlitt. (distr.). 1976.
- Luspudel, klantskalle och andra skällsord (in Swedish). Stockholm: B. Wahlström. 1978.
- Japan : vad kan vi lära av arbetsglädjens och produktionsundrens land? (in Swedish). Stockholm: Sveriges marknadsförbund. 1978.
- Sveriges ekonomi i fara : om krisen och en förtryckt minoritet (in Swedish). Stockholm: Timbro. 1979.
- The limits of taxation : lessons from the Swedish welfare state. Lund: Lund University. 1980.
- Demokrati på avvägar : monopoldemokratin : om det svenska högskatte- och bidragssamhällets nedgång och sönderfall (in Swedish). Simrishamn: Grafika. 1980.
- Människan och samhället. Ekonomi (in Swedish). Stockholm: LiberLäromedel. 1981.
- The rise and decline of the Swedish welfare state : a study in black and scarlet. Lund: Lund University. 1981.
- Bönder, mat, socialism (in Swedish). Malmö: LiberFörlag. 1983.
- Välfärdsstatens förfall : en studie i svart och rött : en skrift först presenterad inför ett symposium arrangerat av Centret för politisk forskning och information i Aten i maj 1981 (in Swedish). Stockholm: Timbro : Näringslivets förlagsdistribution. 1983.
- A pattern for failure : socialist economies in crisis. San Diego: Harcourt Brace Jovanovich. 1985. ISBN 9780151713332.
- På upptäcktsfärd i marknadsriket : om det frivilliga samarbetets välståndsskapande krafter (in Swedish). Stockholm: Contra. 1988.
- Skola med sång och glädje (in Swedish). Stockholm: Timbro. 1990.
- Från tornspiror till grävmaskiner : Åkermans i Eslöv 1890-1990 : ett företags öden och äventyr under 100 år (in Swedish). Eslöv: Åkermans verkstad. 1990.
- Sjukdomarnas samhällsekonomiska aspekt (in Swedish). Lund: Institutet för hälso- och sjukvårdsekonomi (IHE). 1991.
- Sagan om Tetra pak : till hundraårsminnet av Ruben Rausings födelse 1895 (in Swedish). Stockholm: Fischer. 1995.
- Om företagarmiljöns förgiftning : ge entreprenörerna chansen att skapa full sysselsättning (in Swedish). Stockholm: Timbro. 1997.
