= Anton Santesson =

Swedish ice hockey player

- Born: April 29, 1994 (age 31) Ängelholm, Sweden
- Height: 5 ft 10 in (178 cm)
- Weight: 190 lb (86 kg; 13 st 8 lb)
- Position: Defence
- Shoots: Left
- SHL team: Rögle BK
- Playing career: 2013–present

Anton Santesson (born April 29, 1994) is a Swedish ice hockey defenceman. He is currently playing with Rögle BK of the Swedish Hockey League (SHL).

Santesson made his Elitserien (now the SHL) debut playing with Rögle BK during the 2012–13 Elitserien season.
