= UFO sightings in Poland =

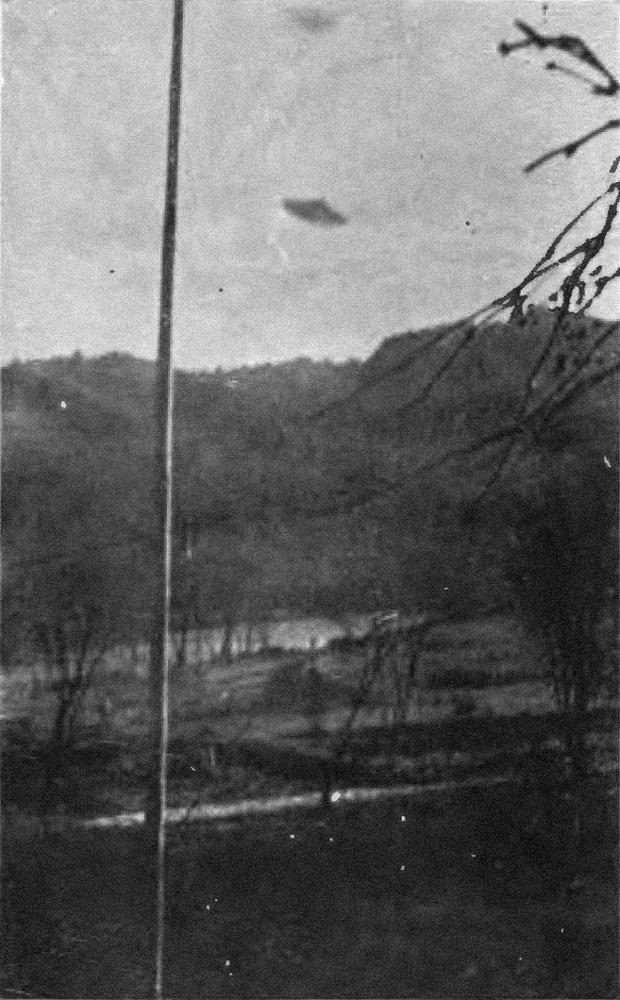
Photograph of an unidentified flying object in Muszyna, taken by Stanisław Kowalczewski on 22 December 1958

This is a list of alleged sightings of unidentified flying objects or UFOs in Poland.

== 10 May 1978, Emilcin ==
A farmer in Emilcin is said to have been abducted and medically examined by short, green-faced, humanoid entities speaking an unearthly language in a white, hovering, humming craft. There is now a memorial at the site.

== 19 January 2009, Jarnołtówek ==
At 1:00 am, Adam Maksymów of the village of Jarnołtówek near Prudnik went outside to charge his car battery. He was interrupted by a noise, which he likened to rockets blasting off. Then he heard a buzzing sound which he compared to that of a swarm of bees. He saw a blinding light and a huge saucer with a triangular glowing blue beam on its underbelly rise above the ground and take off into the night sky at a significant velocity. Other residents of Jarnołtówek also reported seeing the object.

== See also ==
- List of reported UFO sightings
