= Robert Mirosavic =

Swedish footballer

Personal information
- Date of birth: February 6, 1995 (age 31)
- Place of birth: Ängelholm, Sweden
- Height: 1.77 m (5 ft 10 in)
- Position: Winger

Team information
- Current team: Höganäs BK

Youth career
- Högaborgs BK
- –2012: Helsingborgs IF
- 2012–2014: Benfica

Senior career*
Years	Team	Apps	(Gls)
2014–2015	Ängelholms FF	12	(0)
2016	Högaborgs BK		
2017	Swope Park Rangers	12	(0)
2018–	Höganäs BK	0	(0)

International career
2010–2011	Sweden U17	14	(4)
- * Club domestic league appearances and goals as of 09:44, 21 March 2018 (UTC)

Robert Mirosavic (born February 6, 1995) is a Swedish footballer.

== Career ==
Mirosavic moved to the academy of Benfica from Helsingborgs IF in 2012. He returned to Sweden with his hometown team Ängelholms FF in 2014, before a short spell with Högaborgs BK in 2016.

Mirosavic was signed by United Soccer League side Swope Park Rangers on 20 February 2017. He was released by the club at the end of their 2017 season.

Mirosavic was signed by Höganäs BK on 15 March 2018.
