= Munka-Ljungby =

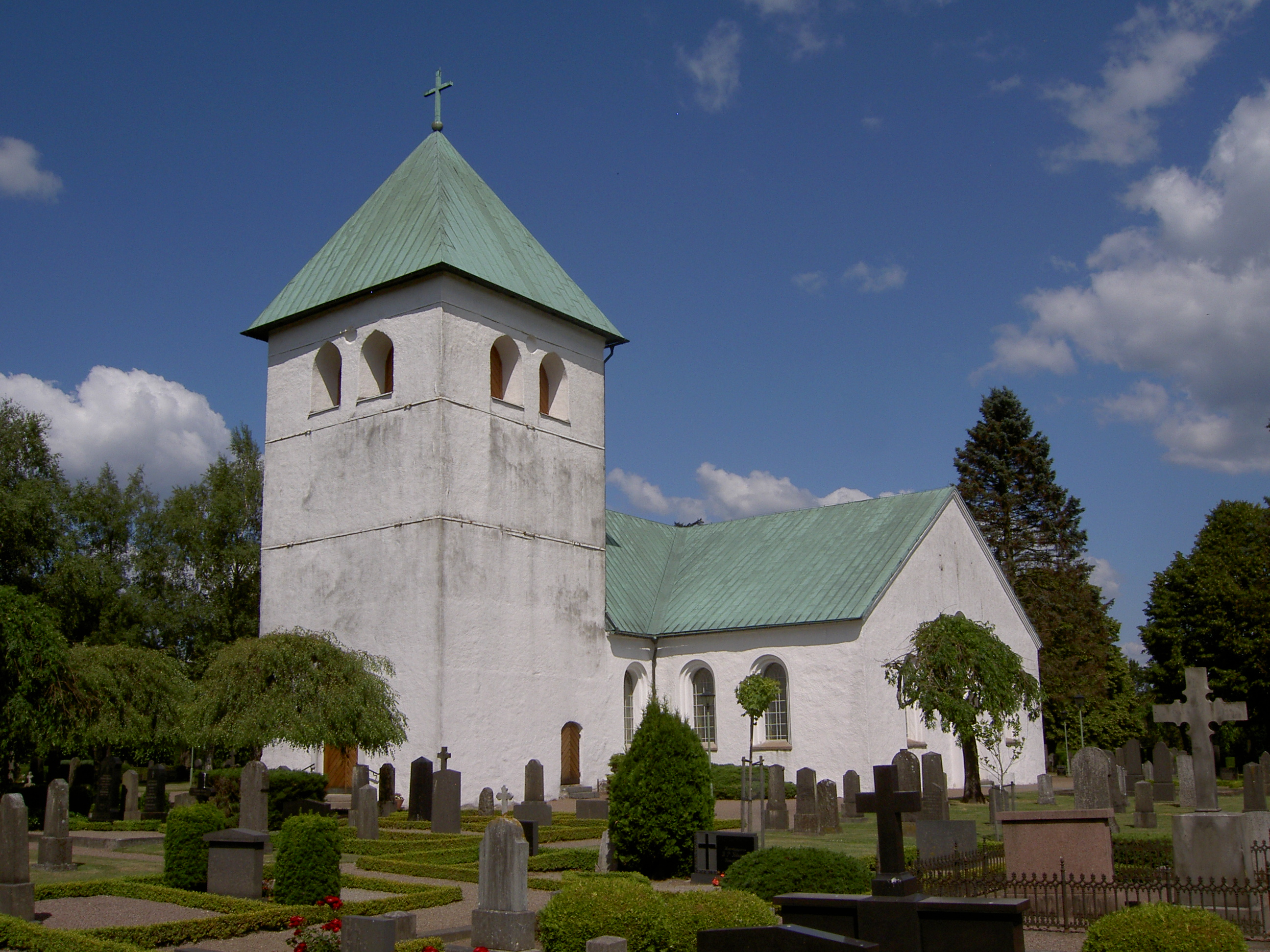
- Munka-Ljungby Church

- Location within Skåne Location within Sweden
- Coordinates: 56°15′N 12°58′E
- Country: Sweden
- Province: Skåne
- County: Skåne County
- Municipality: Ängelholm Municipality

Area
  - Total: 2.23 km^{2} (0.86 sq mi)

Population (31 December 2010)
  - Total: 2,840
  - Density: 1,272/km^{2} (3,290/sq mi)
- Time zone: UTC+1 (CET)
  - Summer (DST): UTC+2 (CEST)

Munka-Ljungby is a locality situated in Ängelholm Municipality, Skåne County, Sweden with 2,840 inhabitants in 2010.
