= Höja =

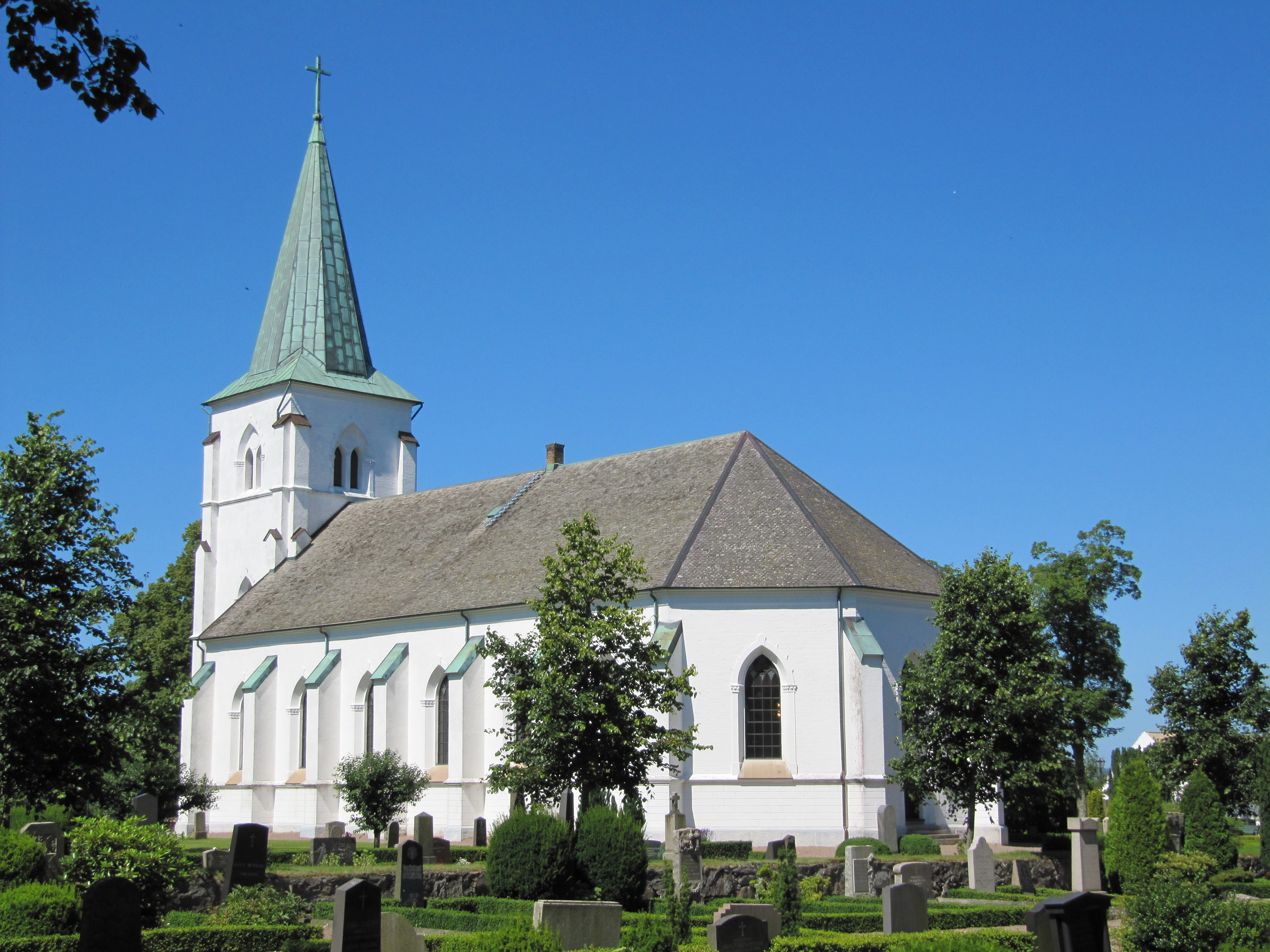
- Höja Church

- Location within Skåne Location within Sweden
- Coordinates: 56°14′N 12°55′E
- Country: Sweden
- Province: Skåne
- County: Skåne County
- Municipality: Ängelholm Municipality

Area
  - Total: 0.23 km^{2} (0.089 sq mi)

Population (31 December 2010)
  - Total: 202
  - Density: 864/km^{2} (2,240/sq mi)
- Time zone: UTC+1 (CET)
  - Summer (DST): UTC+2 (CEST)

Höja is a small settlement situated in Ängelholm Municipality, Skåne County, Sweden. It had 202 inhabitants in 2010, and lost its locality status in 2015 due to low population numbers.
