= Margretetorp =

Locality in Skåne, Sweden

- Location within Skåne Location within Sweden
- Coordinates: 56°20′N 12°53′E
- Country: Sweden
- Province: Skåne
- County: Skåne County
- Municipality: Ängelholm Municipality

Area
  - Total: 0.36 km^{2} (0.14 sq mi)

Population (31 December 2010)
  - Total: 214
  - Density: 598/km^{2} (1,550/sq mi)
- Time zone: UTC+1 (CET)
  - Summer (DST): UTC+2 (CEST)

Margretetorp is a locality situated in Ängelholm Municipality, Skåne County, Sweden with 214 inhabitants in 2010.
