= Kronoskogen =

Forest

Coordinates: 56.24000°N 12.82743°E

Kronoskogen is a forest area between Ängelholm and Skälderviken in Sweden. It is 6 kilometers by 2 kilometers, and is partially a protected nature reserve. It is home to an unusual forest ecosystem due to its sandy soils and beach location.

== See also ==
- UFO-Memorial Ängelholm
