= Svenstorp =

- Location within Skåne Location within Skåne
- Coordinates: 56°20′N 12°56′E
- Country: Sweden
- Province: Skåne
- County: Skåne County
- Municipality: Ängelholm Municipality

Area
  - Total: 0.24 km^{2} (0.093 sq mi)

Population (31 December 2010)
  - Total: 239
  - Density: 1,016/km^{2} (2,630/sq mi)
- Time zone: UTC+1 (CET)
  - Summer (DST): UTC+2 (CEST)

Svenstorp is a locality in Ängelholm Municipality, Skåne County, Sweden. It had 239 inhabitants in 2010.
