= Ängelholm UFO memorial =

Monument near Ängelholm, Sweden

- UFO-monumentet i Ängelholm (Swedish)
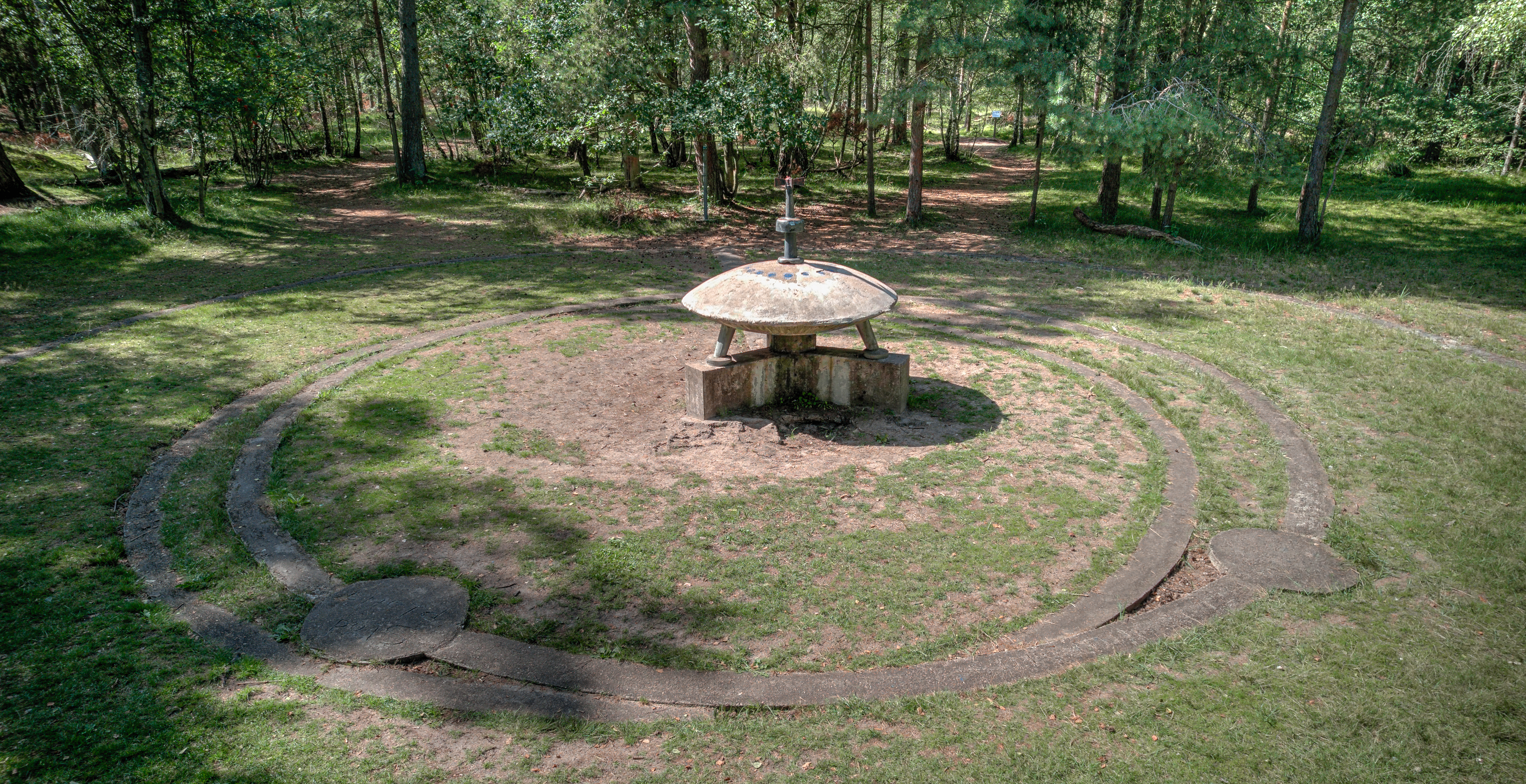
- Drone photograph of the memorial
- Interactive map of Ängelholm UFO memorial
- 56°13′58.4″N 12°49′8.6″E
- Location: Kronoskogen, Ängelholm, Skåne, Sweden

History
- Built: September 1972

Site notes
- Governing body: Swedish National Heritage Board

The Ängelholm UFO memorial is a monument dedicated to an alleged UFO landing site in the Kronoskogen forest near Ängelholm, Sweden. It includes a concrete scale model of a flying saucer, the purportedly life-size landing impressions on the ground, and copper plaques mounted on pillars. The monument reflects the account of Swedish entrepreneur Gösta Carlsson, who attributed his success in life to encountering a UFO in 1946. The memorial, erected in 1972, is maintained by the local government. Investigations into the account have not corroborated the UFO narrative. Despite a lack of evidence, it has become a tourist destination and national heritage site.

== Background ==
Gösta Carlsson (1918–2003) founded the herbal medicine company Cernelle in 1953. Sales of its bee pollen extracts made him a millionaire, and he became known as Pollenkungen (The Pollen King). Carlsson invested in the local ice hockey club, Rögle BK, and converted a former Cernelle warehouse into an ice hockey arena. Rögle BK signed Ulf Sterner, Sweden's first player to make a National Hockey League roster. In the 1960s, Rögle BK won its division and was promoted to the country's highest league, Hockeyettan.

Carlsson attributed his success to a May 1946 encounter with a UFO in the woods near Ängelholm, though he did not make any public statements until the 1970s. Carlsson said he was walking back from the beach through Kronoskogen, a forest planted into sandy soil to protect the coast, when he noticed a light at the edge of a clearing. He approached what, from a distance, seemed to be a crew setting up a carousel. Upon entering the glade, he reported seeing a disc sitting on a keel-like fin and a pair of retractable legs. Carlsson claims to have interacted with the crew, one of whom used a device resembling a chest-mounted bellows camera to keep him away. He described the human-looking crew as wearing tight-fitting, white flight suits with dark boots, belts, hoods, and earplugs.

After Carlsson witnessed the craft leave, he returned to the clearing to gather what he believed were discarded artifacts, including a quartz rod. He measured gouges in the ground that he attributed to the craft, and created sketches that would later form the basis of the UFO memorial. Throughout 1946, Carlsson reported a series of strange dreams where he said the UFO's pilot would communicate ideas to him. Carlsson would later tell an interviewer "the driver [...] speaks to me. I don't know if it's words or thoughts I perceive." These dreams, Carlsson claimed, spurred him to experiment with pollen as a natural remedy and start his company.

== Statements ==
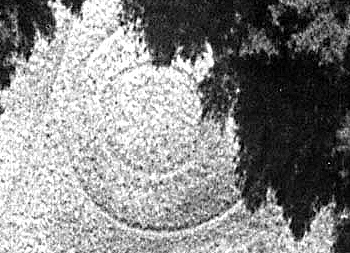
1963

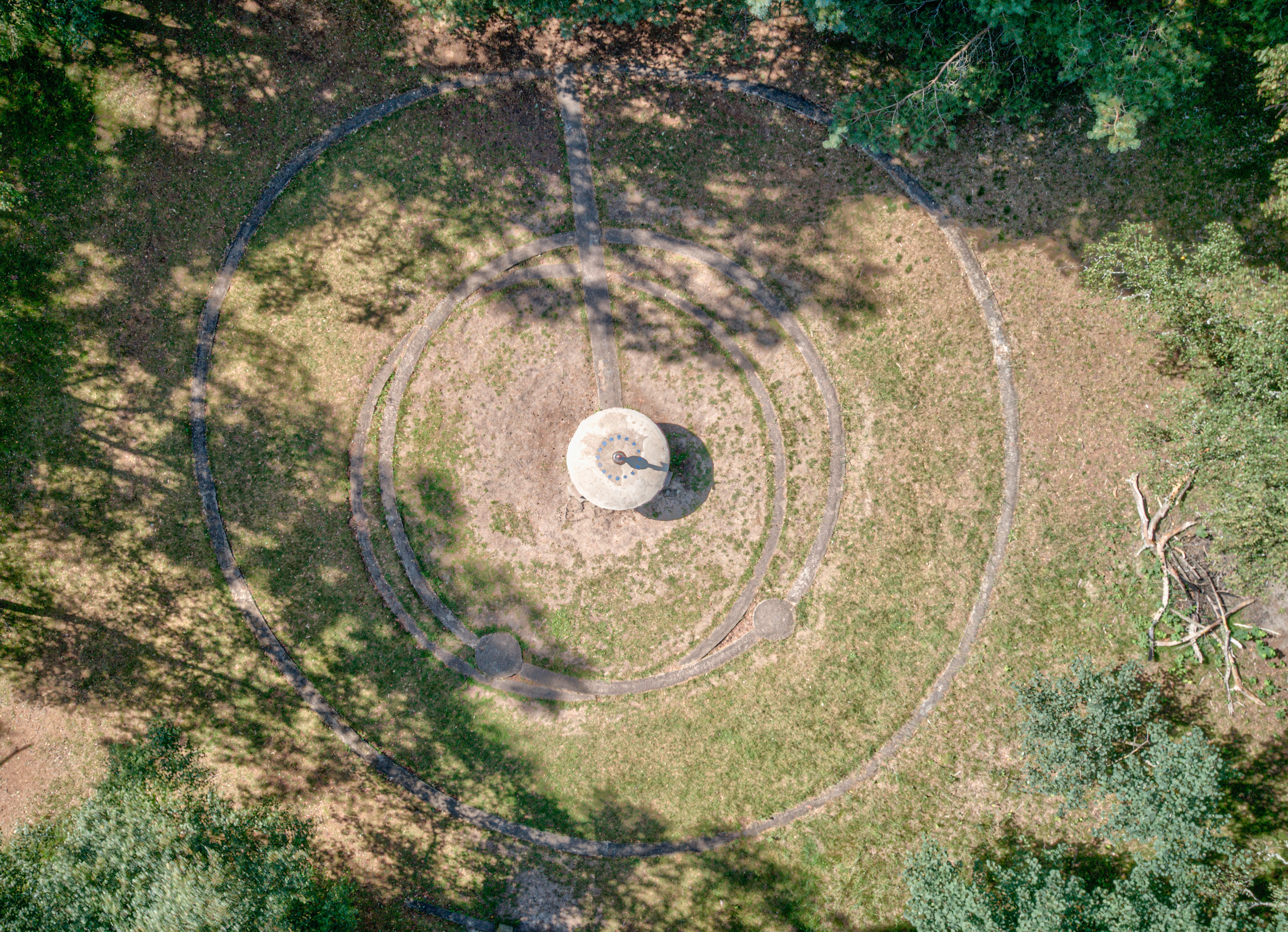
2021

Aerial photograph of the site in 1963 (monochrome), and drone photo of the completed memorial in 2021 (color)

Carlsson made his first public statements in a 1971 interview with journalist Eugen Semitjov. Semitjov went with Carlsson to the clearing before the memorial's construction. They discussed a circular impression approximately 50 feet (15 m) in diameter, 1 foot (30 cm) wide, and less than 1 inch (25 mm) deep but found no marks left by a keel or retractable legs. After the interview, Semitjov sent the purportedly discarded quartz to the mineralogical department at Stockholm University. Semitjov did not disclose the provenance of the quartz to the researchers, who found it to be completely mundane. One year later, Carlsson erected a monument in the clearing with landowner Erik von Geijer of Vegeholm Castle.

In 1995, Swedish ufologist Clas Svahn wrote a book with Carlsson about the incident, Mötet i gläntan (The meeting in the clearing). After years of research and over a hundred hours of interviews, Svahn came away disbelieving the encounter, but not doubting Carlsson's conviction. In an interview, Svahn said that the story "became a part of [Carlsson's] reality". Carlsson both maintained that the events occurred and acknowledged that they might sound like dreams to others. He additionally connected the Kronoskogen encounter to subsequent fainting spells, nightmares, and feeling as if his skull was an overloaded radio receiver. Swedish historian Dick Harrison characterized Carlsson's narrative as "alleged but not proven".

== Monument ==
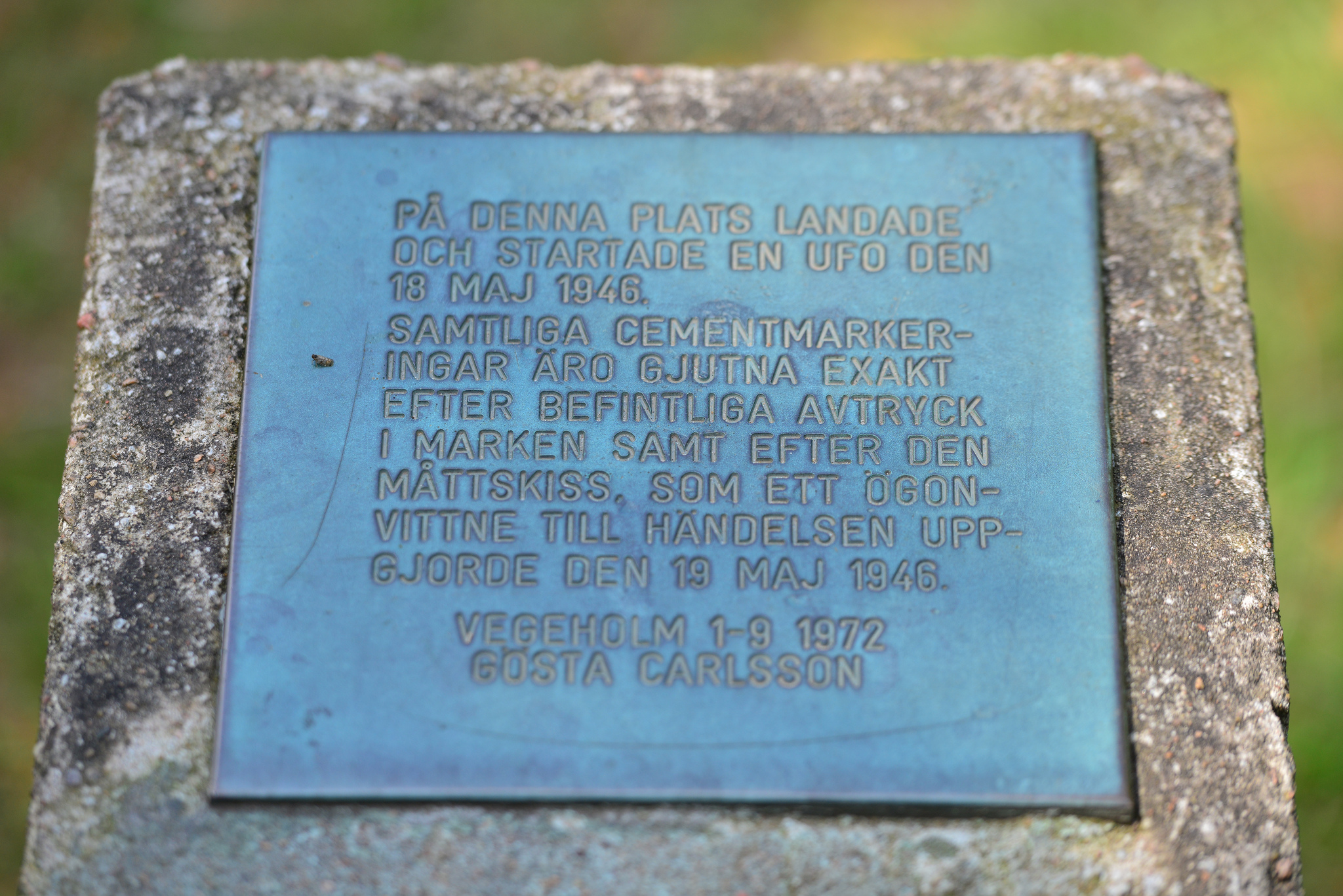
"A UFO landed and took off at this location on 18 May 1946. All cement markings are cast exactly according to existing impressions in the ground and according to the dimensional sketch, which an eyewitness to the event drew up on 19 May 1946. Vegeholm 1–9 1972 Gösta Carlsson" On-site plaque, Translated from Swedish

At the center of the memorial, a one-eighth-scale concrete model of a flying saucer sits atop a concrete pedestal. Cast in Carlsson's Välinge factory and based on his sketches, the model has a rear fin, support legs, and a metal periscope-like device protruding from the top. Concrete paths, which depict landing impressions, circle the model. Copper plaques mounted on pillars at the edge of the clearing provide the purported eyewitness testimony. The monument is Swedish National Heritage Board heritage site number RAÄ Strövelstorp 47:1.

A few kilometers from Ängelholm and within walking distance of the beach, the memorial is a tourist destination. After Mötet i gläntan was published, UFO-Sverige organized a national conference in Ängelholm, and Carlsson allowed a bank to display his alleged artifacts behind bullet-proof glass. Guided tours began hiking to the area in 1996, the 50th anniversary of Carlsson's reported sighting. Swedish actress and former tour guide Catherine Jeppsson said that the story was appealing because Carlsson "wasn't just anyone, and the fact that he also claimed that he had the aliens to thank for everything didn't make the story any worse". Tours often begin from the Skåne Line bunkers on the beach, before hiking through the Kronoskogen forest, and into the glade. A 2015 initiative allowed Ängelholm Municipality to maintain the privately owned site. Workers cleared encroaching plants, replaced rotten wood benches, and repaired the concrete paths on the forest floor.

== See also ==
- Emilcin UFO memorial – a UFO monument erected in Emilcin, Poland, where a farmer says he experienced an alien abduction in 1978
- Robert Taylor incident – a reported UFO sighting commemorated by the Dechmont UFO Trail in Livingston, Scotland
- List of reported UFO sightings – a list of reported sightings with corresponding Wikipedia articles
- UFO sightings in Sweden
