= Vejby Strand Hotel =

Hotel in Sweden

Coordinates: 56.30987°N 12.76416°E

Vejby Strand Hotel was established 1929 , then called "Strand Stugan". Through the years it has grown and names have changed from "Klittergården" to "Vejby Värdshus" to finally "Vejby Strand Hotel". Known for its location just next to the sand dunes and healthy air. It is located in ten km from the city center of Ängelholm, Sweden.
