= Emilcin Abduction =

1978 purported alien abduction in Poland

Jan Wolski
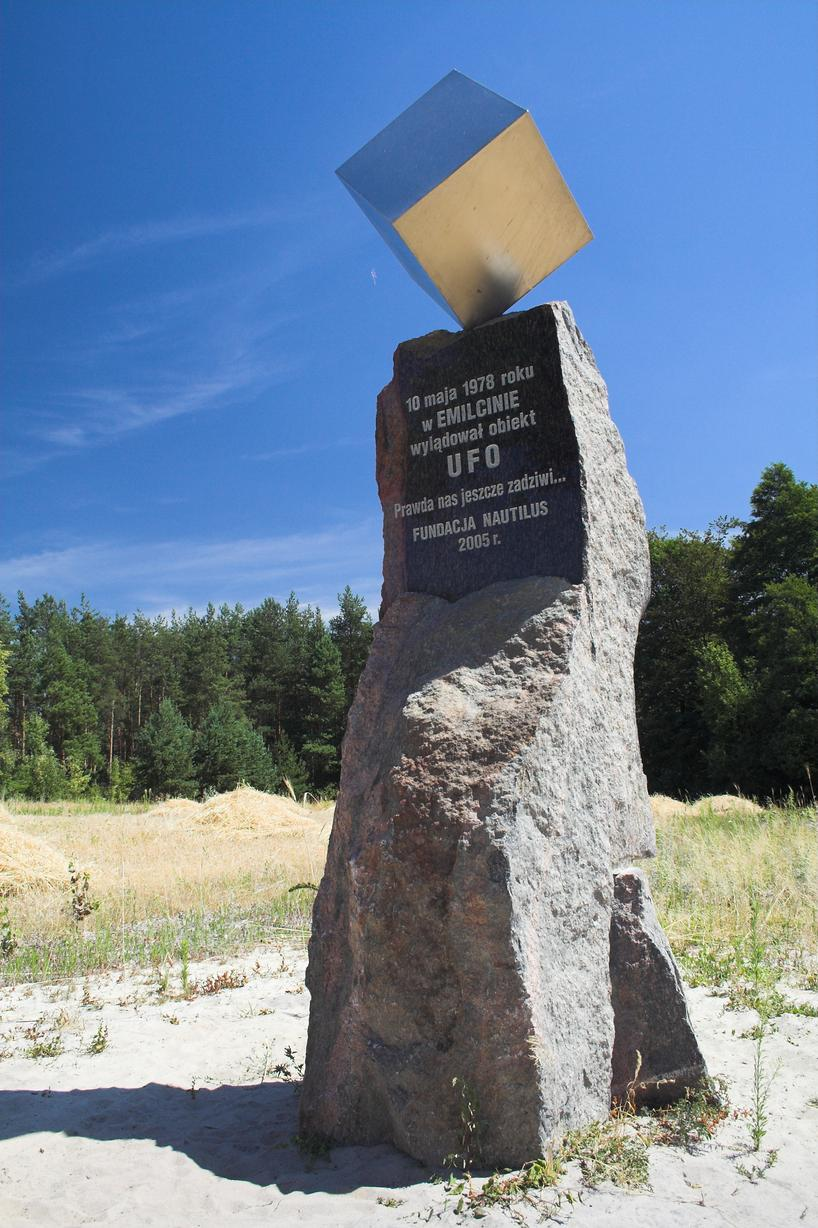
- Emilcin UFO memorial
- Born: 29 May 1907
- Died: 8 January 1990 (aged 82)
- Known for: Alleged abduction by aliens and being medically examined by them

Alleged abduction of Jan Wolski
- Status: Single abductee
- First abduction date: 10 May 1978
- Location: Emilcin Village, Poland
- Abductor: "Little Green Men"

Media
- Book: Zdarzenie w Emilcinie (Incident in Emilcin)

The Emilcin abduction was a supposed alien abduction of Polish farmer Jan Wolski in May 1978. The incident received little media attention at the time. A monument was later erected in Emilcin, Poland, at the site where the abduction was alleged to have occurred.

== Background ==
Jan Wolski (/ˈvɒlski/; 29 May 1907 – 8 January 1990) was a Polish farmer who reported that, early on 10 May 1978, while driving a horse-drawn cart, he was approached by two beings he described as "short, green-faced humanoid entities" approximately 5 feet (1.5 m) tall. According to Wolski, the beings jumped onto his cart, sat beside him, and spoke in an unfamiliar language. He initially assumed they were foreigners due to their "slanted eyes and prominent cheekbones". Wolski stated that he drove with the beings to a clearing where a large object was hovering.

=== The craft ===
Wolski described the object as a completely white unidentified flying craft, approximately 14.75 feet (4.5 m) to 16.5 feet (5.0 m) in height and "as long as a bus", hovering about 16 feet (4.9 m) above the ground. He reported no notable external features such as lights or joints. He stated that the craft had four black, drill-like protrusions that produced a humming sound. An elevator-like platform extended from the craft to the ground.

Wolski claimed that he was taken aboard the craft, accompanied by two additional beings he encountered near it. He reported that they gestured for him to undress, after which he observed eight to ten single-person benches arranged around the interior. He also described seeing rooks near the doorway, moving their legs and wings but apparently immobilized. According to his account, he was examined with a device resembling two dishes or "saucers". After the examination, he was told to dress.

Wolski stated that the interior of the craft was black with a greyish tint, matching the beings' clothing, and had no lights or windows, with illumination coming only from the open doorway. He claimed the beings ate something and offered him a similar item, described as resembling an icicle, which he declined. He was then led to the door, bowed to the beings, and was bowed to in return. The door closed, the craft ascended, and then departed.

== Aftermath ==
Wolski returned home and informed his family about the incident, urging them to come and see the hovering craft. He told his sons, who then called on neighbours, and together they went to investigate the site. According to accounts, the grass where the craft had been was "trodden down, covered with dew, and had paths coming in all directions". Wolski later returned home, leaving the rest of the group at the site. His sons claimed that footprints, allegedly left by the beings, were visible, though they did not specify whether they were larger or smaller than human footprints.

A six-year-old boy also claimed to have seen a bus-shaped craft hovering over a barn before ascending into the sky and disappearing.

Two months after the incident, in July 1978, Wolski described his recollections in an interview with Henryk Pomorski and Krystyna Adamczyk. The audio recording of the interview remained in a private archive for many years before being released to the public.

== Memorial ==
In 2005, a memorial was erected in Emilcin at coordinates 51°8′2.63″N 22°2′16.16″E to commemorate the reported alien abduction of Jan Wolski. The inscription in Polish reads: "On 10 May 1978 in Emilcin a UFO object landed. The truth will astonish us in the future."

== Media portrayals ==
The Emilcin incident has been the subject of several books and short television documentaries in Poland. In 1978, a short comic book about the event, titled Przybysze (English: The Visitors), written by Henryk Kurta and illustrated by Grzegorz Rosiński, was published.

The 2025 Polish Netflix series Project UFO (Polish: Projekt UFO) is reported to be inspired by the Emilcin abduction.

== See also ==
- List of UFO sightings
- UFO sightings in Poland
