= Heliga korsets kapell, Ängelholm =

Heliga korsets kapell
- Holy Cross Chapel
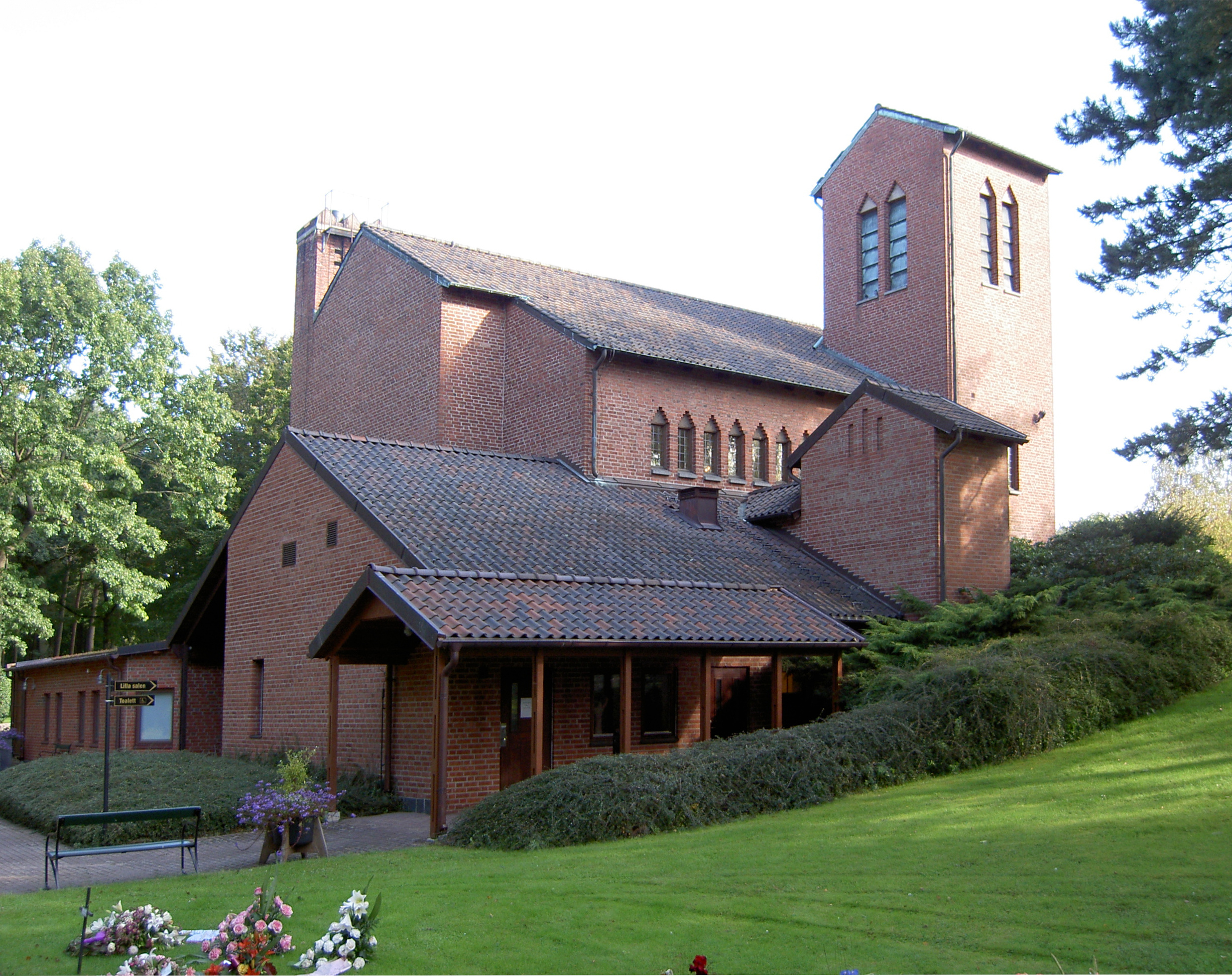
- Heliga korsets kapell i Ängelholm
- Heliga korsets kapell
- 56°15′16.86″N 12°52′17.76″E
- Location: Kapellgatan 1; 262 62 Ängelholm
- Country: Sweden
- Denomination: Church of Sweden (Evangelical Lutheran)

Administration
- Diocese: Diocese of Lund

Heliga korsets kapell (Holy Cross Chapel) is a chapel associated with the assembly of Ängelholm in the diocese of Lund. The chapel is located on the cemetery of Ängelholms church in the north part of central Ängelholm. The cemetery was opened in 1887 and was originally called the new, or, north cemetery.

== The church building ==
The chapel with a crematorium was built after drawings by the provincial architect Nils A. Blanck and was finished in 1956. An extension was added in 1986 after the drawings of the architect Lennart Hansson. Another extension to the chapel and crematorium was added in 2004 after the drawings of the architect Sulev Krämer.

The church choir wall has a fresco of Jesus Christ made by Pär Siegård.
