= Emilcin =

- Village
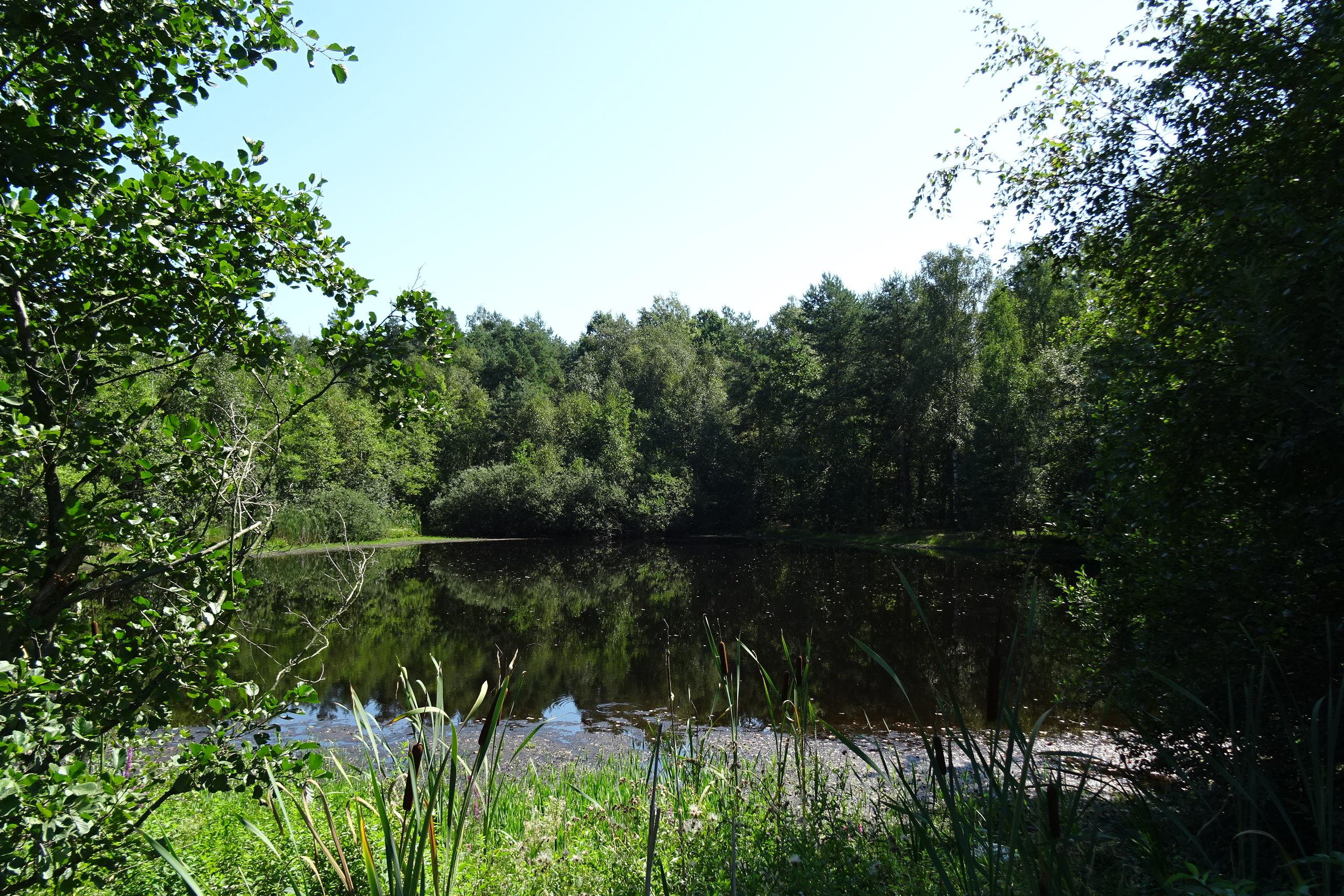
- Pond in Emilcin

- Location within Poland
- Coordinates: 51°8′12″N 22°2′21″E
- Country: Poland
- Voivodeship: Lublin
- County: Opole
- Gmina: Opole Lubelskie
- Time zone: UTC+1 (CET)
  - Summer (DST): UTC+2 (CEST)
- Vehicle registration: LOP

Emilcin [ɛˈmilt͡ɕin] is a village in the administrative district of Gmina Opole Lubelskie, within Opole County, Lublin Voivodeship, in eastern Poland.

One can find there the only UFO-related memorial in Poland, commemorating an alleged alien abduction.
