= Hjärnarp =

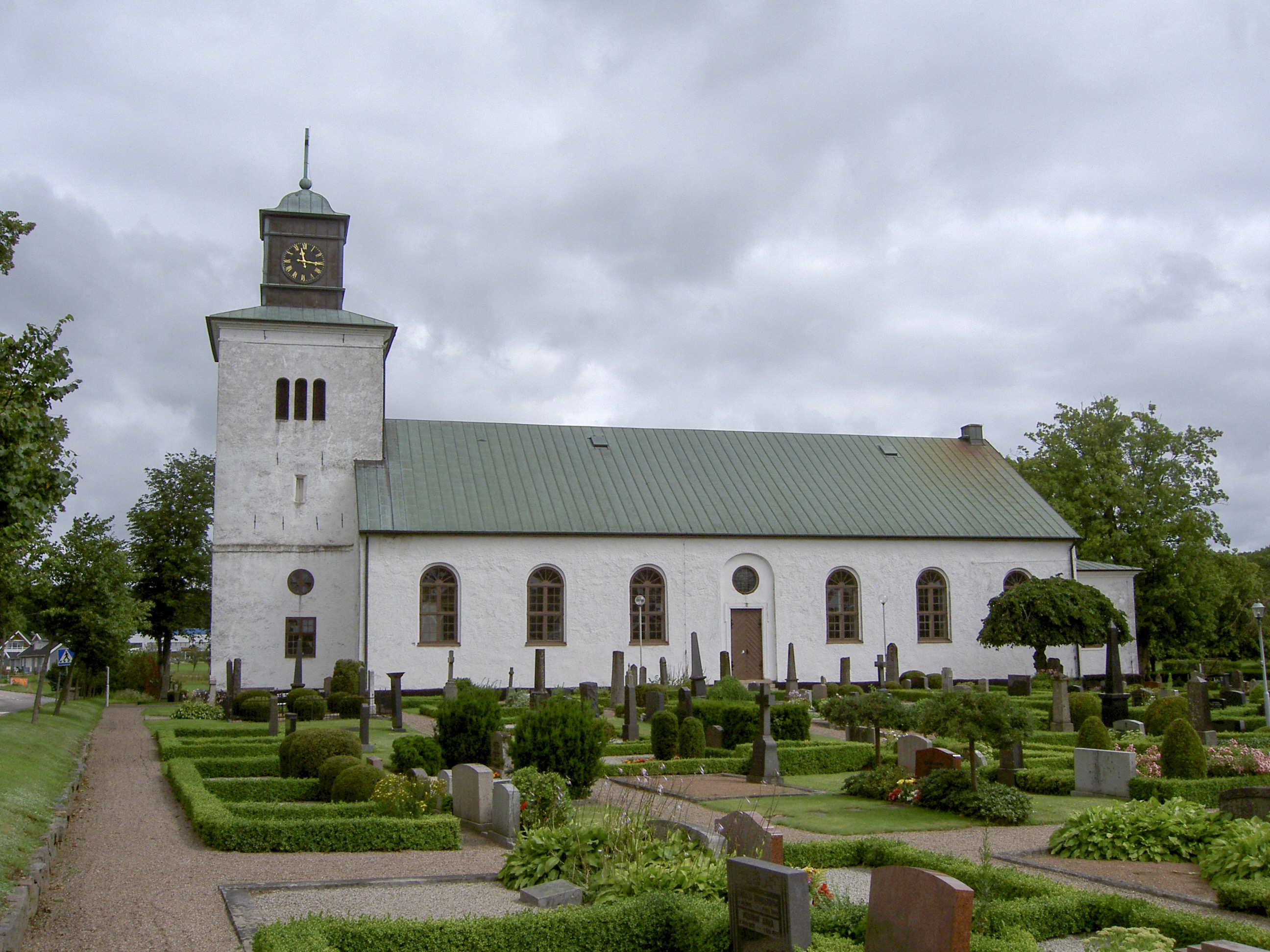
- Hjärnarp Church

- Location within Skåne Location within Sweden
- Coordinates: 56°19′N 12°55′E
- Country: Sweden
- Province: Skåne
- County: Skåne County
- Municipality: Ängelholm Municipality

Area
  - Total: 1.27 km^{2} (0.49 sq mi)

Population (31 December 2010)
  - Total: 975
  - Density: 769/km^{2} (1,990/sq mi)
- Time zone: UTC+1 (CET)
  - Summer (DST): UTC+2 (CEST)

Hjärnarp is a locality situated in Ängelholm Municipality, Skåne County, Sweden with 975 inhabitants in 2010.
