= Ängelholm =

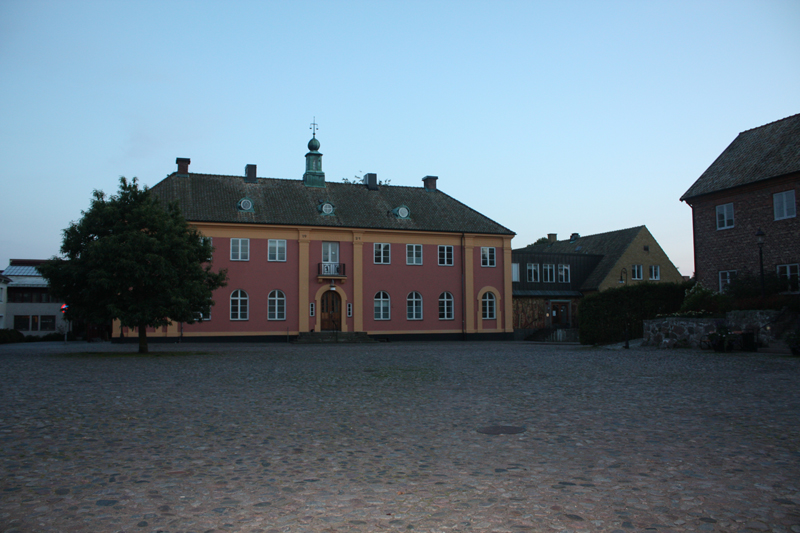
- Ängelholm old courthouse

- Coat of arms

- Location within Skåne Location within Sweden
- Coordinates: 56°15′N 12°51′E
- Skåne: Sweden
- Province: Skåne
- County: Skåne County
- Municipality: Ängelholm Municipality

Area
  - Total: 12.83 km^{2} (4.95 sq mi)

Population (31 March 2017)
  - Total: 42,131
  - Density: 1,811/km^{2} (4,690/sq mi)
- Time zone: UTC+1 (CET)
  - Summer (DST): UTC+2 (CEST)

Ängelholm is a locality and the seat of Ängelholm Municipality in Scania, Sweden with 42,131 inhabitants in 2017.

== History ==
The city was founded in 1516 as Engelholm by King Christian II of Denmark, who moved the settlement from Luntertun on the coast because it was difficult to defend. As a founder, King Christian II personally identified the boundaries of the new city, granting the city a charter in 1516. At Luntertun there is only a church garden left today.

The town remained small for centuries. Following the Treaty of Roskilde in 1658, Ängelholm, together with the rest of Skåne, was assigned by Denmark to Sweden. The town began to grow in the 19th century due to industrialization. It was also a garrison town until 1883 and had a Swedish Air Force base between 1941 and 2009. The older spelling Engelholm was retained until 1912, when the city council decided to adopt a more modern spelling in line with the Swedish spelling reform of 1906. The high-performance car manufacturer Koenigsegg Automotive is based on the premises of the decommissioned Scania Wing (F 10).

== Contemporary ==
Tourism is an important industry for the city. There is a six-kilometer-long sandy beach right outside the town. The winds in Skälder Bay make the beach a popular place for sailors, wave surfers and wind surfers.

There is also an ice cream manufacturer, Engelholms Glass which produces about 1.2 million litres of ice-cream every year.

A special sight of Ängelholm is the UFO-Memorial Ängelholm.

The city is known for its clay cuckoos — a special kind of ocarina. This is, however, a dying tradition as there is now only one producer of clay cuckoos, Sofia Nilsson. Ängelholm has the only orchestra of clay cuckoos in the whole world, which performed at the "Allsång på Skansen" in 2007.

Ängelholm is also the home of hockey team Rögle BK that competes in the SHL.

== Notable people ==
- Emma Andersson, singer, model, chef, and TV personality
- Sebastian Andersson, Footballer
- Sofie Andersson, golfer
- Malik Bendjelloul, Academy Award winning filmmaker
- Frans G. Bengtsson, author
- Gösta Carlsson, road racing cyclist
- Jörgen Elofsson, songwriter
- Anna Fiske, illustrator and writer
- Maja Francis, singer
- Isabelle Haak, volleyball player
- Roger Hansson, ice hockey player
- Jill Johnson, singer
- Jörgen Jönsson, ice hockey player
- Kenny Jönsson, ice hockey player
- Elliot Kaczynski, racing driver
- Christian von Koenigsegg, automotive mogul
- Jarl Kulle, actor and director
- Timothy Liljegren, ice hockey player
- Christopher Liljewall, ice hockey player
- Robert Mirosavic, footballer
- Rikard Nilsson, chef
- Gustav Olhaver, ice hockey player
- Maria Rooth, ice hockey player
- Sven Rydenfelt, economist
- Anton Santesson (born 1994), ice hockey defenceman
- Jenny Silver, singer
- Peter Svensson, tennis player
- Peter Wichers, musician

== See also ==
- Heliga korsets kapell, Ängelholm
- Koenigsegg
