= Ängelholm Municipality =

Ängelholm Municipality Ängelholms kommun
- Municipality
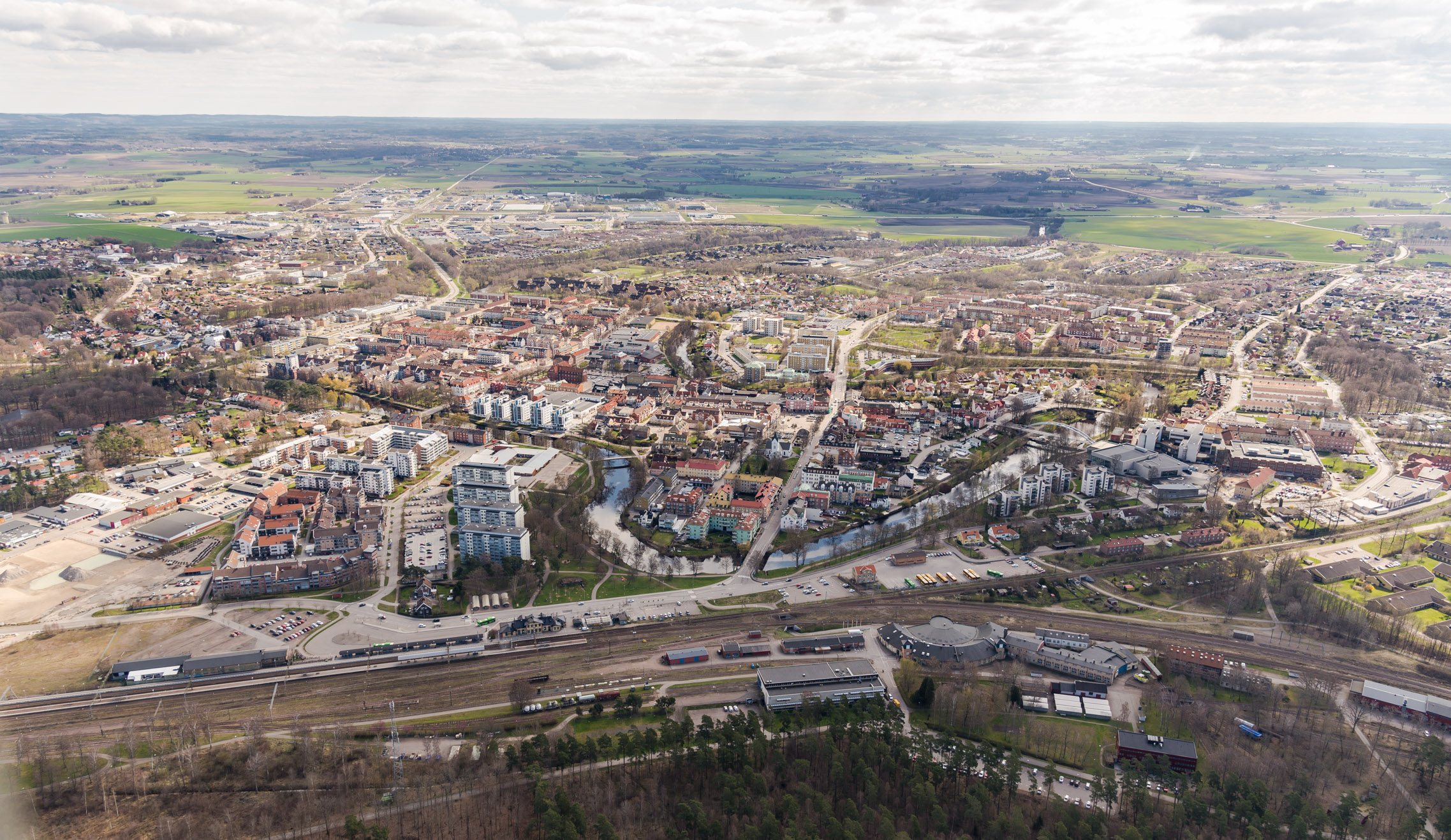

- Coat of arms

- Coordinates: 56°15′N 12°51′E
- Country: Sweden
- National Area: South Sweden
- County: Scania County
- Seat: Ängelholm

Area
  - Total: 478.06 km^{2} (184.58 sq mi)
  - Land: 420.06 km^{2} (162.19 sq mi)
  - Water: 58 km^{2} (22 sq mi)
- Area as of 1 January 2014.

Population (30 June 2025)
  - Total: 45,085
  - Density: 107.33/km^{2} (277.98/sq mi)
- Time zone: UTC+1 (CET)
  - Summer (DST): UTC+2 (CEST)
- ISO 3166 code: SE
- Province: Scania
- Municipal code: 1292
- Website: www.engelholm.se

Ängelholm Municipality (Swedish: Ängelholms kommun) is a municipality in Scania County in South Sweden in southern Sweden. Its seat is located in the city Ängelholm.

In 1971 the City of Ängelholm was amalgamated with the rural municipalities Ausås, Barkåkra, Hjärnarp and Munka-Ljungby, thus creating a municipality of unitary type. In 1974 a parish from the dissolved municipality Östra Ljungby was added.

Ängelholm was until recently the home of a major airforce base. The base is now closed down and the premises taken over by the sports car manufacturer Koenigsegg.

A notable landmark is the UFO memorial at Ängelholm. It is a model of a flying saucer, situated on a site where a UFO allegedly landed 18 May 1946.

== Localities ==
There are 9 urban areas (also called a tätort, or locality) in Ängelholm Municipality.

In the table the localities are listed according to the size of the population as of 31 December 2005. The municipal seat is in bold characters.

#	Locality	Population
1	**Ängelholm**	22,533
2	Munka-Ljungby	2,877
3	Vejbystrand 1)	2,764
4	Strövelstorp	1,012
5	Hjärnarp	871
6	Skepparkroken	705
7	Svenstorp	238
8	Margretetorp	211
9	Höja	200

1) A minor part of Vejbystrand is in Båstad Municipality

== Demographics ==
This is a demographic table based on Ängelholm Municipality's electoral districts in the 2022 Swedish general election sourced from SVT's election platform, in turn taken from SCB official statistics.

In total there were 43,599 residents, including 34,038 Swedish citizens of voting age. 37.9% voted for the left coalition and 61.0% for the right coalition. Indicators are in percentage points except population totals and income.

Location	Residents	Citizen adults	Left vote	Right vote	Employed	Swedish parents	Foreign heritage	Income SEK	Degree
Location			%	%					
Ausås-Strövelstorp	2,314	1,637	28.3	70.7	83	80	20	27,401	29
Centrum N	1,756	1,489	37.3	62.0	83	80	20	24,047	34
Centrum S	1,650	1,482	38.6	60.2	78	86	14	24,615	38
Danielslund	1,915	1,648	35.3	63.6	82	88	12	29,425	53
Hjärnarp N	1,624	1,248	32.4	66.5	87	90	10	28,195	39
Hjärnarp S	1,487	1,073	36.5	63.2	86	87	13	27,092	35
Höja-Starby	1,432	1,079	26.8	71.8	83	87	13	27,680	36
Kungsgården	2,387	1,778	47.9	51.2	76	65	35	23,324	35
Magnarp	2,179	1,721	35.3	64.2	86	93	7	33,654	58
Munka Ljungby N	2,040	1,539	36.0	63.3	85	89	11	25,927	37
Munka Ljungby S	2,277	1,610	35.7	63.3	83	81	19	24,679	31
Nya Torg	1,688	1,397	43.5	55.6	78	75	25	21,846	32
Pomona	1,836	1,406	37.6	62.0	89	89	11	31,354	54
Rebbelberga	2,234	1,729	40.6	58.7	88	85	15	28,635	45
Skälderviken	1,614	1,243	34.8	64.2	83	91	9	32,773	56
Skörpinge	1,855	1,464	36.3	62.9	87	85	15	31,774	48
Sockerbruket	1,735	1,677	45.2	53.7	78	86	14	21,510	35
Södra Utmarken	2,462	1,833	44.2	55.2	84	89	11	28,046	43
Tåssjö-Össjö	2,411	1,831	30.1	68.8	84	89	11	25,991	31
Vejbystrand	2,262	1,846	39.8	59.0	83	89	11	27,453	50
Willan	2,110	1,577	46.1	51.7	71	62	38	19,561	30
Ängavången	2,331	1,731	43.5	54.4	81	77	23	26,522	43
Source: SVT

== International relations ==
The municipality is twinned with:

- Høje-Taastrup Municipality, Denmark
- Maaninka, Finland
- Dobele, Latvia
- Kamen, Germany (North Rhine-Westphalia)

== See also ==
- Linjeflyg flight 277
