= Vegeholm Castle =

Castle in Scania, Sweden

- Vegeholms slott
- Part of Sweden
- Ängelholm Municipality
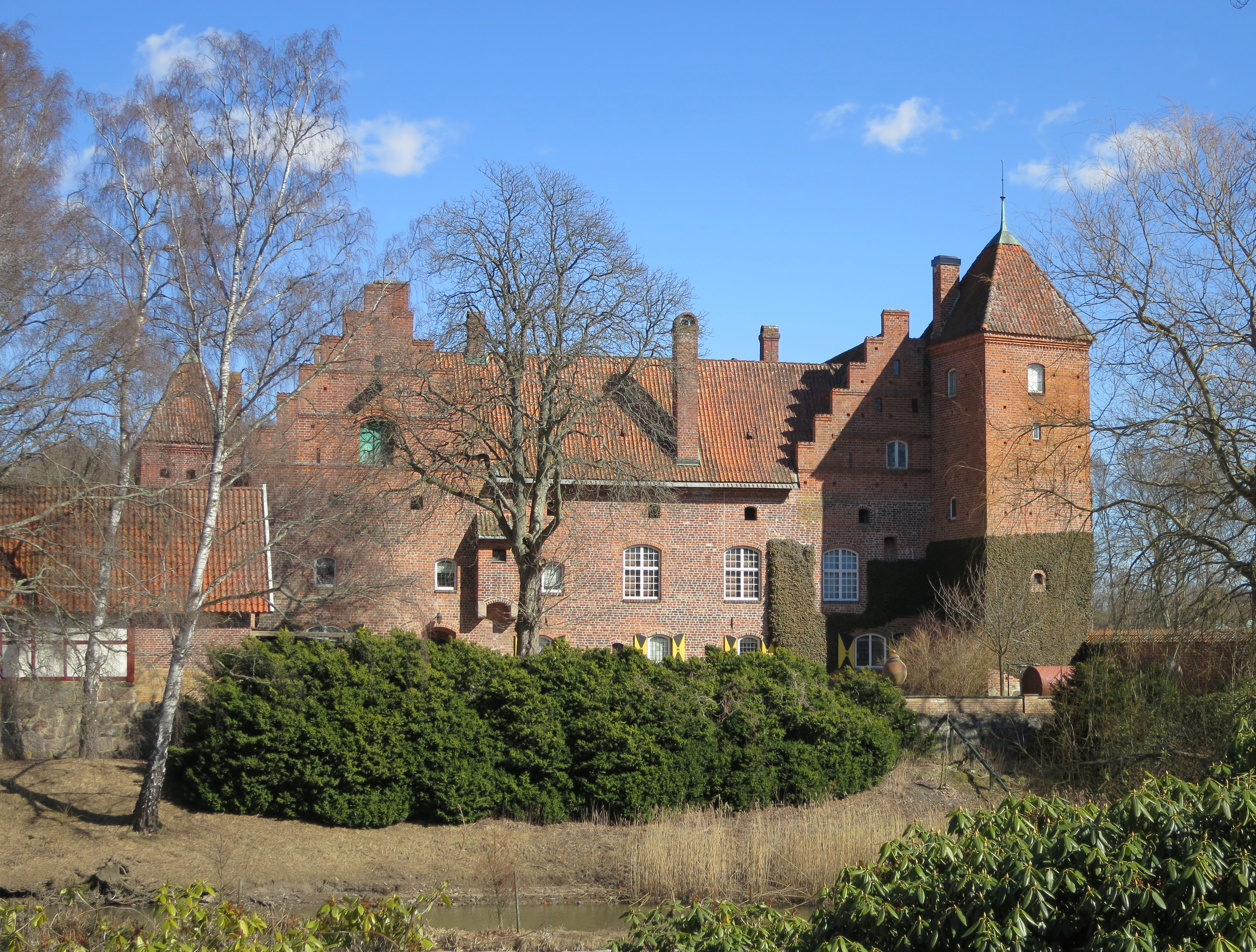
- Vegeholm Castle

Site information
- Type: Castle
- Owner: Von Geijer Family
- Open to the public: No

Location
- Scania, Sweden
- Location within Skåne
- Coordinates: 56.2058°N 12.8067°E

Site history
- Built: 16th century
- Built by: Tyge Krabbe

Vegeholm Castle (Swedish: Vegeholms slott) is located in Ängelholm Municipality in Scania, Sweden. The castle is a three-story stone house with a high, split roof that lies around an almost quadratic yard. In two corners there are large, square towers. On both sides of the north facade there are two free laying long buildings.

== History ==
Vegeholm was first built in the early 16th century and was burned in 1525. It was rebuilt again in 1530 by Danish nobleman Tyge Krabbe (1474-1541) who was Riksmarsk and commander at Helsingborg. It was owned by his family until 1663, when it was bought by Gustaf Otto Stenbock (1614–1685) who was governor general of Skåne, Halland and Blekinge. After his death it was first possessed by Olof Nilsson Engelholm and thereafter by Johan Cedercrantz. His family owned Vegeholm until 1814 when it was thoroughly renovated.

The manor changed owners several times in the 19th century. In the early 20th century it was bought by Wilhelmina and Walther von Hallwyl who gave it as a gift to their daughter Irma von Geijer and her husband Wilhelm von Geijer and restored and renovated it. Vegeholm is still owned and inhabited by members of the von Geijer family.

== See also ==
- List of castles in Sweden
