= Theodor von Hallwyl =

- Born: Theodor Hans Walther Hugo von Hallwyl; 24 July 1810; Breda, First French Empire (now Netherlands)
- Died: 13 December 1870 (aged 60); Rörswil Estate, Ostermundigen, Switzerland
- Occupations: Estate owner, painter, art collector, patron

Count Theodor Hans Walther Hugo von Hallwyl (24 July 1810 – 13 December 1870) was a Swiss nobleman, painter, estate owner, art collector and patron who laid the foundation for the Museum of Fine Arts Berne.

== Early life and education ==
Hallwyl was born 24 July 1810 in Breda, First French Empire (presently Netherlands), the second of seven children, to Count Karl Gabriel von Hallwyl (1778–1827), then Lieutenant colonel in the Regiment of Major General von Ziegler, No. 3 in Dutch service, and Countess Wilhelmine Rosa von Hallwyl (née de Goumoëns; 1783–1845).

His father was born at Hallwyl Castle in Hallwil, Switzerland, the ancestral seat of the family since the 12th century. Many of the Hallwyl including his father served in foreign military assignments.

== Personal life ==
In 1834, Hallwyl married Margaritha Cäcilia von Imhoff (1815–1893), a daughter of Abraham Balthasar von Imhoff (1773–1859) and Katharina Maria von Imhoff (née Haller; 1787–1863), who belonged to the Bernese Patriciate. They had three children;

- Hans Hugo von Hallwyl (1835–1909), married firstly Esther May (1840–1899) with whom he had two daughters, secondly to Austrian-born Hedwig Wilhelmine Josefa Styx, who was the nanny of his children.
- Johann Theodor Walther von Hallwyl (1839–1921), married firstly Adèle von Stackelberg, secondly
- Mathilde Agnes von Hallwyl (1857–1866)

Hallwyl passed away 13 December 1870 at Rörswil Estate aged 60.
