= Lilla Skuggan =

Area in Djurgården, Stockholm

Coordinates: 59.3672°N 18.0875°E

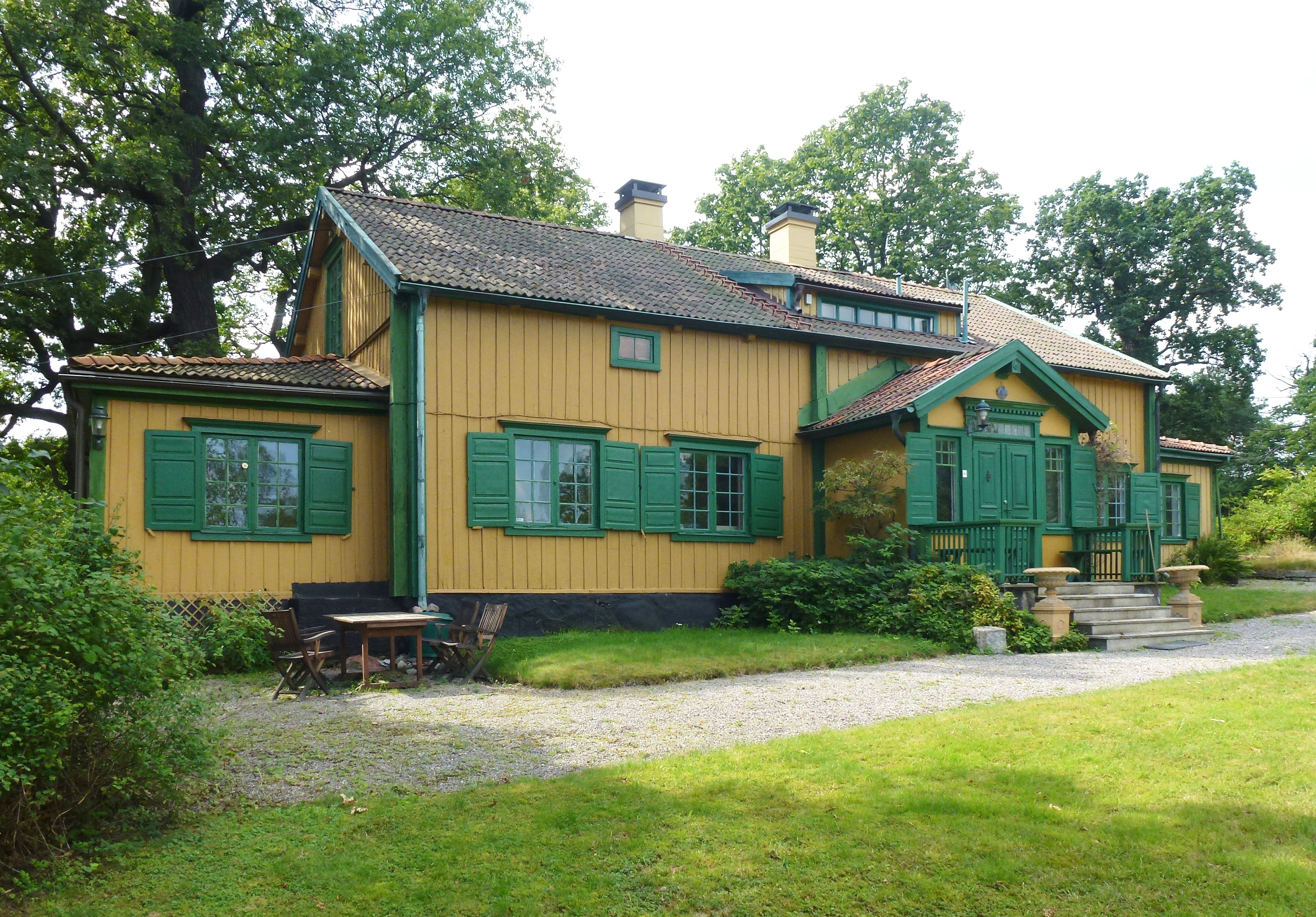
Main house at Lilla Skuggan, August 2014

Lilla Skuggan is an area in Djurgården, Stockholm. On a promontory which was previously known as Roslagsudden, it was developed in the late 18th century by Helena Quiding, who spent summers in the main house, which she called Heleneberg. Quiding was a friend of poet Carl Michael Bellman, and Heleneberg is frequently mentioned in his poems and songs.

The main house at Lilla Skuggan was later home to the architects Axel Nyström and Fredrik Wilhelm Scholander, the artist Julius Kronberg, and the financier Ivar Kreuger, who also owned the nearby Villa Ugglebo, a house which was built in the late 19th century by the architect Ferdinand Boberg and his wife, the artist Anna Boberg, and after them was the summer residence of the crown prince, the later King Gustaf VI Adolf. Lilla Skuggen is included in the Royal National City Park, and includes three houses, all of which are historic monuments, and a boathouse.

== History ==
The headland was originally the site of a gate in the fence enclosing the royal park which gave its name to Djurgården; in winter a road led across the ice-covered Lilla Värtan from there to Roslagen and Bogesundslandet. A royal huntsman lived there and guarded the gate. In 1788 the king's secretary, Johan Platin, received permission to build a summer residence near the beach there, with the royal huntsman Olof Bures having the right to use some rooms in the winter half of the year. The property was to revert to the Crown without compensation after 25 years.

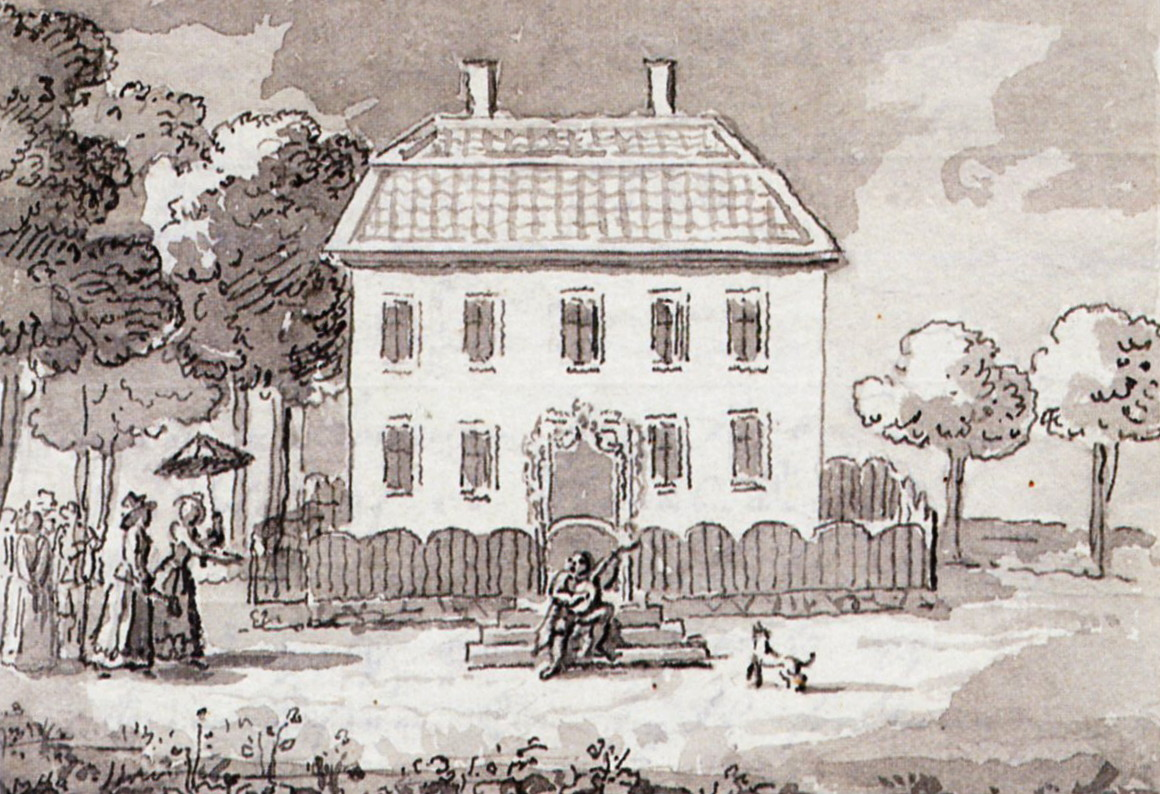
Helena Quiding's house Heleneberg on 31 July 1792, by Pehr Hilleström; Carl Michael Bellman sits on the front steps greeting her with music on her name day.

In 1790 Helena Quiding took over the house, naming it Heleneberg for her mother's maiden name, Helene Berg. She had inherited considerable wealth and, calling the existing property "so miserable, hemmed about with trees and rock-strewn that it could not be put to any purpose", had the house remodelled for 1,300 riksdaler. A wash drawing by Pehr Hilleström shows the remodelled house in 1792 as a two-storey wooden, plastered building with a split hipped roof. The grounds were cleared of rocks and trees, making them "both useful and neat", in the words of Johan Gabriel Oxenstierna. Quiding continued to rebuild and add to the house over the years, so that the original building probably remained only as its core.

Carl Michael Bellman was one of Quiding's friends and wrote poetry about her and his visits to Heleneberg; she and the house are said to have inspired many of his so-called "Djurgård pastorales".

For ten years Quiding spent her summers at Heleneberg, living in the winter in her parents' large house in Drottninggatan, which she had inherited in 1790. However she then transferred ownership of the Lilla Skuggan house to Lovisa C. Schönherr, the widow of a silk manufacturer. Abraham Niclas Edelcrantz, who lived nearby at Stora Skuggan, claimed a hundred-year lease on Lilla Skuggan and Quiding gave up on reaching an agreement with him. Edelcrantz, who was King Gustav III's private secretary and handled the Crown's petty cash, supposedly used to say to colleagues concerning bills, which it was not felt to be urgent to pay, "We'll put this in the shadows" (Swedish: skuggan), the source of the names Lilla Skuggan (little shadows) and Stora Skuggan (big shadows).

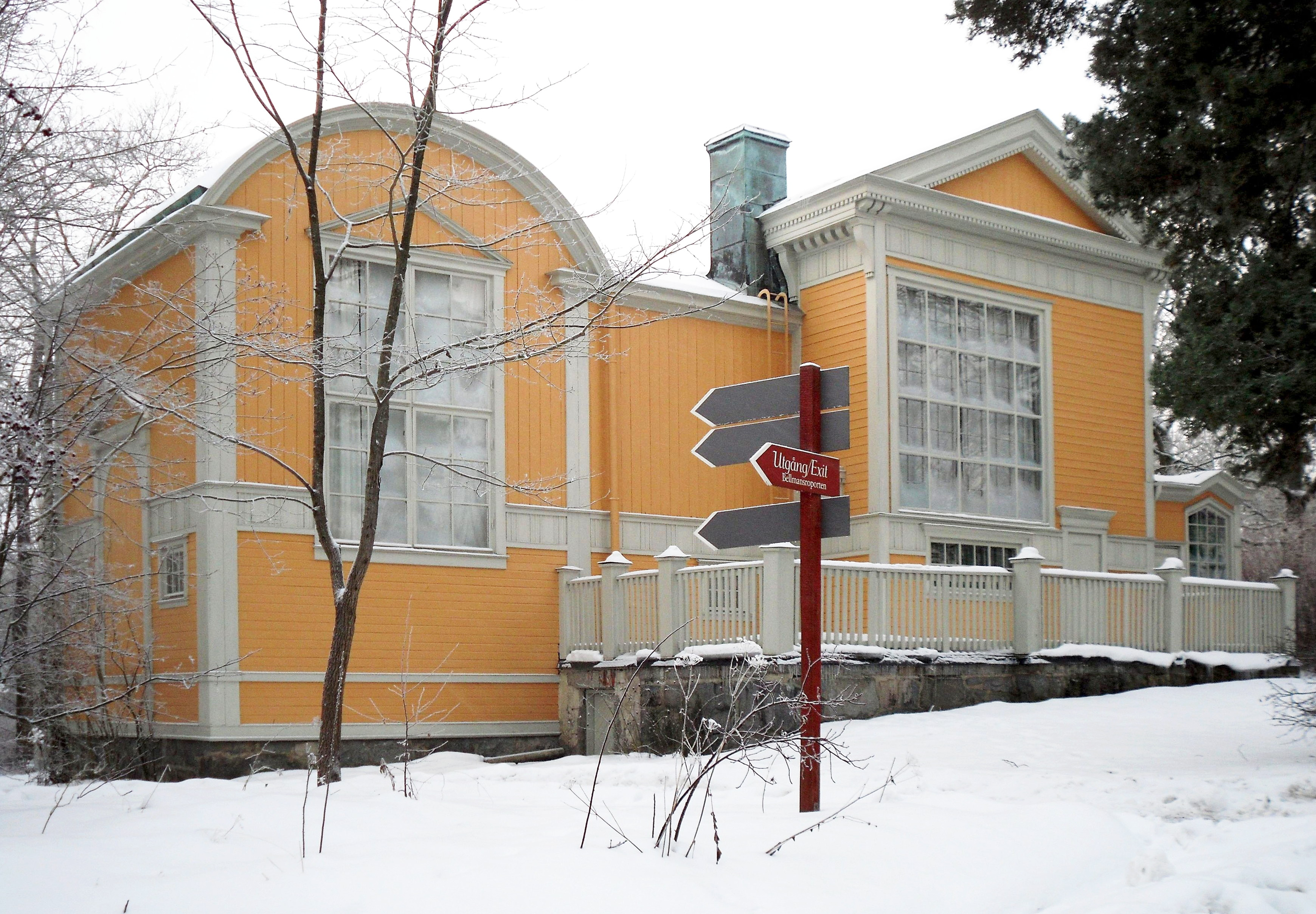
Julius Kronberg's studio, now at Skansen

In the second half of the 19th century, the house at Lille Skuggan was the summer residence first of the architect Axel Nyström, and then of his fellow architect Fredrik Wilhelm Scholander. Scholander's daughter Ellen married the artist Julius Kronberg, who became a permanent resident of Lilla Skuggen and had a studio built there in 1889 to his own design; it was completed in 1912 by the architect Jacob J:son Gate. A ceiling painting in the main house dates to Kronberg's residence there. Kronberg became known for his monumental works at Stockholm Palace and Hallwyl House, among others; after his death in 1921, Countess Wilhelmina von Hallwyl bought the studio and all its furnishings and donated it to the open-air museum at Skansen. A photograph of the interior is on the cover of ABBA's album The Visitors.

Another daughter of Scholander, Anna, married the architect Ferdinand Boberg. She was a successful artist herself and in the 1890s the Bobergs became neighbours of the Kronbergs: they built a house in the north of Lilla Skuggan, on the shore of Lilla Värtan, which they called Ugglebo. When they acquired Vintra in South Djurgården, they sold Ugglebo to the then crown prince, later King Gustaf VI Adolf, who used it as a summer residence until 1919. That year the financier Ivar Kreuger bought Ugglebo as well as the rest of Lilla Skuggen; under his ownership the buildings acquired substantially the appearance they have today.

In 1940 Count Fabian Wrede and his wife Elsa became the new owners of Lille Skuggan; they later transferred possession to their daughter Agneta, who was married to Lars Evers. When she died in 1984, their children Henrik Evers and Christina Rangö inherited the property. In August 2012 it was put up for sale, with the expressed wish that the houses not be sold separately.

== Area and buildings today ==
Lilla Skuggan is reached by Lilla Skuggans väg, which runs past the now drained lake called Lillsjön. Stora Skuggan is to the west of it, Fisksjöäng to the south, and Lappkärrsberget to the north. The oldest building in the Royal National City Park, Charles XI's fishing hut, dating to the 1680s, is nearby in Fiskartorpet.

The boathouse is down at the lakeside. The other three buildings, all on the historic register, all have wood-panelled walls painted yellow with green details. There is also a small gazebo. The main house (Lilla Skuggans väg 73) stands highest on the slope and is largest, with 276 square metres (2,970 sq ft) of living space. Lilla Skuggans väg 71, to the south, has 133 square metres (1,430 sq ft) and Lilla Skuggans väg 75, below that to the east, has 77 square metres (830 sq ft).

Buildings at Lilla Skuggan

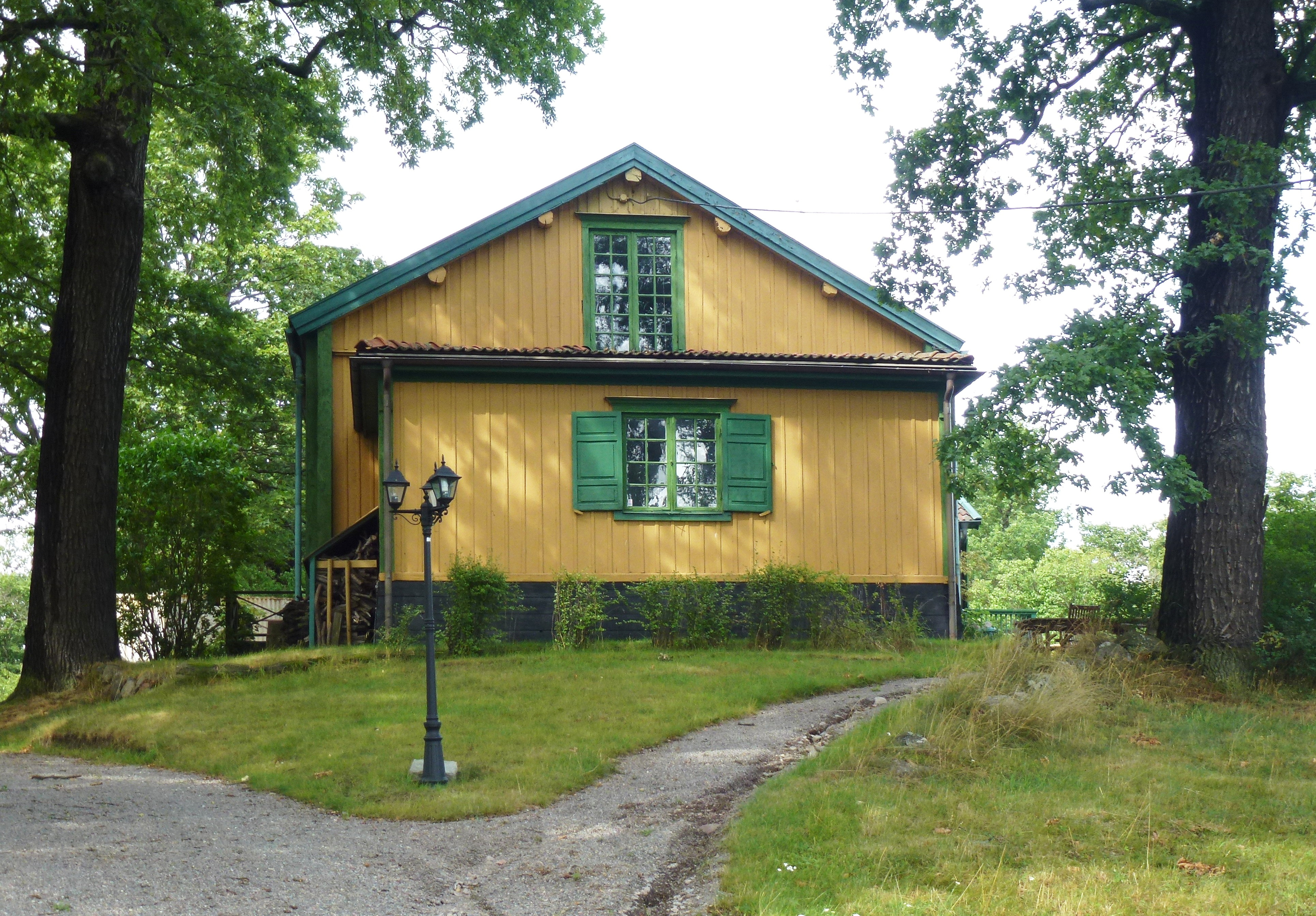
Gable end of the main house, the former Heleneberg

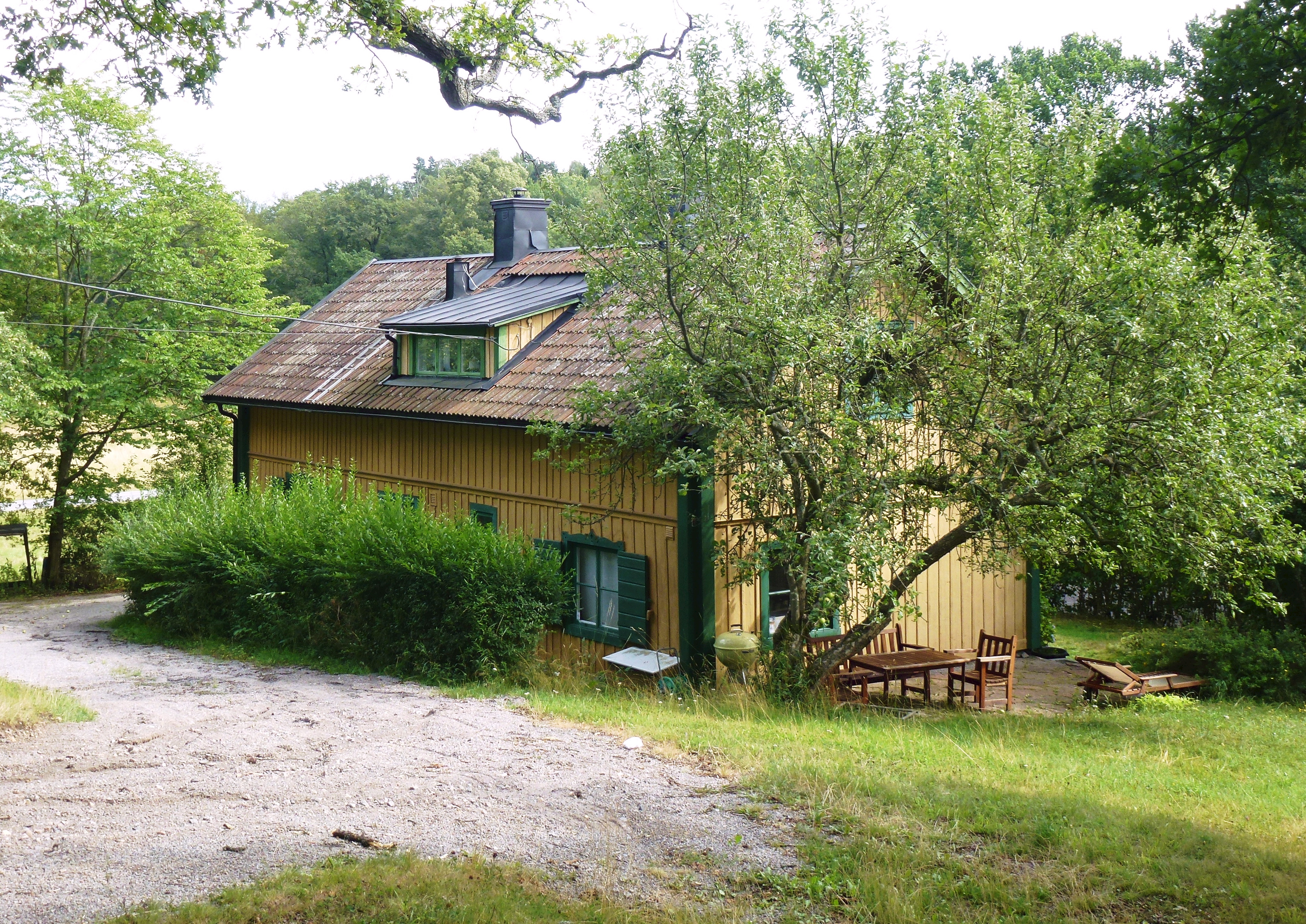
Lilla Skuggans väg 71

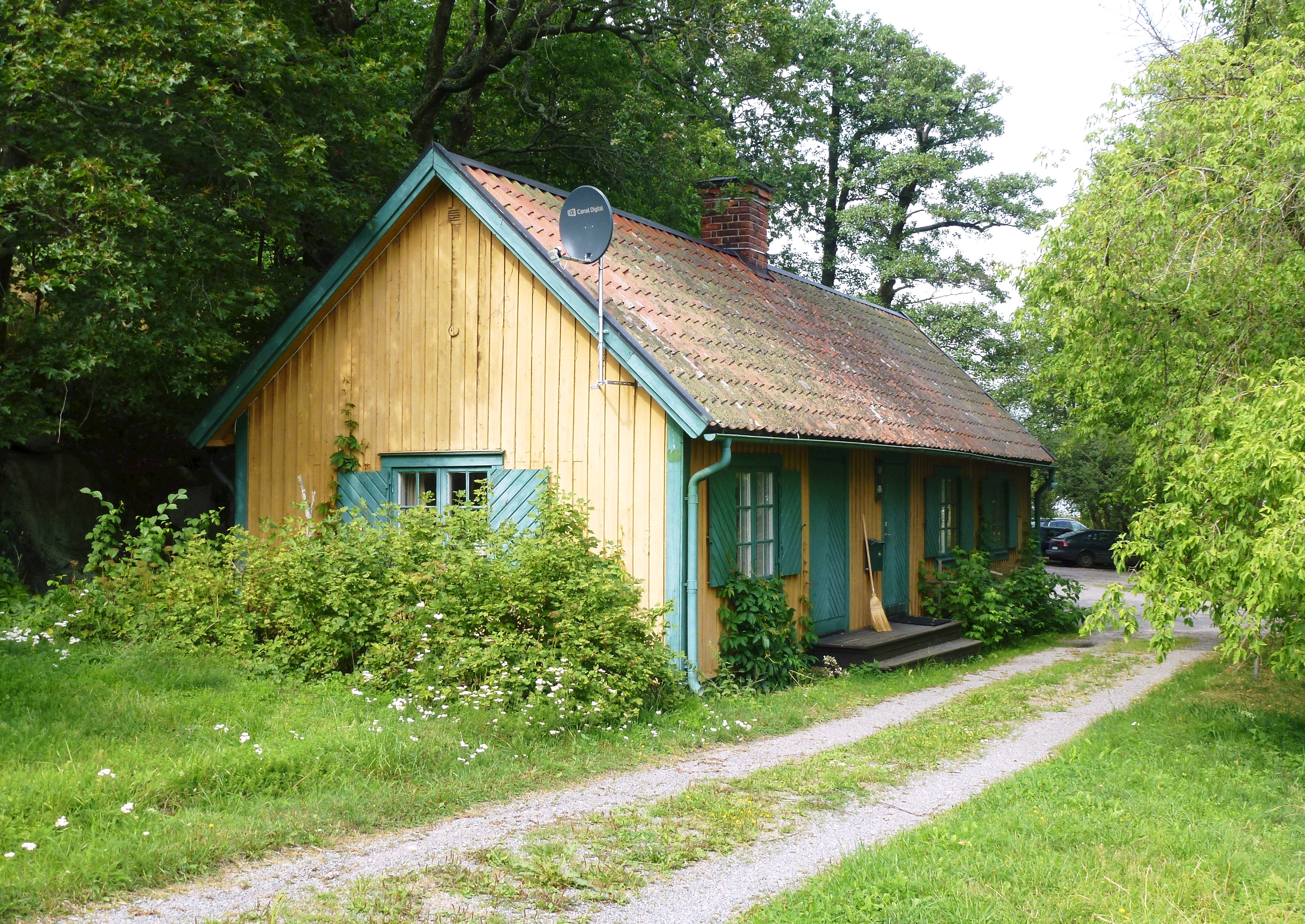
Lilla Skuggans väg 75

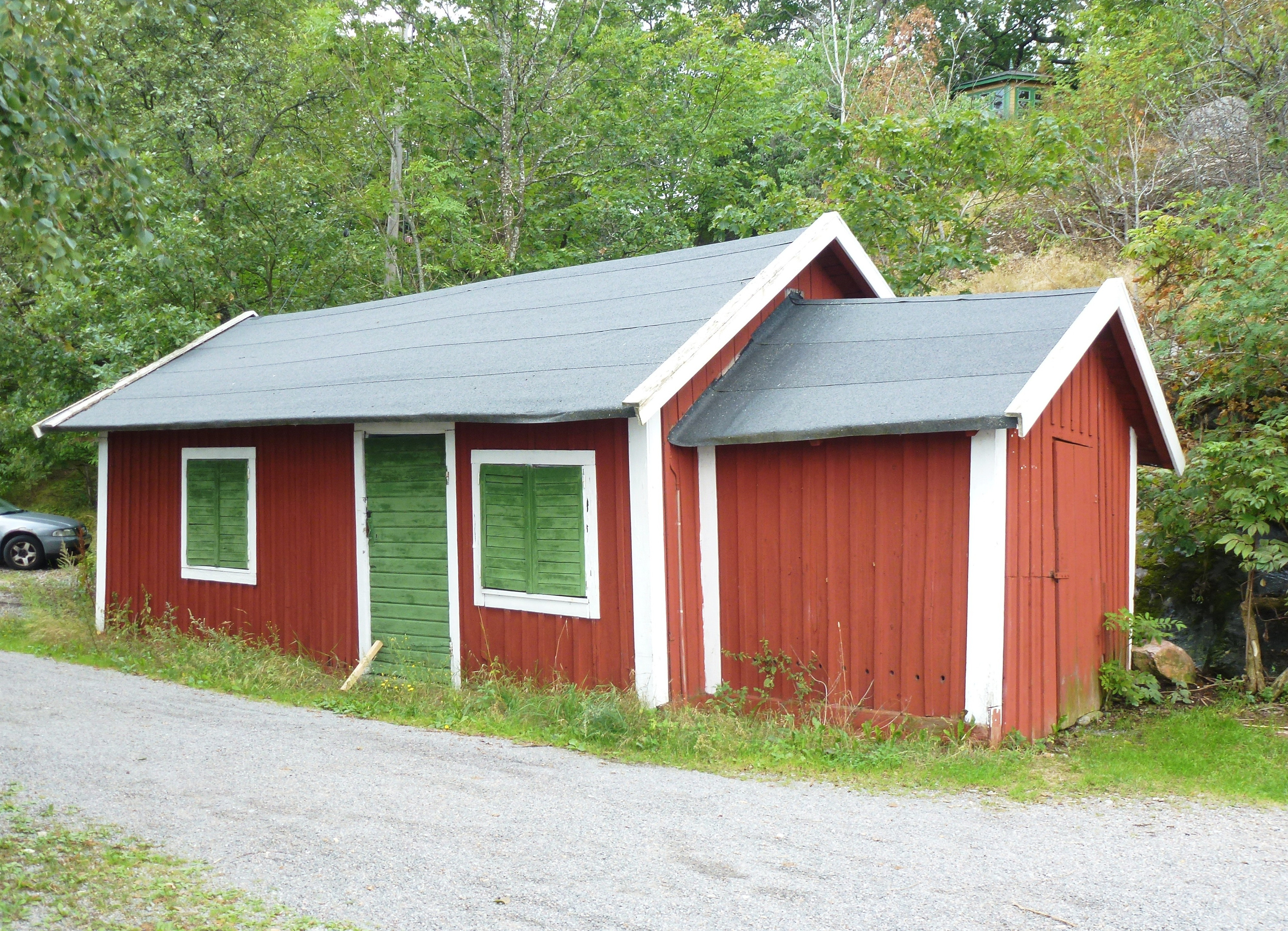
Boathouse (gazebo visible above)
