= Walther von Hallwyl =

- Hallwyl portrayed by Charles-Édouard Boutibonne in 1865

Member of the First Chamber of Riksdag
- In office 1897–1905
- Constituency: Gävleborg County

Personal details
- Born: Walther von Hallwyl; 26 January 1839 Bern, Switzerland
- Died: 27 February 1921 (aged 82) Stockholm, Sweden
- Spouse(s): Adèle von Stackelberg (m. 1861; died 1863) Wilhelmina Kempe (m. 1865)
- Relations: Hans von Hallwyl (brother)
- Children: Ebba; Ellen; Irma
- Occupation: Businessman, politician, philanthropist

Walther von Hallwyl (26 January 1839 – 27 February 1921) was a Swiss-born Swedish nobleman, businessman, philanthropist and politician who served on the First Chamber of the Swedish Riksdag for Gävleborg County. He was the co-founder of Hallwyl Museum.

== Early life and education ==
Hallwyl was born 26 January 1839 in Bern, Switzerland, the younger son, of Theodor von Hallwyl (1810–1870), painter, art collector and estate owner, and Margaretha Cécile von Hallwyl (née von Imhoff; 1815–1893), into Swiss nobility.

He was raised among his older brother, Hans von Hallwyl, at the Rörswil estate, which his father acquired from his in-laws in 1850. They were raised in musically and artistically interested household, his fathers art collection ultimately becoming the foundation for the Museum of Fine Arts Berne.

== Personal life ==
In 1861, Hallwyl firstly married to Countess Adèle von Stackelberg, who passed away without issue already in 1863.

Subsequently, he married secondly to Wilhelmina Kempe (1844–1930), the only daughter of Wilhelm Kempe and Johanna Kempe (née Wallis; 1818–1909), an affluent timber merchant. They had four daughters:

- Ebba Johanna Cecilia von Hallwyl (1866–1960), a women's right activist, married Wilhelm von Eckermann (1853–1937), a businessman and politician, of old Mecklenburg stock. They had three children.
- Ellen Fredrika Vilhelmina von Hallwyl (1867–1952), a sculptor, married firstly to Henrik de Maré (1860–1937), a military officer. She married secondly to Johnny Roosval, an art historian and professor, withom she had a son.
- Elma von Hallwyl (1870–1871), died in childbed.
- Irma Ingeborg Matilda von Hallwyl (1873–1959), a socialite, who married Wilhelm von Geijer, miliary officer and estate owner. With issue.

Hallwyl died 27 February 1921 in Stockholm, Sweden aged 82.
