= Kahn Lectures =

The Kahn Lectures were series of lectures that took place from 1929 to 1931 at the Department of Art and Archaeology of Princeton University, sponsored by the New York banker Otto Hermann Kahn (1867–1934). Kahn had funded visits by European scholars to Princeton since 1925, and the new lectures were announced as a continuation of the earlier ones.

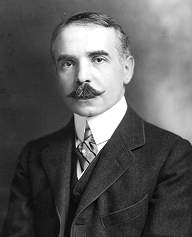
Otto Kahn

In 1923, shortly after Otto Kahn's son had entered Princeton, the banker was approached by the art historian Charles Rufus Morey, described by architectural historian Neil Levine as the prime mover of the Department of Art and Archaeology. Kahn agreed in 1924 to donate $1,500 a year for two years to finance extended visits by European scholars to the university. This was later extended for a third year.

The first of these scholars was the Russian classical scholar Michael Rostovtzeff, who had already settled in the United States in 1918, after the Russian revolution. His lectures were later published as The Animal Style in South Russia and China. The second was the French byzantinist Gabriel Millet, who held the chair for Æsthetics and Art History at the Collège de France. The third was the British archaeologist and hittitologist John Garstang.

After Kahn had become a member of the Visiting Committee of the department in 1927, he promised to continue supporting lectures there. These were to begin in 1928/29 and would run for five years. The donation was reported on the front page of The New York Times, which quoted Professor Morey's statement that the money would be used for the "continuation of the special lectures in art, archaeology, architecture and criticism which were initiated two years ago with Mr. Kahn's help". The report described the intended plan for "a course of eight lectures on different subjects given each year by a distinguished authority in his own field, while special emphasis will be placed on the selection of subjects not included in the Princeton curriculum."

After considering Arthur Pillans Laurie, Eugénie Sellers Strong and Herbert Joseph Spinden, the department settled on the Swedish art historian Johnny Roosval, professor at Stockholm University, as the first lecturer. Roosval's lectures on Swedish art, described by Levine as "apparently not very exciting", were published in 1932. According to Levine, Roosval had been asked to extend his lectures to the modern architecture of Sweden, an area outside the expertise of the Swedish scholar, who was known for his studies of medieval art.

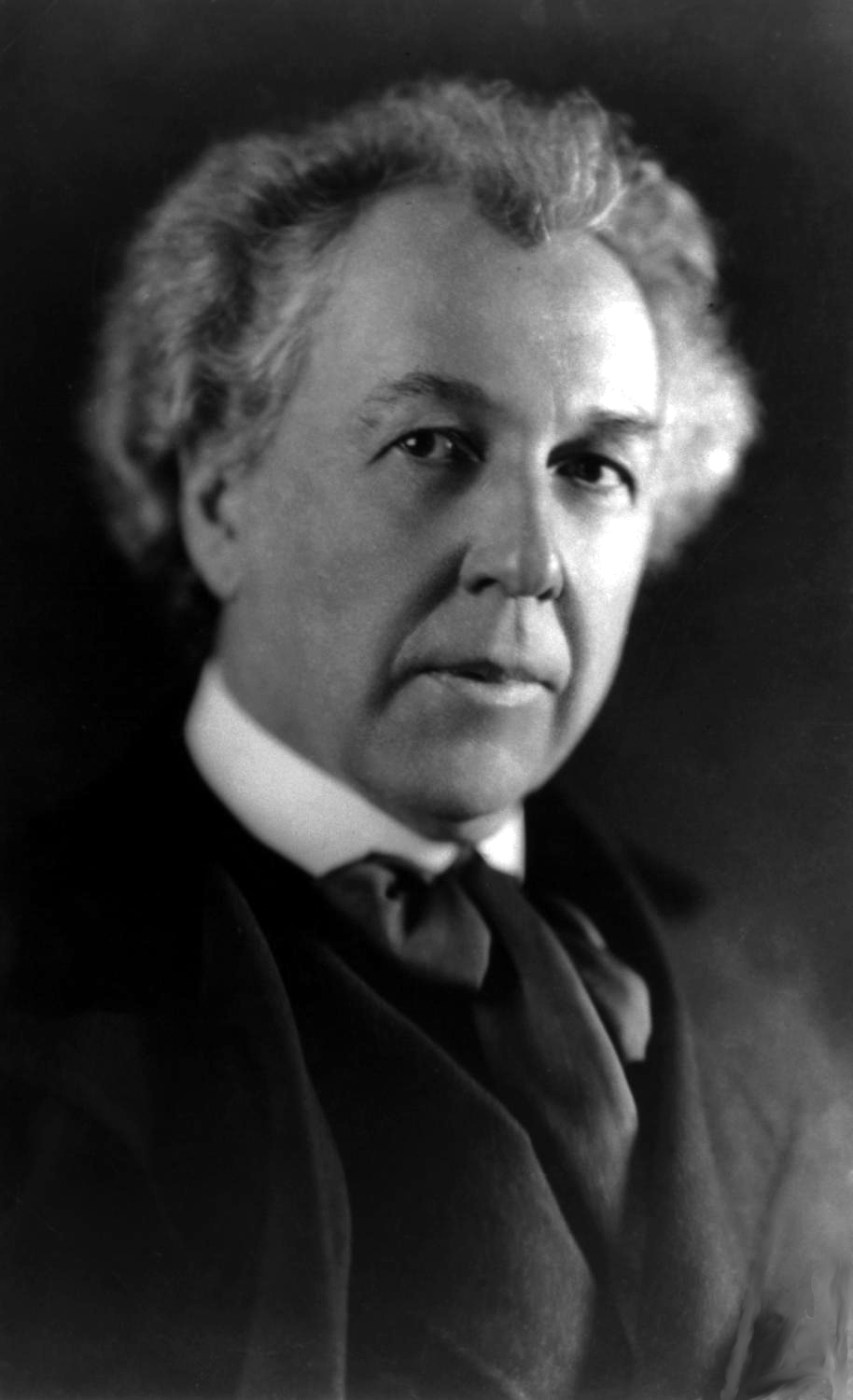
Frank Lloyd Wright

For the second round of lectures, Morey originally invited the Dutch architect J.J.P. Oud, "a star in the rising pantheon of younger European architects". Morey had been influenced in this choice by an article on Oud by Henry-Russell Hitchcock in the magazine The Arts in February 1928. Oud accepted, although he would have preferred to hold his lectures later in the spring than was possible, but ultimately he had to cancel because of illness (one of his frequent periods of depression). After once again considering H. J. Spinden, Baldwin Smith, who was acting chair of the Department during Morey's absence in Europe, invited Frank Lloyd Wright. Wright had recently published a number of pieces on architectural theory, but had little to do at the time, and the recent Wall Street crash had made it look unlikely that he would get any new commissions for the time being. Despite this, Levine suggests that Wright's reason for accepting the offer was not primarily financial, but rather the "prestige of the venue and the bully pulpit it would afford him". According to the original donation by Kahn, each series was to consist of eight lectures, but Wright proposed that he would instead hold six lectures and arrange an exhibition of his own recent work "illustrating the ideas and principles involved in the ‘course'". According to Levine, Wright's Kahn lectures gave him a new and important experience and even "opened a new career path" for the architect, who continued to lecture extensively at universities and other institutions for the next year. His exhibition toured America in 1930 and Europe for six months in 1931. Wright's lectures were originally published in 1931 in the Princeton monograph series for art and archaeology. They were reprinted in 1987, and a new edition, with an introduction by Harvard professor Neil Levine, was published in 2008. In a contemporary review of the first edition of Wright's lectures, the critic Catherine Bauer described the book as "the very best book on modern architecture that exists".

The next two series of lectures in the series were held in January 1931 by Herbert Joseph Spinden, the expert in pre-Columbian American archaeology who had already been considered twice before, and in the fall of 1931 by Edward Denison Ross, director of (what was still known as) the School of Oriental Studies of the University of London, who talked about Persian art. Neither of these were published. Ross's lectures were described by Baldwin Smith as "rather flat, as the Englishman thought he could chat along pleasantly on most anything to an American audience." For the fifth round of lectures, the department invited the French architectural historian Marcel Aubert, but he had to cancel after a scheduling conflict appeared with his lectures at Yale. Morey suggested to Kahn that the remaining funds be given to a student in need. Because of the financial losses Kahn had sustained during the preceding years, he could not renew his gift. Otto Kahn died two years later.

== Summary list of Kahn lecturers ==
- Johnny Roosval on Swedish art, Spring 1929
- Frank Lloyd Wright on Modern architecture, 1930
- Herbert Joseph Spinden on Central American Art and Archaeology, January 1931
- Edward Denison Ross on Persian art, Fall 1931
- Marcel Aubert was booked for 1932, but had to cancel

== Bibliography ==
- Unsigned, "Otto H. Kahn gives funds to Princeton to aid art", The New York Times, 30 April 1928.
- Levine, Neil, "Introduction" to: Frank Lloyd Wright, Modern Architecture: Being the Kahn Lectures for 1930. New edition. Princeton: Princeton University Press, 2008, p. ix-lxxi.
