= Wilhelmina von Hallwyl =

Swedish collector and donor

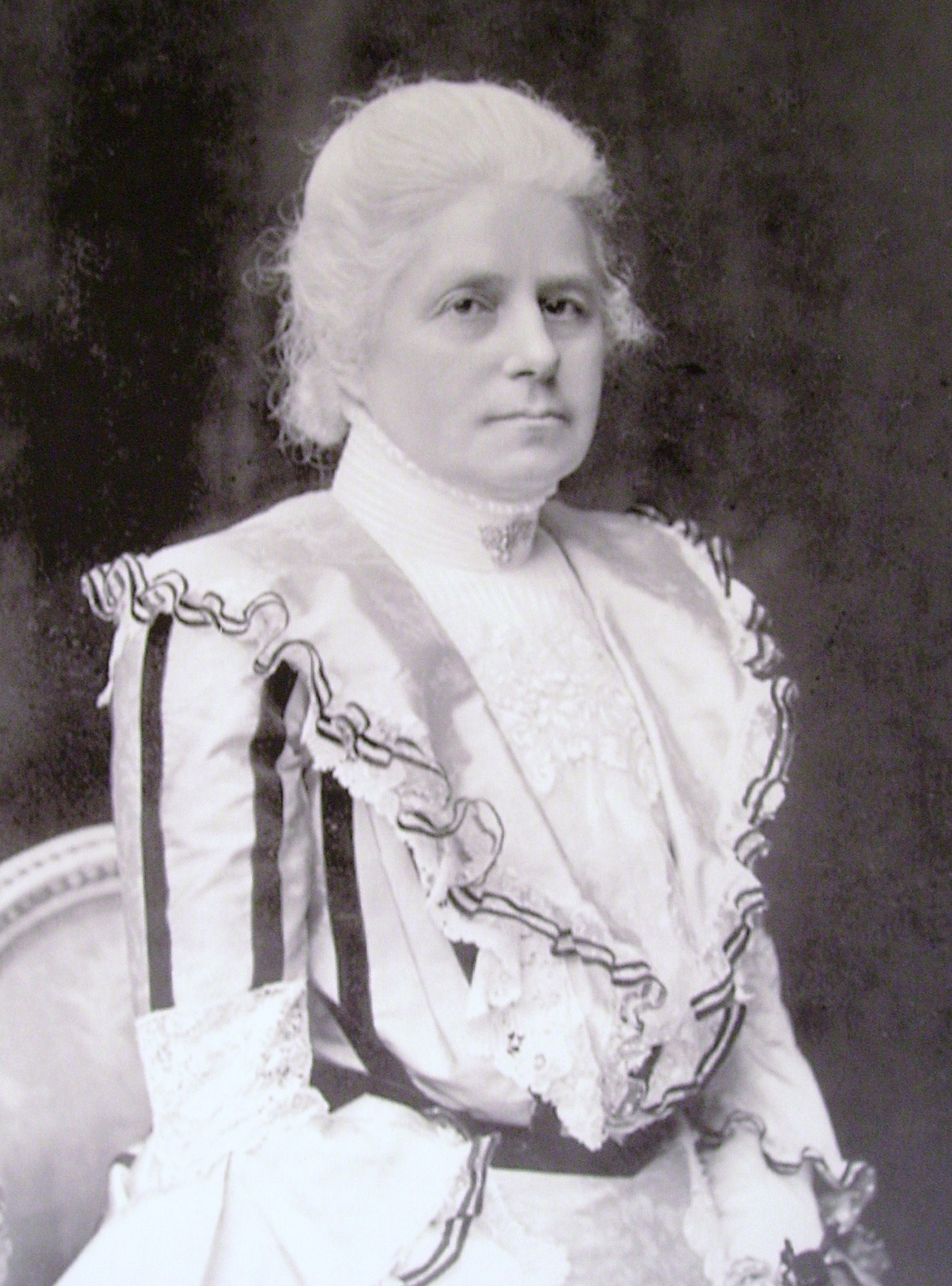
Wilhelmina von Hallwyl

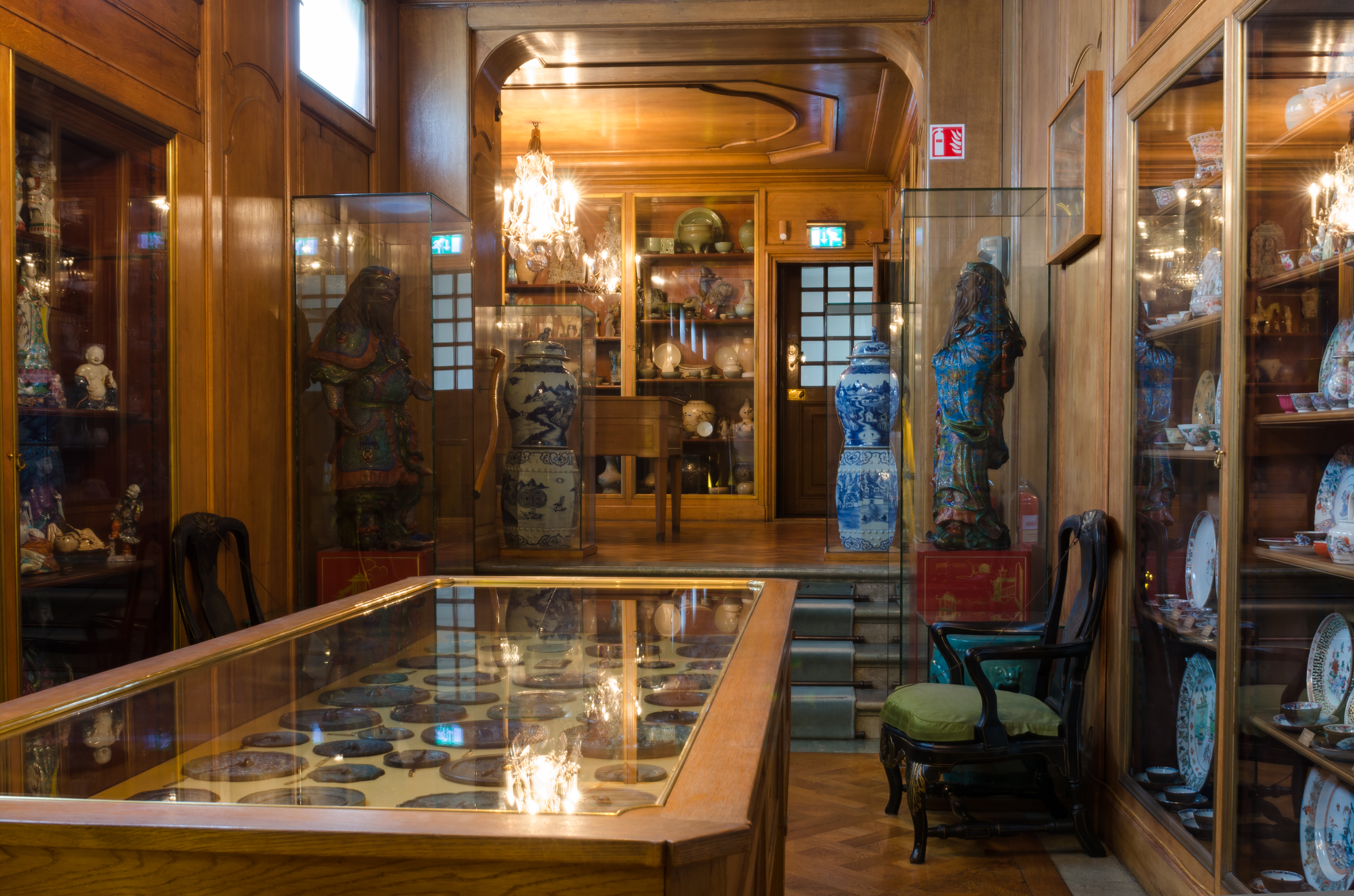
The porcelain room of Hallwyl House

Anna Fridrica Wilhelmina von Hallwyl (née Kempe; 1 October 1844 − 25 July 1930) was a Swedish collector and donor whose accumulation of art and other objects constitute the current Hallwyl Museum in Stockholm.

== Biography ==
Wilhelmina was born in Stockholm, the only child and heiress of the wealthy timber-merchant Wilhelm Kempe of Ljusne-Woxna AB. At the age of 20, she married the Swiss-born Count Walther von Hallwyl (1839–1921), a captain in the Swiss general staff who later became a Swedish citizen. Hallwyl succeeded his father-in-law as general manager of Ljusne-Woxna and was a member of the Swedish riksdag (Första kammaren, literally "First Chamber") 1897–1905.

Her family's wealth enabled the young Wilhelmina Kempe to cultivate an interest in collecting art and antiques, and she would pick up objects here and there while travelling with her parents. This interest continued after her marriage and was to remain her main passion throughout her life. Her collection was eventually to contain a large number of pieces of European and East Asian fine and decorative art, as well as arms and armour, books and manuscripts.

Having lived for some time at Ericslund Manor, near Trosa, and in rented accommodation in Stockholm, the Hallwyls commissioned Isak Gustaf Clason to build them a private town house, the current Hallwyl Museum next to Berzelii Park in central Stockholm, begun in 1893 and completed in 1898. Behind Clason's Venetian-influenced façade, the rooms were decorated in various historical styles. Paintings and tapestries were initially hung on the walls of the apartments, but the attic eventually had to be converted to a dedicated gallery for the growing collection of pictures.

The entire house and all its contents were eventually given as a gift to the Swedish state. The donation had been announced in 1921 but took effect only on the death of the countess in 1930, and the house remained closed to the public until 1938, after the completion of the catalogue of the entire contents of the house. The intention was to document and preserve the whole house exactly as it had been left, both the collections of arts and antiques, and the contemporary furniture, textiles and everyday household objects used by the family and its servants, such as clothing, kitchen utensils and office equipment. In addition to the objets d'art are personal items such as a piece of the Count's beard and a slice of their wedding cake.

The catalogue had been initiated by Countess von Hallwyl while the collection was still growing; from 1909, she employed a number of renowned experts on subjects such as European painting, Chinese bronzes, European and East Asian porcelain to assist her in the work. In its final version the detailed catalogue was to contain approximately 50,000 entries, and it was eventually printed in 79 volumes between 1926 and 1957.

She also arranged for the archaeological investigation and restoration of her husband's ancestral home, Schloss Hallwil, Aargau, for which she established a trust, Hallwil-Stiftung. Her other donations included the Hallwyl professorship of ethnology at Nordiska museet and Stockholm University.

Of the Hallwyls' three surviving daughters (a fourth died in infancy), two are more known to history. The eldest, Ebba von Eckermann, is known as a social activist and philanthropist. The middle one, Ellen, a sculptor, married the diplomat Henrik de Maré and was the mother of Rolf de Maré, founder of the Ballets suédois. After a scandalous divorce, Ellen remarried the art historian Johnny Roosval.
