= Ebba von Eckermann =

Swedish women's rights activist

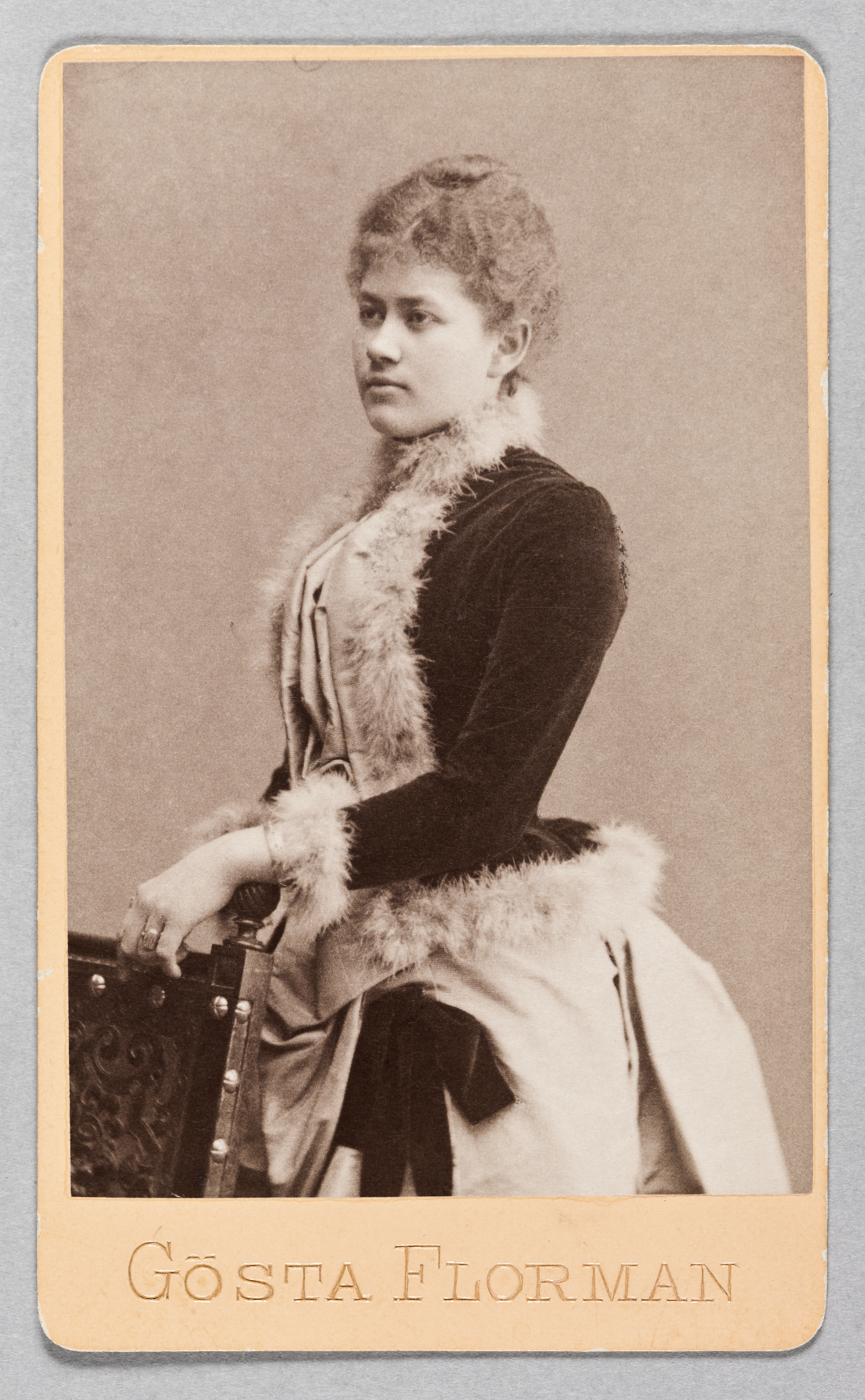
Ebba von Hallwyl - Hallwylska museet - 89071

Ebba Johanna Cecilia von Eckermann née von Hallwyl (21 May 1866 – 16 October 1960) was a Swedish women's rights activist.

Ebba von Eckermann was the daughter of Walther and Wilhelmina von Hallwyl and sister of Ellen Roosval von Hallwyl. She was a student of the Wallinska skolan in 1882–1884, and had the wish to continue to study architecture at the university; her parents, however, disagreed and wished for her to follow custom, and instead, she was introduced in high society to find a husband. In 1886 she married the noble officer and courtier Wilhelm von Eckermann.

von Eckermann is known for the gatherings she hosted between educated women and working class women in her home: the purpose was for women from different classes to be acquainted and learn from each other. She was a central figure for the feminists and women's rights activists within more conservative right-wing circles.

Ebba von Eckermann was a member of the board and vice chairperson of the Fredrika Bremer Association, a member of the board of the hospitals Sophiahemmet and Eugeniahemmet, and engaged within the Red Cross and the Sveriges flickors scoutförbund (SFS) ('Swedish Girl Scouts'), and founded a household school (1913). She co-founded the women's association Stockholms Moderata Kvinnoförbund ('Moderate Women's Association of Stockholm'), which she chaired in 1912–1922, and co-founded the Sveriges moderata kvinnors riksförbund ('Swedish Moderate Women's Association') in 1915, which she chaired in 1915–1922.
