= Helena Quiding =

Swedish socialite

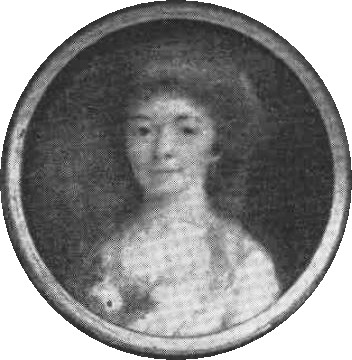
Helena Quiding in circa 1790, by the time she was the object of Bellman's poems.

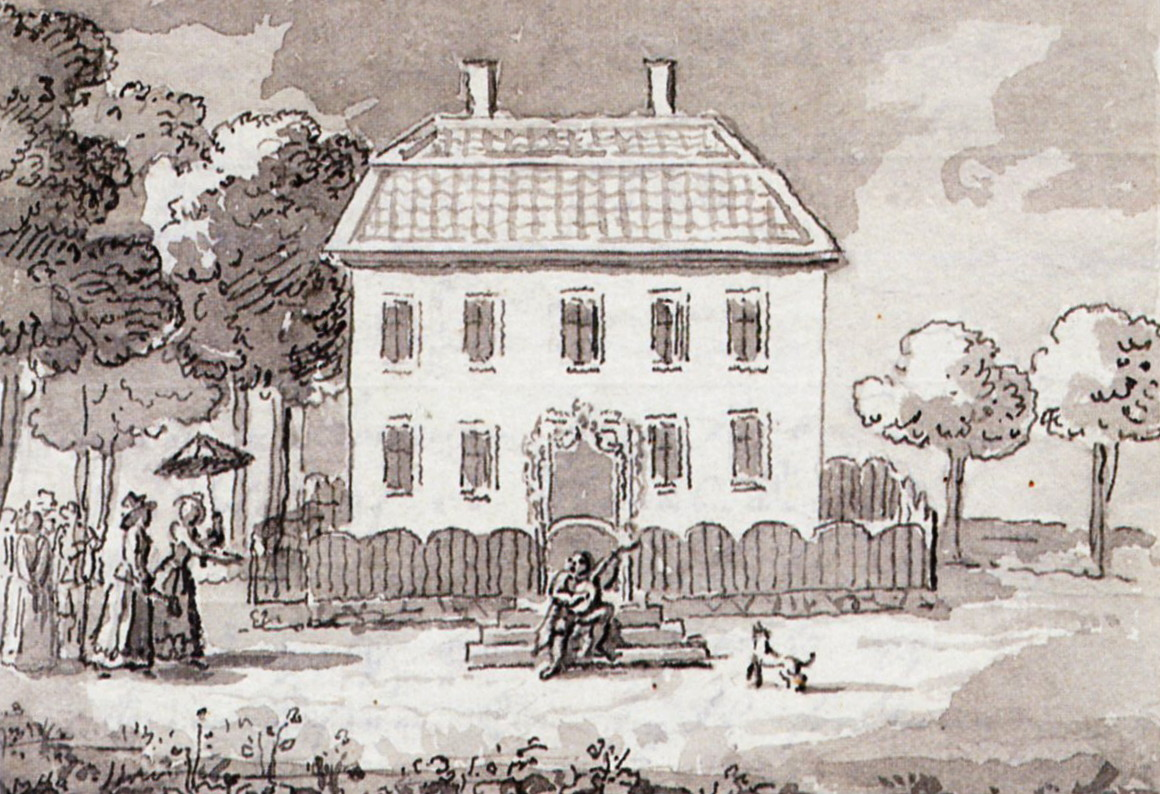
Heleneberg by Pehr Hilleström. Carl Michael Bellman welcomes Helena Quiding to Heleneberg the 31 July 1792.

Helena Quiding (19 August 1755 – 2 October 1819) was a Swedish cultural personality and socialite, the creator of Sommarvillan (also known as Sommarnöjet and during the 18th century as Heleneberg), a historic building at Lilla Skuggan in Djurgården, Stockholm. She was a friend of Swedish poet Carl Michael Bellman, and she and circle of friends at her summer house, then known as Heleneberg, is frequently mentioned in Bellman's poems and songs.

== Life ==
Quiding was the daughter of the wealthy brännvinmerchant Johan Henric Lindberg (1719–1777) and his wife Helena Berg (1729–1788). Her parents were wealthy and owned real estate on Drottninggatan and Fredsgatan in the centre of Stockholm.

She married in 1776 to the spicemerchant Bengt Christopher Quiding (1746–1797), and had a son, Bernhard Christopher (1778–1846). The marriage was happy, but her spouse wasted her dowry and the fortune she inherited after her father and apparently persuaded her to forge her rich mother's name to be able to borrow more money, before he went bankrupt and fled the country in 1781, being sentenced in absentia in 1783. As a married woman, Quiding was legally a minor and was not charged for the forgery, but she was obliged to give up all property to the creditors and settle with her son in the home of her mother. In 1788, she inherited a second fortune after her mother and filed for a divorce, and in January 1789, she was formally divorced from her spouse.

In 1790, the year after her divorce, she spent a fortune by having the summer villa Heleneberg built at Djurgården, where she engaged in gardening and entertained culture personalities such as Bellman during the summers for a decade. Helena Quding and her circle at Heleneberg was the object of many of the poems of Bellman, such as the Djurgårdspastoralerna (Djurgården pastorals). It is not known when she and Bellman became acquainted, but they were friends by the time of her divorce proceedings in 1788, and he often celebrated her with poems the following years, such as at the inauguration of Heleneberg. She is described as beautiful, warmhearted but serious, and her life at Heleneberg as idyllic. Apparently, Bellman unsuccessfully attempted to court her at one point, and it is likely that she gave him financial support from time to time. The summers at Heleneberg ended in 1800, after several years of lawsuits with her neighbor Abraham Niclas Edelcrantz, who questioned her rights to the grounds, when she sold it and started to rent a cottage to spend her summers instead.
