= Isak Gustaf Clason =

Swedish architect

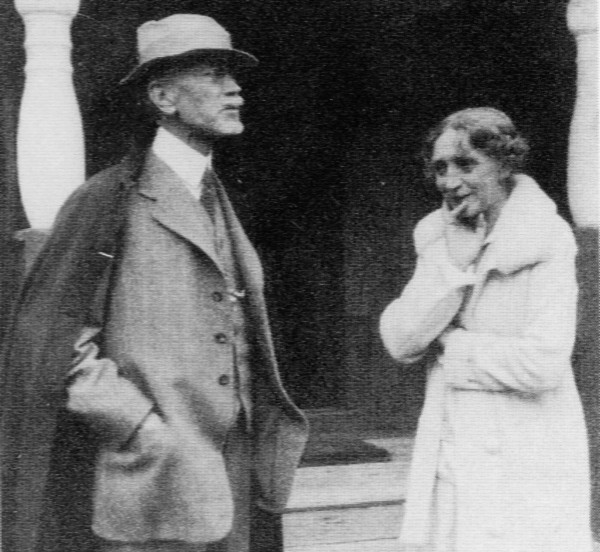
Clason with his wife, 1915

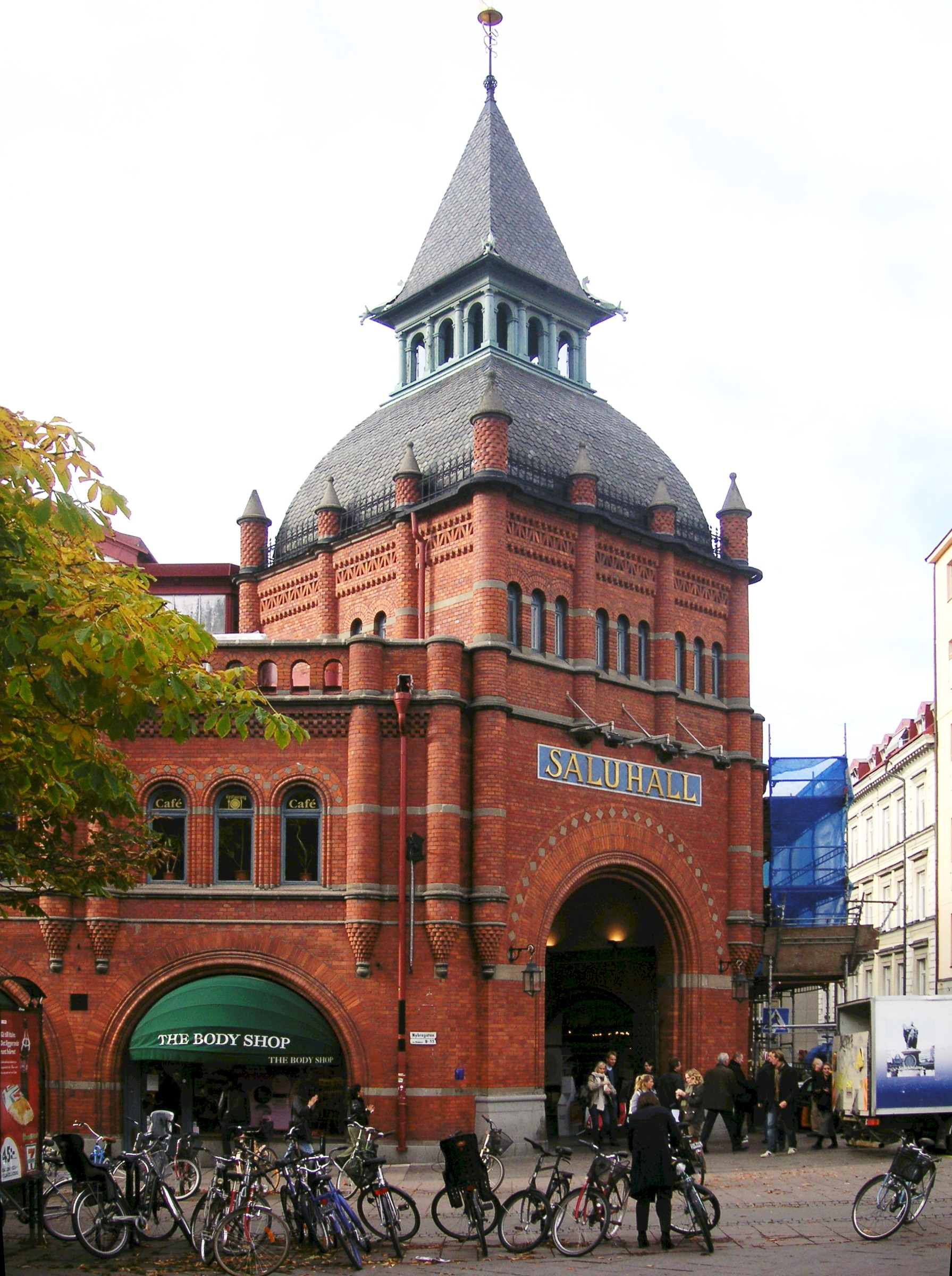
Östermalmshallen indoor market at Östermalmstorg

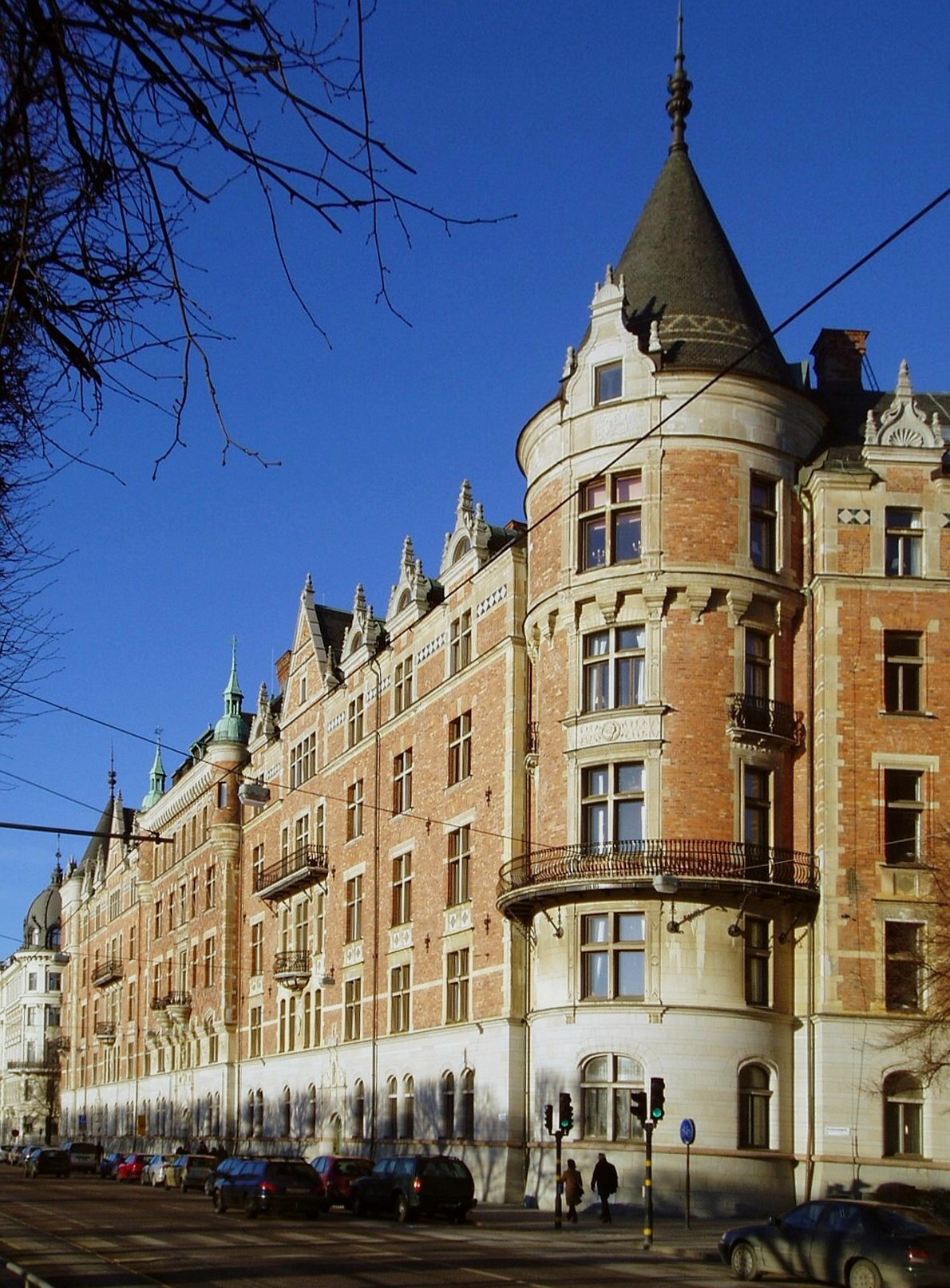
Bünsow House at Strandvägen

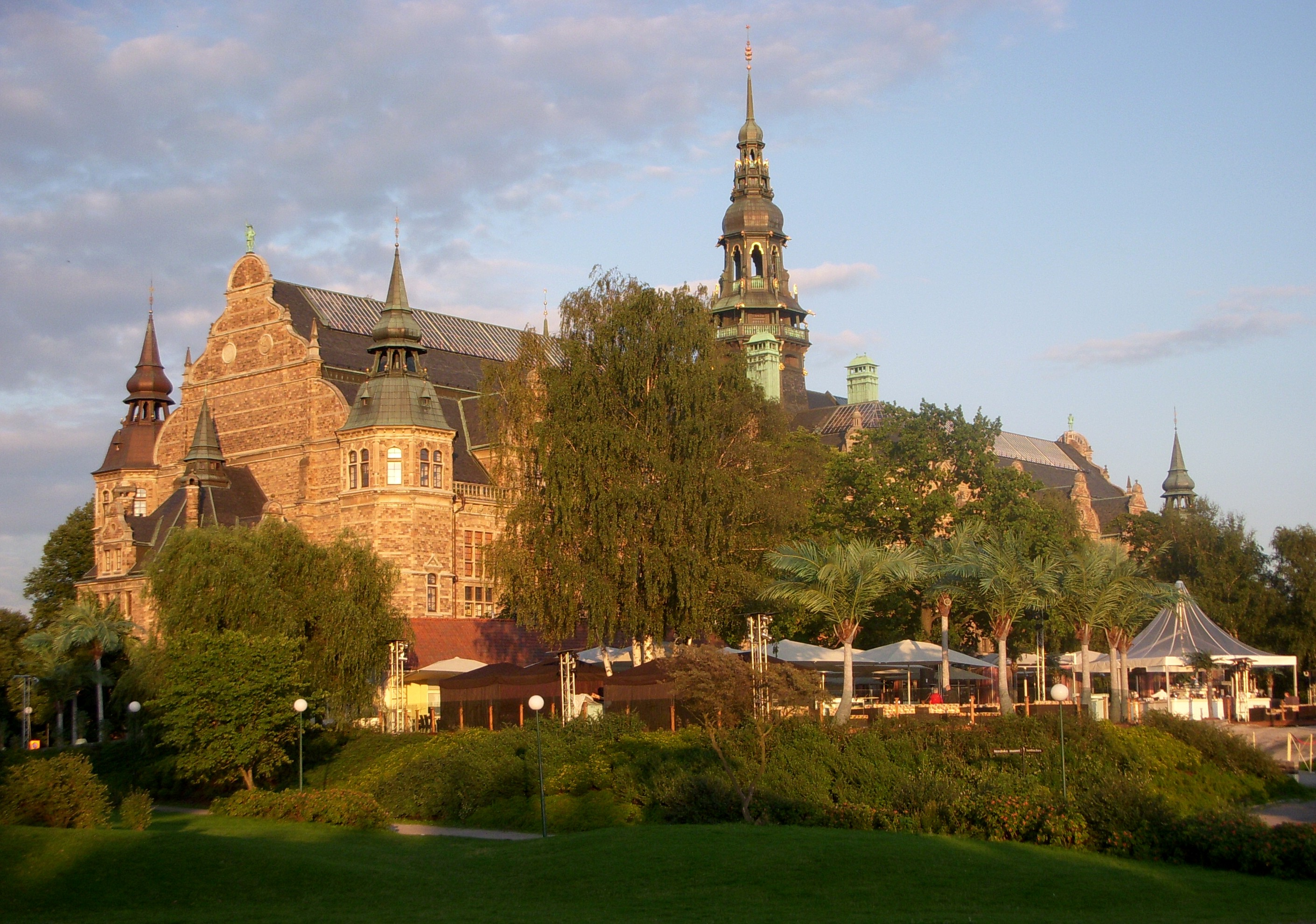
Nordiska Museum, Stockholm

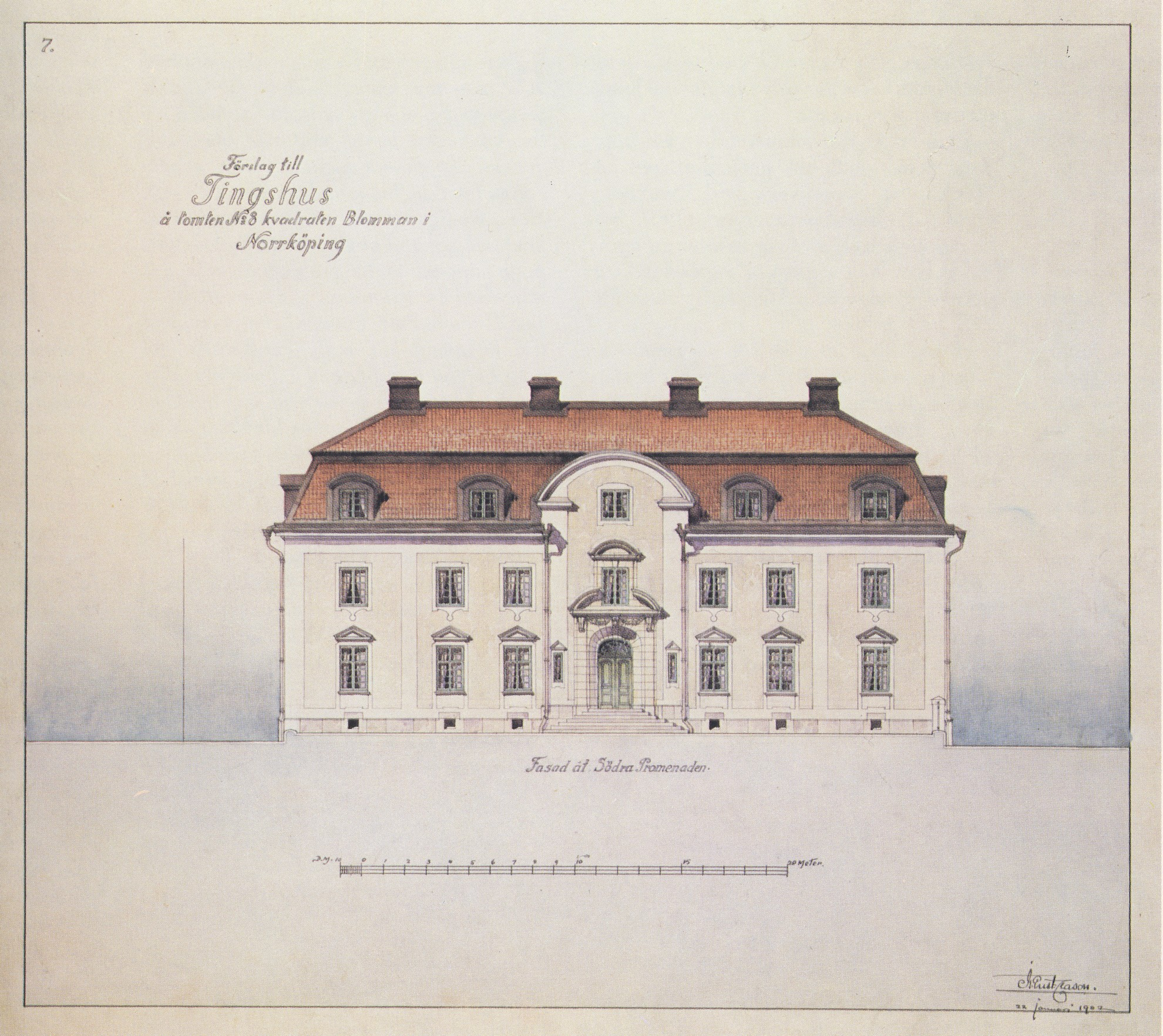
Original sketch to the courthouse in Norrköping

Isak Gustaf Clason (30 July 1856 Falun – 19 July 1930 Rättvik) was a Swedish architect.

== Biography ==
Clason studied engineering and later architecture at the Royal Institute of Technology in Stockholm, where he was a student of Albert Theodor Gellerstedt (1836-1914), and later at the architectural school of the Royal Swedish Academy of Arts, at the time headed by Fredrik Wilhelm Scholander (1816-1881). He received the royal medal in 1881 and studied abroad 1883-1886. He was elected member of the Academy of Arts in 1889, appointed professor of architecture at the Royal Institute of Technology in 1889 and became first surveyor in the Chief Surveyor's Office in 1904. He became vice president of the Art Academy in 1902 and president in 1918. He was also elected member of the Royal Academy of Sciences in 1907.

== Work ==
His first major work was the Bünsow building (1886–1888) at Strandvägen in Stockholm, commissioned by the sawmill baron Friedrich Bünsow and influenced by French Renaissance architecture. It broke new ground in its use of natural material throughout (limestone and bricks) rather than the plaster that had been dominant in Swedish architecture until that point. It also broke against conventions through its avoidance of complete symmetry.

During most of the 1880s, Clason ran an architectural firm in Stockholm together with architect Kasper Erik Salin (1856–1919). He designed the house at 14 Österlånggatan (1888-1889) and Adelsvärd House (Adelswärdska huset) at Norrström in Stockholm (1889). They also designed Östermalmshallen (1889), the indoor market at Östermalmstorg in Stockholm.

His largest commission was the Nordic Museum on Djurgården, in North European Renaissance style, which he began in collaboration with architect Magnus Isæus (1841-1890) but continued alone after Isaeus's death in 1890. The building was partly finished for the Stockholm Exhibition in 1897, and completed a few years later.

Other designs include the Hallwyl Palace, also in Stockholm, the Rosen house at Strandvägen, and the building for Ständernas allmänna brandförsäkring, an insurance company, at Skeppsbron in the Old Town of Stockholm. Clason was also responsible for the façade of Norrlands nation in Uppsala.

== Other sources ==
- "Nordisk familjebok" (in Swedish).
- "Nordisk familjebok" (in Swedish).
