= Hans von Hallwyl (1835–1909) =

Swiss politician

- Portrait of Hans von Hallwyl, c. 1870

Personal details
- Born: Hans Theodor Hugo von Hallwyl
- Spouses: Esther von May (m. 1863; div. 1879); Hedwig Styx (m. 1882; died 1905)
- Children: 2

Hans Theodor Hugo von Hallwyl colloquially Hans von Hallwyl (28 December 1835 – 16 June 1909) was a Swiss businessman, land owner and politician who most notably served on the Executive Council of Aargau from 1866 to 1875 (Landammann from 1869–1870). He previously served on the Grand Council of Aargau from 1863 to 1866. During his time of governance, he was involved into the construction of the Seetal Railway.

== Early life and education ==
Von Hallwyl was born 28 December 1835, the second of two sons, to Holland-born Theodor von Hallwyl (1810–1870) and Margaretha Cäcilie von Hallwyl (née von Imhoff; 1815–1893). Both his parents were of nobility hailing from Bernese Patrician families. He had a younger brother, Walther von Hallwyl (1839–1921), who resided in Stockholm, and a younger sister, Mathilde Agnes von Hallwyl (1857–1866).

He was taught privately by Protestant clergyman, including Jacob Kirchner. Von Hallwyl then studied geology at the University of Bern and the University of Berlin. His thesis was written in Latin.

== Personal life ==
In 1861, von Hallwyl married Esther von May (von Rued) (1840–1899), daughter of Friedrich Amadeus Sigmund von May (1801–1883) and Julie von May (von Rued). Through the marriage he became proprietor of the Rued Castle in Schlossrued and the Belletruche winery in Mont-sur-Rolle. The dowry of the wedding was estimated at 500,000 Swiss Francs. They had two daughters;

- Hildegard von Hallwyl (born 1862), married Konrad Alexander von Lerber
- Esther Johanna Irmgard von Hallwyl (1870–1945), married Wolfgang Nicolaus Friedrich von Mülinen (1863–1917), two daughters and one son.

In 1879, he divorced his former wife and remarried in 1882 to Austrian-born Hedwig Styx, the former nanny of his children, with whom he moved to Burgberg Castle in Überlingen on Lake Constance.

Von Hallwyl died at Burgberg Castle aged 73.

== Bibliography ==
- Historische Gesellschaft des Kantons Aargau (ed.s): Biographisches Lexikon des Kantons Aargau 1803–1957. In: Argovia. Band 68/69, Verlag Sauerländer, Aarau 1958, S. 305–306.
