= Ellen Roosval von Hallwyl =

Swedish sculptor (1867–1952)

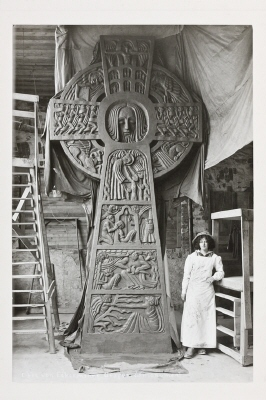
- Born: 1867
- Died: 1952 (aged 84–85)
- Known for: Painting, Sculpture, Musical composition
- Spouses: Henrik de Maré (m. 1887–1906) Johnny Roosval (m. 1907)

Ellen Roosval von Hallwyl (1867–1952), was a Swedish painter, sculptor and composer.

She was the daughter of Count Walther and Countess Wilhelmina von Hallwyl. She was a student of the Wallinska skolan. She married the courtier and diplomat Henrik de Maré in 1887 and was the mother of Rolf de Maré, founder of the Ballets suédois.

After divorcing de Maré in 1906, Ellen married the art historian Johnny Roosval the year after. Roosval was twelve years her junior and her son's tutor, which created a scandal in Sweden.

During the 1920s, she exhibited her sculptures at the Théâtre des Champs-Élysées.

She was given the Litteris et Artibus in 1925.
