= Johnny Roosval =

Swedish art historian, Medieval ecclesiastical art specialist and university professor

Johnny Roosval

John (Johnny) August Emanuel Roosval (29 August 1879 – 18 October 1965) was a Swedish art historian, Medieval ecclesiastical art specialist, and university professor.

== Biography ==
Johnny Roosval was born in a bourgeois family in Kalmar, but grew up in Stockholm from the age of five and went to school there.

=== Education ===
He studied at Uppsala University from 1897, and finished his kandidat degree in philosophy, Latin, French, and Æsthetics with the history of literature and art, and Scandinavian philology in two years.

In 1899 he went to Berlin as a tutor for the son of the Swedish military attaché there, Henrik de Maré. The son, Rolf de Maré, later became known as an art collector and as the owner of the Ballets Suédois. Henrik de Maré's wife, sculptor Ellen von Hallwyl, would later divorce him and married Johnny Roosval in 1907. At the same time, he enrolled at the University of Berlin, where he was a student of Heinrich Wölfflin and Adolph Goldschmidt, two of the founders of art history as an academic discipline. Roosval joined Goldschmidt on bicycle tours of rural churches in the vicinities of Berlin, a method for art historical exploration he would later introduce to his Swedish students. He was awarded his Berlin Dr. phil. degree in 1903 for a dissertation on Flemish altarpieces in Sweden.

=== Work ===
Returning from Berlin to Sweden, he worked at the Nordiska museet in Stockholm and also trained as a reserve officer, later teaching at Uppsala University as a docent of art history, newly established as an independent discipline, having previously counted as part of the study of Æsthetics.

He remained in Uppsala until 1914, when he moved to the Stockholm University. There, he received a titular professorship in 1918, was appointed to the Anders Zorn professorship of Scandinavian and comparative art history in 1920, in accordance with the wishes of the donor, the painter Anders Zorn, but transferred to the J. A. Berg professorship of art history and theory in 1930, becoming an emeritus in 1946.

He also held the Kahn lectures at Princeton University in 1929 and the Charles Eliot Norton lectures at Harvard University 1936–1937. In 1933 he presided over the International Congress of the History of Art held in Stockholm.

=== Medieval ecclesiastical art ===
Roosval is known in particular for his studies of the medieval ecclesiastical art of Gotland, which he described in his Die Kirchen Gotlands: ein Beitrag zur mittelalterlichen Kunstgeschichte Schwedens (Stockholm: Norstedt, 1911) and Die Steinmeister Gottlands (Stockholm: Fritze, 1918).

He also wrote extensively on the Saint George statue in the Stockholm Church of Saint Nicholas (Storkyrkan) and was the first to attribute it to the Lübeck master Bernt Notke. With Sigurd Curman, he co-founded the Sveriges Kyrkor (The Churches of Sweden) documentation project, of which the first volume was published in 1912.

== Personal life ==
Villa Muramaris

In 1917 the architect Arre Essén designed a country home for him, Villa Muramaris, near of Visby on the island of Gotland in Sweden. It was a salon of art, with a sculpture garden. Visiting artists included Post-Impressionist painter Nils von Dardel. The Swedish Cultural Heritage Monument was destroyed by fire in January, 2013.

Johnny Roosval died on 18 October 1965, in Stockholm.
