= Roswell (film) =

1994 film directed by Jeremy Kagan

- Genre: Science fiction
- Based on: UFO Crash at Roswell by: Kevin D. Randle; Donald R. Schmitt
- Screenplay by: Arthur Kopit
- Story by: Paul Davids; Jeremy Kagan; Arthur Kopit
- Directed by: Jeremy Kagan
- Starring: Kyle MacLachlan; Martin Sheen; Dwight Yoakam
- Music by: Elliot Goldenthal
- Country of origin: United States
- Original language: English

Production
- Executive producers: Paul Davids; David R. Ginsburg
- Producers: Jeremy Kagan; Ilene Kahn Power
- Cinematography: Steven Poster
- Editors: David Holden; Bill Yahraus
- Running time: 91 minutes
- Production companies: Viacom Pictures; Citadel Entertainment

Original release
- Network: Showtime
- Release: July 31, 1994

Roswell (also known as Roswell: The U.F.O. Cover-Up) is a 1994 American television film based on a supposedly true story about the Roswell UFO incident, the alleged U.S. military capture of a flying saucer and its alien crew following a crash near the town of Roswell, New Mexico, in July 1947. Along with the Roswell crash, the film references prominent UFOlogy events such as Area 51, alien autopsies, the death of James Forrestal and Majestic-12.

The script was based on the book UFO Crash at Roswell, by Kevin D. Randle and Donald R. Schmitt.

== Plot ==
Beginning at a 30-year reunion for members of the 509th Operations Group, flashbacks are presented that follow the attempts of Major Jesse Marcel to discover the truth about strange debris found on a local rancher's field in July 1947. Told by his superiors that what he has found is nothing more than a downed weather balloon, Marcel maintains his military duty until the weight of the truth, however out of this world it may be, forces him to piece together what really occurred.

== Reception ==
The New York Times reviewed the film as a tense drama, maintaining "an engrossing course". Criticizing the conspiracy aspect, it's noted that "What prevents this professionally fashioned hokum from being a high flier is the annoying question of how a cover-up that involved hundreds or thousands of people could have been maintained for 30 years or even 30 seconds in this expose-prone society."

Variety labeled it "a gripping fictional account". The review concludes: "Wherever the truths of the Roswell incident may lie, director Kagan paces his story convincingly and, in the suspicions it raises about American military mendacity, unflinchingly: superior made-for-TV fare, in other words. The extraterrestrial bodies, by the way, are terrific."

The Los Angeles Times considered the film "no mere sci-fi hardware yarn", adding: "Roswell is not so much a space odyssey but the story of a man's lost soul, that of an Air Force intelligence officer doggedly searching for the truth."

== Cast ==
- Kyle MacLachlan as Jesse A. Marcel
- Martin Sheen as Townsend
- Dwight Yoakam as Mac Brazel
- Xander Berkeley as Sherman Carson
- Bob Gunton as Frank Joyce
- Kim Greist as Vy Marcel
- Peter MacNicol as Lewis Rickett
- John M. Jackson as Colonel Blanchard
- Nick Searcy as Mortician
- J.D. Daniels as Young Jesse Marcel, Jr.
- Charles Hallahan as Older Pilot MacIntire
- Ray McKinnon as Deputy Joe Pritchard
- Eugene Roche as James Forrestal
- Charles Martin Smith as Sheriff Wilcox
- Doug Wert as Older Jesse Marcel, Jr.
- Cynthia Allison as TV commentator
- Hoke Howell as Bar veteran
- Bruce Ed Morrow as General
- Will Huston as Alien clown (as William Edwards)
- Layne Beamer as Soldier
- Max Trumpower as Gate Guard
- Mik Scriba as Air Mechanic
- Matt Landers as Lt. Walter Haut
- George Gray III as Deputy
- Stephen C. Foster as Gate MP
- Dave Adams as Provost Marshal
- Bill Cook as Jeep Driver
- J.W. 'Corkey' Fornof as Pilot
- Charles Beck as Pilot
- Randy Gagne as Pilot
- Charles M. Kistler as Interrogator #1
- Daiton Rutkowski as Interrogator #2
- F. William Parker as Older Stanton
- Jonathan Mincks as Younger Stanton
- Peter Radon as Melvin Brown
- Gary Bullock as Eavesdropper
- Jim Hayne as Harris
- Mark Phelan as Gate Guard
- Steve Lanza as Outside Doctor
- Arthur Kopit as Inside Doctor
- Michael Strasser as Hospital MP
- Don Fischer as Outdoor MP
- Denice Marcel as Waitress
- Brandey Martinez as Waitress #2
- Lisa Waltz as Janet Foss
- John Mahon as Red Hat Vet
- Stanley Grover as Straw Hat Vet
- Warren Munson as Yellow Hat Vet
- Hansford Rowe as Chaplain
- Richard Fancy as Doctor
- Paul Davids as Photographer
- Philip Baker Hall as Roswell General
- Lawrence Dobkin as General (as Larry Dobkin)
- Edward Penn as Civilian Advisor
- Arthur Hiller as Scientist #1
- Parley Baer as Civilian Advisor
- Bruce Gray as Admiral
