= Jesse Marcel =

United States Air Force officer (1907–1986)

Major Jesse Marcel
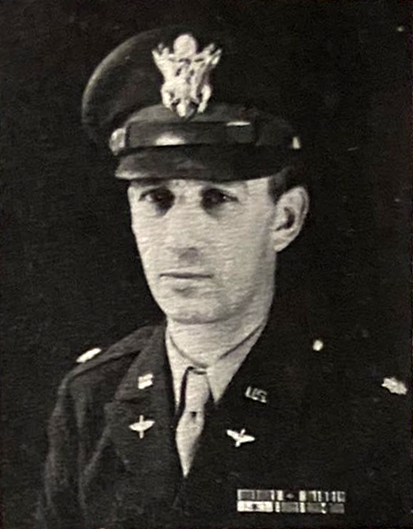
- Marcel in 1947
- Born: May 27, 1907; Bayou Blue, Louisiana, US
- Died: June 23, 1986 (aged 79); Houma, Louisiana, US
- Military career
- Allegiance: United States
- Branch: United States Army Air Forces; United States Air Force
- Service years: 1924–1958
- Rank: Major
- Conflicts: World War II; Korean War
- Awards: Bronze Star; Air Medal (2)

Jesse Antoine Marcel Sr. (May 27, 1907 – June 23, 1986) was a major in the United States Air Force (later a lieutenant colonel in the Reserves) who helped administer Operation Crossroads, the 1946 atom bomb tests at the Bikini Atoll.

Marcel was the first military officer tasked with investigating the 1947 Roswell incident, where supposed "flying disc" debris was later identified as pieces of a weather balloon. The incident was largely forgotten until 1978, when Marcel, then retired from the military, told ufologist Stanton Friedman that he believed the Roswell debris was extraterrestrial.

== Early life and education ==
Jesse Marcel Sr. was born on May 27, 1907, in Bayou Blue, Louisiana. He was the youngest of seven children born to Theodule and Adelaide Marcel. Jesse harbored an early interest in amateur radio and graduated from Terrebonne High School.

According to his memoir, after Marcel graduated from high school, he worked at a general store and attended a few graphic design classes at Louisiana State University (LSU). Marcel began working as a draftsman and cartographer for the Louisiana Highway Department, the Army Corps of Engineers, and the Shell Oil Company. Researcher Robert Todd found that LSU had no record of Marcel's attendance.

== Military career ==
In 1924, Marcel began a three-year enlistment in the Louisiana National Guard, being honorably discharged as a sergeant. In July 1936, he enlisted in the Texas National Guard; he was honorably discharged in June 1939 with the rank of private. He was employed by Shell Oil, making maps from aerial photographs.

=== World War II ===
In January 1942, Marcel applied to be commissioned as an officer, and in April, he was commissioned as a 2nd lieutenant in the US Army Air Forces (USAAF). He attended the Army Air Force Intelligence School in Harrisburg, Pennsylvania, for training as combat photo interpreter/intelligence officer. Upon graduation from the program, Marcel was promoted to the role of instructor. In May 1943, Marcel was briefly mentioned in a Miami fishing column.

In October 1943, 1st Lieutenant Marcel was assigned to the 5th Bomber Command in the Southwest Pacific, serving as squadron intelligence officer and, later, group intelligence officer. He flew in combat missions and received two Air Medals and the Bronze Star. After a promotion to captain, in May 1945, Marcel was promoted to the rank of major.

=== 509th and role in Operation Crossroads ===
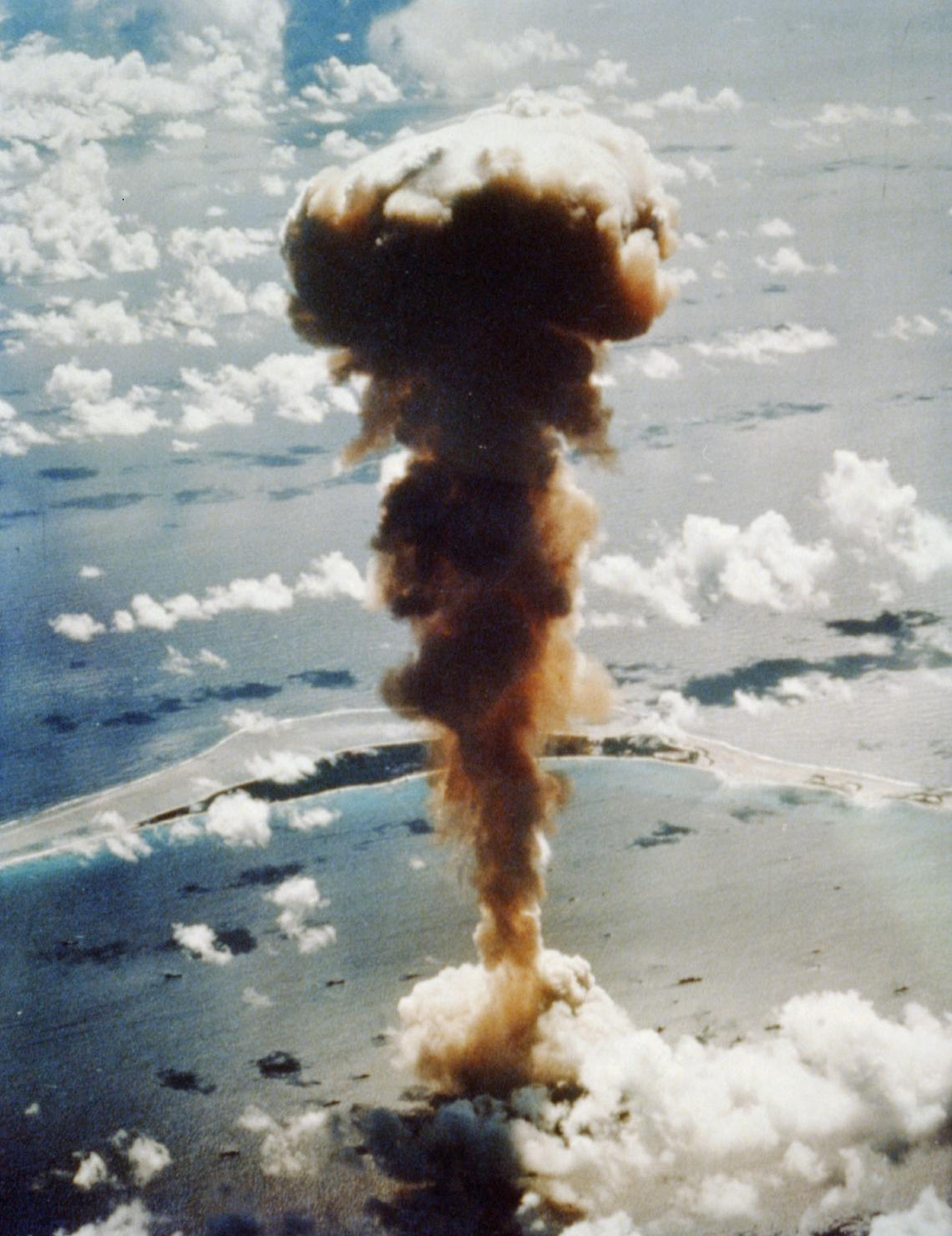
Aerial view of an Operation Crossroads mushroom cloud rising from the lagoon with the Bikini Island visible in the background

Operation Crossroads was a pair of nuclear weapon tests conducted by the United States at Bikini Atoll in mid-1946. They were the first nuclear weapon tests since Trinity in July 1945, and the first detonations of nuclear devices since the atomic bombing of Nagasaki on August 9, 1945. The purpose of the tests was to investigate the effect of nuclear weapons on warships. There were only seven nuclear bombs in existence in July 1946.

The tests, called Able and Baker, both used Fat Man plutonium implosion-type nuclear weapons of the kind dropped on Nagasaki. The Able bomb was stenciled with the name "Gilda" and decorated with an Esquire magazine photograph of Rita Hayworth, star of the 1946 movie, Gilda. The Baker bomb was nicknamed "Helen of Bikini".

In mid-1946, Marcel was attached to the 509th Composite Group to prepare for and participate in Operation Crossroads. On July 26, 1946, Brigadier General Roger M. Ramey authored a letter of commendation complimenting Marcel's performance during Operation Crossroads. The following month, Marcel received an additional letter of commendation from Major General W. E. Kepner for his performance in the operation.

=== Role in the Roswell incident ===
==== Investigation ====
Marcel was the first military officer tasked with investigating a balloon crash near Roswell, New Mexico – an event that occurred amid the flying saucer craze of 1947, and which would subsequently become known as the Roswell incident. On June 26, media nationwide had reported civilian pilot Kenneth Arnold's story of seeing what became known as "flying saucers". Historians would later chronicle over 800 "copycat" sightings reported after the Arnold story.

On Monday, July 7, Roswell Army Air Field was contacted by Sheriff George Wilcox, who reported that a local rancher had recovered a crashed "flying disc". Marcel and Lieutenant Colonel Sheridan Cavitt met with rancher Mac Brazel and followed him back to the ranch outside Corona. With Marcel in a jeep while Brazel and Cavitt rode horses, the trio visited the debris field where they loaded debris into the vehicle.

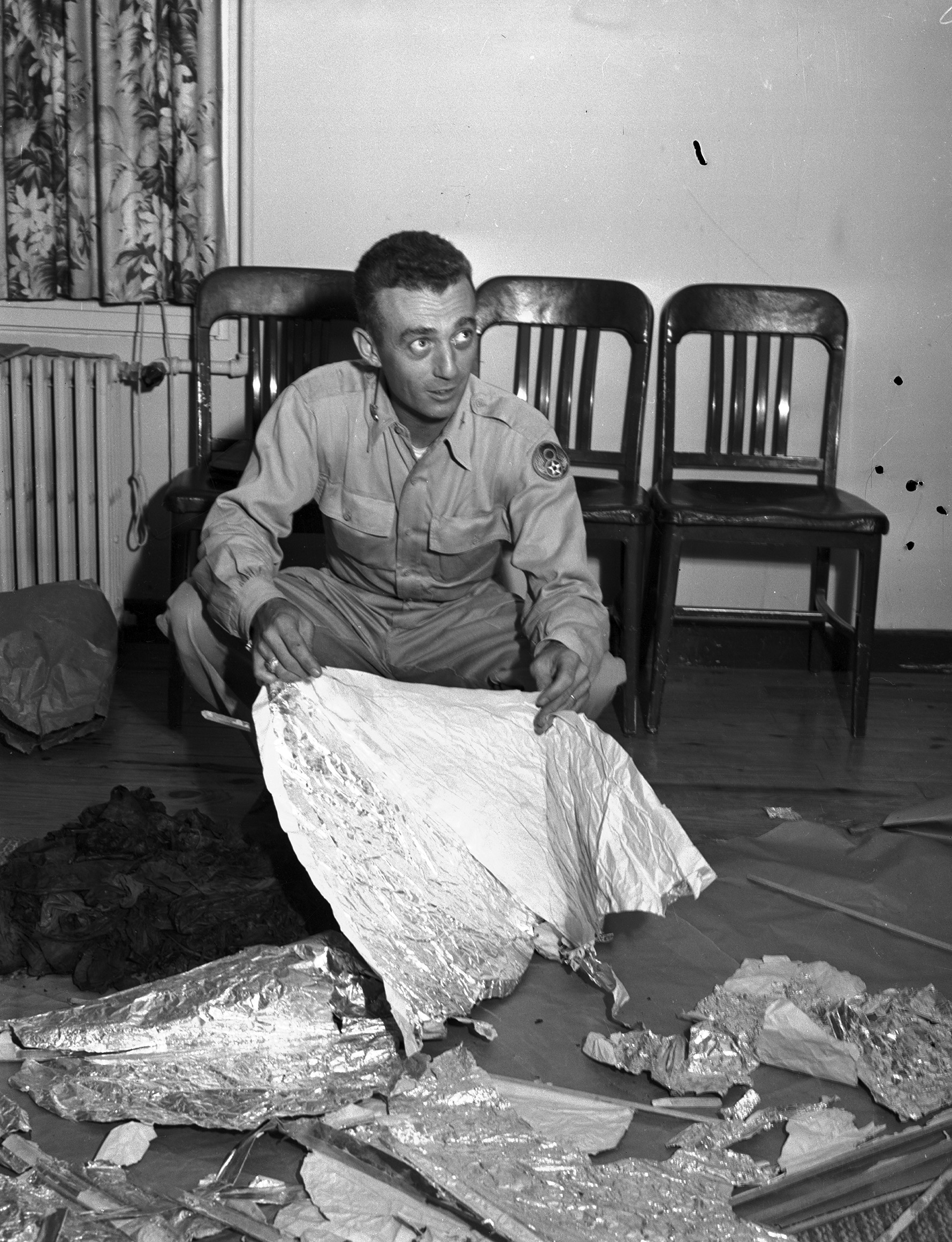
Major Jesse A. Marcel posing with weather balloon debris during the July 8 press conference at Fort Worth Army Air Field

Upon his return to base, Marcel reported the recovery to base commander William H. Blanchard. Roswell Army Air Field issued a press release announcing the recovery of a 'flying disc' and naming Marcel as the responsible officer. The debris was loaded onto a plane, and Marcel accompanied it from Roswell to Fort Worth. After his arrival, Marcel participated in a press conference in Texas where the debris was identified as pieces of a weather balloon kite. Marcel was quoted as saying, "[We] spent a couple of hours Monday afternoon [July 7] looking for any more parts of the weather device, [and] we found a few more patches of tinfoil and rubber."

==== Renewed interest ====
The event at Roswell was largely forgotten until 1978. That year, the sensationalist tabloid National Enquirer reprinted the original, uncorrected article from July 8, 1947. In February 1978, Marcel, then retired from the military, was interviewed by ufologist Stanton Friedman. In that interview, Marcel said he believed the Roswell debris was extraterrestrial.

External videos
- Interviews with Jesse Marcel Sr. and Jr. included in an Unsolved Mysteries episode
- Interview with Jesse Marcel Jr.

On December 8, 1979, Marcel was interviewed by Bob Pratt of the National Enquirer, and on February 28, 1980, the tabloid brought large-scale attention to the Marcel story. On September 20, 1980, the TV series In Search of... aired an interview where Marcel described his participation in the 1947 press conference:

They wanted some comments from me, but I wasn't at liberty to do that. So, all I could do is keep my mouth shut. And General Ramey is the one who discussed – told the newspapers, I mean the newsmen, what it was, and to forget about it. It is nothing more than a weather observation balloon. Of course, we both knew differently.

Marcel's son, Jesse A. Marcel Jr., spent 35 years stating that in 1947, when he was 10 years old, his father had shown him alien debris recovered from the Roswell crash site, including "a small beam with purple-hued hieroglyphics on it". In 1991, retired US Air Force Brigadier General Thomas DuBose, who had posed with debris for press photographs in 1947, acknowledged the "weather balloon explanation for the material was a cover story to divert the attention of the press.

According to a 1994 Air Force report, produced in response to a Congressional inquiry into the Roswell Incident, the material recovered by Marcel was likely debris from Project Mogul – a "then-sensitive, classified project, whose purpose was to determine the state of Soviet nuclear weapons research" using high-altitude balloons. During June and July 1947, Mogul balloons had been test-launched at Alamogordo Army Air Field (now Holloman AFB) and White Sands Missile Range. Air Force declassification officer Lieutenant James McAndrew concluded:

When the civilians and personnel from Roswell AAF ... 'stumbled' upon the highly classified project and collected the debris, no one at Roswell had a 'need to know' about information concerning MOGUL. This fact, along with the initial mis-identification and subsequent rumors that the 'capture' of a 'flying disc' occurred, ultimately left many people with unanswered questions that have endured to this day.

=== Strategic Air Command and later career ===
In December 1947, while still in active duty, Major Marcel received a promotion to the rank of lieutenant colonel in the Air Force Reserve. Marcel requested the promotion in late October and formally signed the oath of office on December 1, 1947. He retained the active duty rank of major. Years later, Marcel said that he did not find out about the Reserve promotion at the time. (Note: Korff writes that "Marcel told receptive Roswell investigators [...] 'They kept me so busy I never even looked at my personnel files'.") Marcel remained with the 509th at Walker AFB until August 16, 1948, when he was transferred to Strategic Air Command at Andrews AFB. When SAC HQ transferred to Offutt AFB in Nebraska on November 9, 1948, Marcel transferred with it.

After requesting a hardship discharge to care for his elderly mother, in July 1950, Marcel returned to Houma, Louisiana. In September 1950, Marcel was released from active duty and transferred to the Air Force reserves. He received his final discharge in 1958.

== Personal life ==
In June 1935, Marcel married Viaud Aleen Abrams. The following year she gave birth to their only child, Jesse A. Marcel Jr.

In his final years, Marcel was a self-employed television repairman. He died on June 23, 1986, in Houma, Louisiana, at the age of 79.

=== Biographical claims ===
Researcher Robert Todd questioned a number of independently unverifiable claims Marcel made in interviews beginning in 1979. At various times, Marcel claimed to have earned a bachelor's degree from George Washington University (GWU); to have attended classes at Louisiana State University (LSU), the University of Wisconsin–Madison (UW–Madison), Ohio State University (OSU), and New York University (NYU); to have written the first US government report about "Joe-1", the first Soviet nuclear test; to have earned two Air Medals by shooting down five enemy planes while serving as a gunner aboard bombers in World War II; and to have received a private pilot's license in 1928 and to have flown thousands of hours.

Todd disputes that Marcel attended UW–Madison, OSU, or NYU due to a lack of evidence that he ever lived near the campuses. Todd contacted both GWU and LSU; neither had records indicating Marcel ever attended classes. US military archives regarding the Joe-1 nuclear test never mention Marcel. According to Marcel's complete military service records, he flew aboard bombers as a combat intelligence officer rather than a gunner, and he received his Air Medals on the basis of combat hours flown rather than enemy aircraft shot down. Although Marcel listed his interests in amateur radio and photography when applying for his USAAF commission in 1942, he never mentioned being a pilot, and subsequent USAAF records explicitly state he had no flying experience. Karl T. Pflock wrote "How likely is it a pilot applying for appointment as an air corps officer would omit the fact that he had been flying for fourteen years?" (Note: Emphasis in original.)
