= Roswell incident =

UFO legend caused by 1947 balloon crash

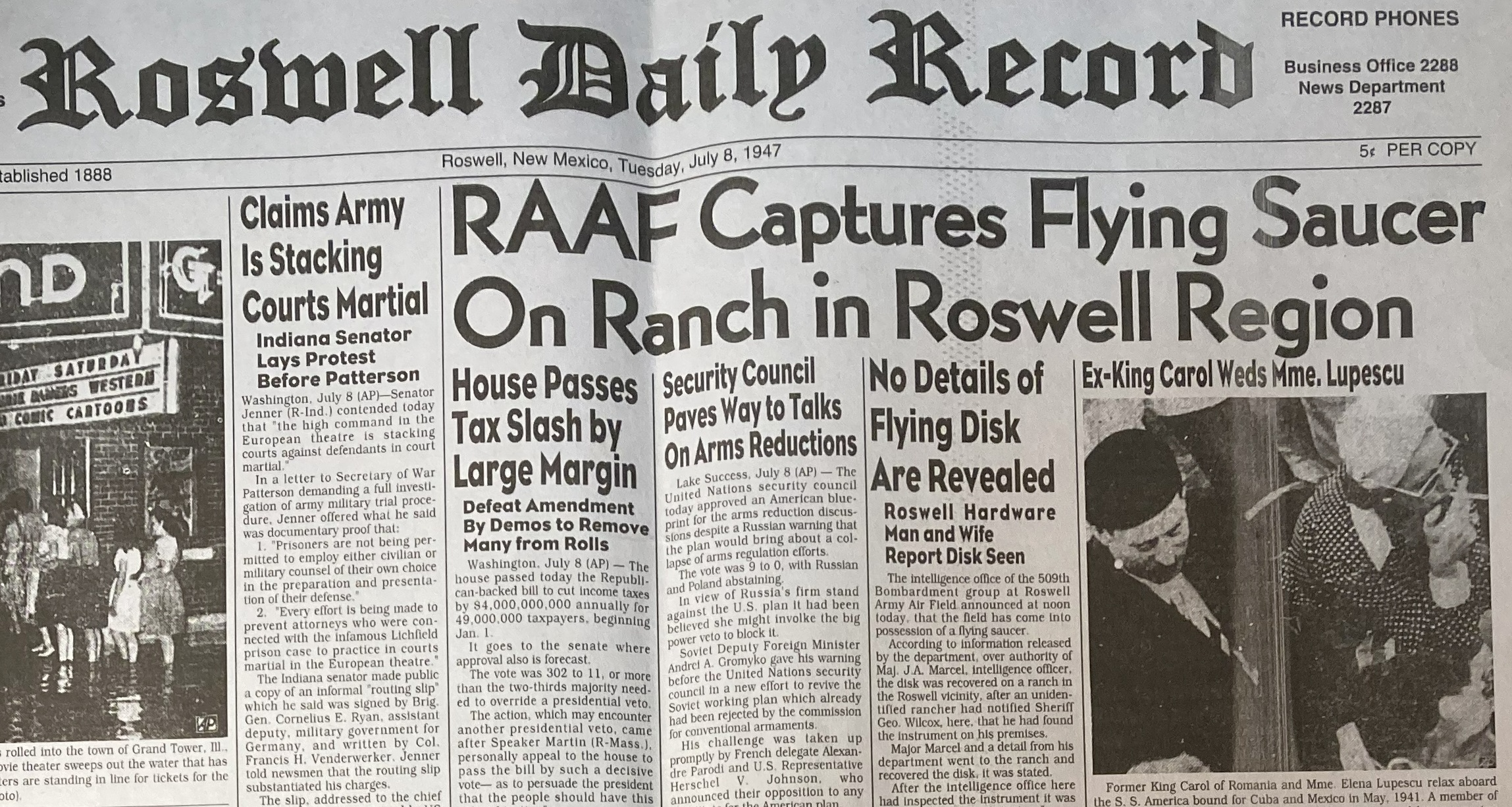
- July 8, 1947, issue of the Roswell Daily Record, featured a story announcing the Roswell Army Air Field "capture" of a "flying saucer" from a ranch near Roswell
- Date: June 4 – July 10, 1947
- Location: Lincoln County, New Mexico, US; 33°57′01″N 105°18′51″W

External audio
- ABC News radio broadcast on Roswell disc – July 8, 1947

Debris found by a rancher in 1947 near Roswell, New Mexico, has become the basis for UFO conspiracy theories alleging that the United States military recovered a crashed extraterrestrial spacecraft. After metallic and rubber debris was recovered by Roswell Army Air Field personnel, the United States Army Air Forces (Note: The United States Army Air Forces became the United States Air Force in September 1947.) announced possession of a "flying disc". This announcement made international headlines, but was retracted within a day. In reality, the debris was from a complex uncrewed military balloon train, consisting of linked balloons and assorted equipment, operated from the nearby Alamogordo Army Air Field as part of the top-secret Project Mogul, a program intended to detect Soviet nuclear tests. (Note: The Roswell material has been attributed to a top secret military balloon project by astrophysicist Adam Frank, historian Lt Col James Michael Young, science writer Kendrick Frazier, folklorist Thomas Bullard, historian Kathryn Olmsted, Project Mogul meteorologist B.D. Gildenberg, journalist Kal Korff, skeptical UFO researcher Philip J. Klass, and intelligence officer Captain James McAndrew among others: Frank 2023, p. 551: "The weather-balloon story was indeed a lie. Instead, what crashed on Brazel's ranch was Project Mogul, a secret experimental program using high-altitude balloons to monitor Russian nuclear tests.; Young 2020, p. 27: "[L]aunch #4 on June 4, 1947, captured the public's attention when a local rancher recovered the balloon debris. Noting unusual metallic objects attached to the debris and suspecting they belonged to the military, the rancher turned the material and objects over to officers at Roswell Army Airfield (RAAF)."; Frazier 2017a: "[...] what we now know the debris to have been: remnants of a long train of research balloons and equipment launched by New York University atmospheric researchers [...]"; Bullard 2016, p. 80: "the Air Force [...] concluded that the wreckage belonged to a Project Mogul balloon array that had disappeared in June 1947."; Olmsted 2009, p. 184: "When one of these balloons smashed into the sands of the New Mexico ranch, the military decided to hide the project's real purpose."; Gildenberg 2003, p. 62: "One such flight, launched in early June, came down on a Roswell area sheep ranch, and created one of the most enduring mysteries of the century."; Korff 1997a, fig. 7: "Unbeknownst to Major Marcel, the debris was actually the remnants of a highly classified military spy device known as Project Mogul."; Klass 1997b, fig. 3: "[...] the debris was from a 600-foot long string of twenty-three weather balloons and three radar targets that had been launched from Alamogordo Army Air Field as part of a 'Top Secret' Project Mogul [...]"; McAndrew 1997, p. 16: "The 1994 Air Force report determined that project Mogul was responsible for the 1947 events. Mogul was an experimental attempt to acoustically detect suspected Soviet nuclear weapon explosions and ballistic missile launches.") To obscure the purpose and source of the debris, the army reported that it was merely a conventional weather balloon.

In 1978, retired United States Air Force officer Jesse Marcel claimed that the Army's weather balloon claim had been a cover story, and speculated that the debris was of extraterrestrial origin. Popularized by the 1980 book The Roswell Incident, this speculation became the basis for long-lasting and increasingly complex and contradictory conspiracy theories, which over time expanded the incident to include governments concealing evidence of extraterrestrial beings, grey aliens, multiple crashed flying saucers, alien corpses and autopsies, and the reverse engineering of extraterrestrial technology, none of which have any factual basis.

In the 1990s, the Air Force published multiple reports which established that the incident was related to Project Mogul, and not debris from a UFO. Despite this and a general lack of evidence, many UFO proponents claim that the Roswell debris was in fact derived from an alien craft, and accuse the US government of a cover-up. The conspiracy narrative has become a trope in science fiction literature, film, and television. The town of Roswell promotes itself as a destination for UFO-associated tourism.

== 1947 military balloon crash ==
Roswell was one of many Army airfields in New Mexico when debris was recovered from a ranch near Corona. Researchers at Alamogordo Air Field, less than 150 miles (240 km) from Roswell, were launching classified balloons during the prior weeks.

By 1947, the United States had launched thousands of top-secret Project Mogul balloons carrying devices to listen for Soviet atomic tests. On June 4, researchers at Alamogordo Army Air Field in New Mexico launched a long train of these balloons; they lost contact with the balloons and balloon-borne equipment within 17 miles (27 km) of the ranch managed by W. W. "Mac" Brazel near Corona, New Mexico, where a balloon array subsequently crashed. Later that month, Brazel discovered tinfoil, rubber, tape, and thin wooden beams scattered across several acres of the ranch.

With no phone or radio, Brazel was initially unaware of the ongoing flying disc craze. Amid the first summer of the Cold War, press nationwide covered Kenneth Arnold's account of what became known as flying saucers, objects that allegedly performed maneuvers beyond the capabilities of any known aircraft. Coverage of Arnold's report preceded a wave of over 800 similar sightings. When Brazel visited Corona, on July 5, his uncle Hollis Wilson suggested his debris could be from a "flying disk". Hundreds of reports had been made during the Fourth of July weekend, newspapers speculated on a possible Soviet origin, and about $3,000 (equivalent to $43,000 in 2025) was offered for physical proof.

The next day Brazel drove to Roswell, New Mexico, and informed Sheriff George Wilcox of the debris he had found. Wilcox called Roswell Army Air Field (RAAF). RAAF was home to the 509th Bomb Group of the Eighth Air Force, the only unit at the time capable of delivering nuclear weapons. The base assigned Major Jesse Marcel and Captain Sheridan Cavitt to return with Brazel and gather the material from the ranch. RAAF Base commander Colonel William Blanchard notified the Eighth Air Force commanding officer Roger M. Ramey of their findings.

On July 8, RAAF public information officer Walter Haut issued a press release stating that the military had recovered a "flying disc" near Roswell. Robert Porter, an RAAF flight engineer, was part of the crew who loaded what he was "told was a flying saucer" onto the flight bound for Fort Worth Army Air Field in Texas. He described the material – packaged in wrapping paper when he received it – as lightweight and not too large to fit inside the trunk of a car. After station director George Walsh broke the news over Roswell radio station KSWS and relayed it to the Associated Press, his phone lines were overwhelmed. He later recalled, "All afternoon, I tried to call Sheriff Wilcox for more information, but could never get through to him [...] Media people called me from all over the world."

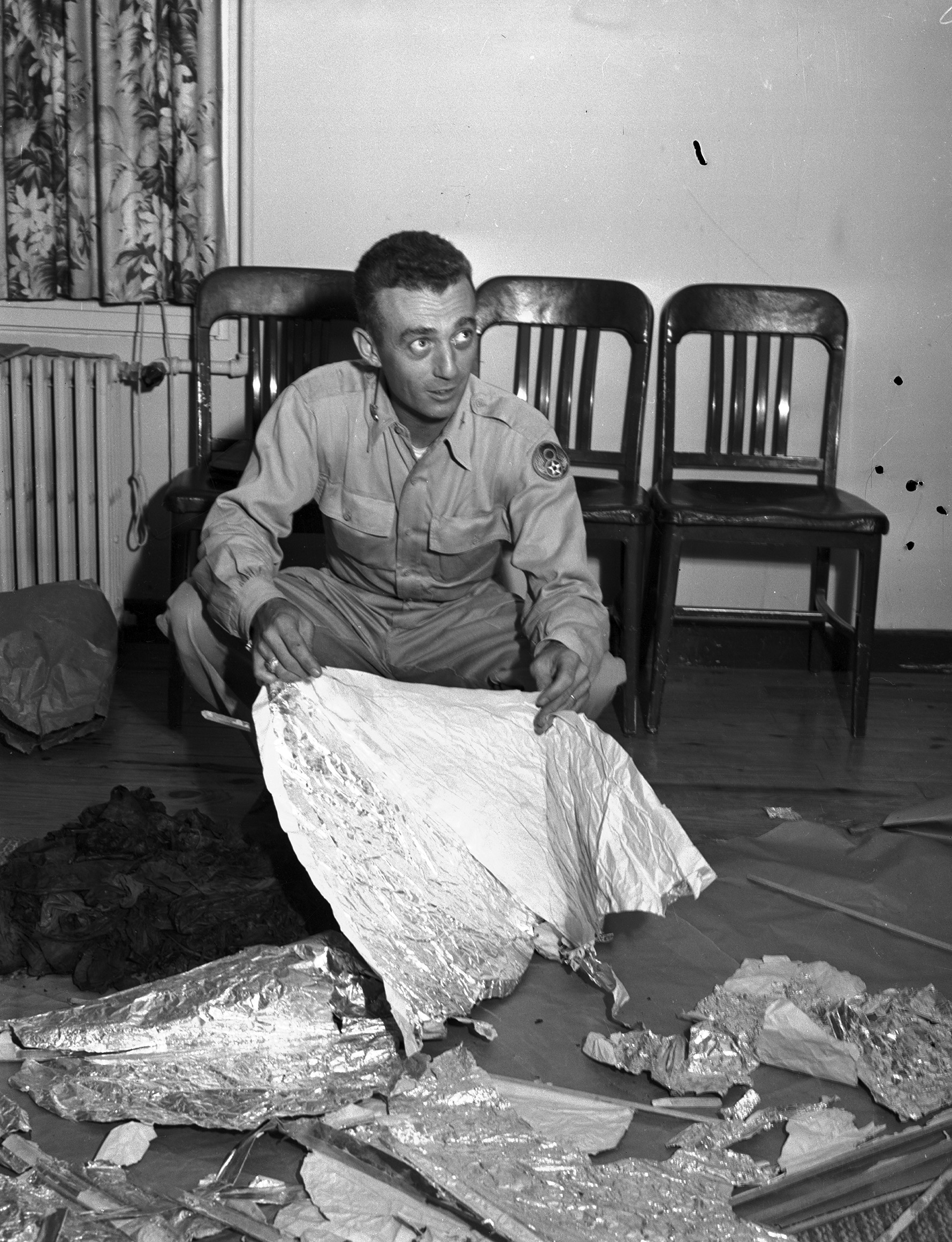
Papers nationwide published an image from Fort Worth Army Air Field of Major Jesse A. Marcel posing with debris on July 8, 1947.

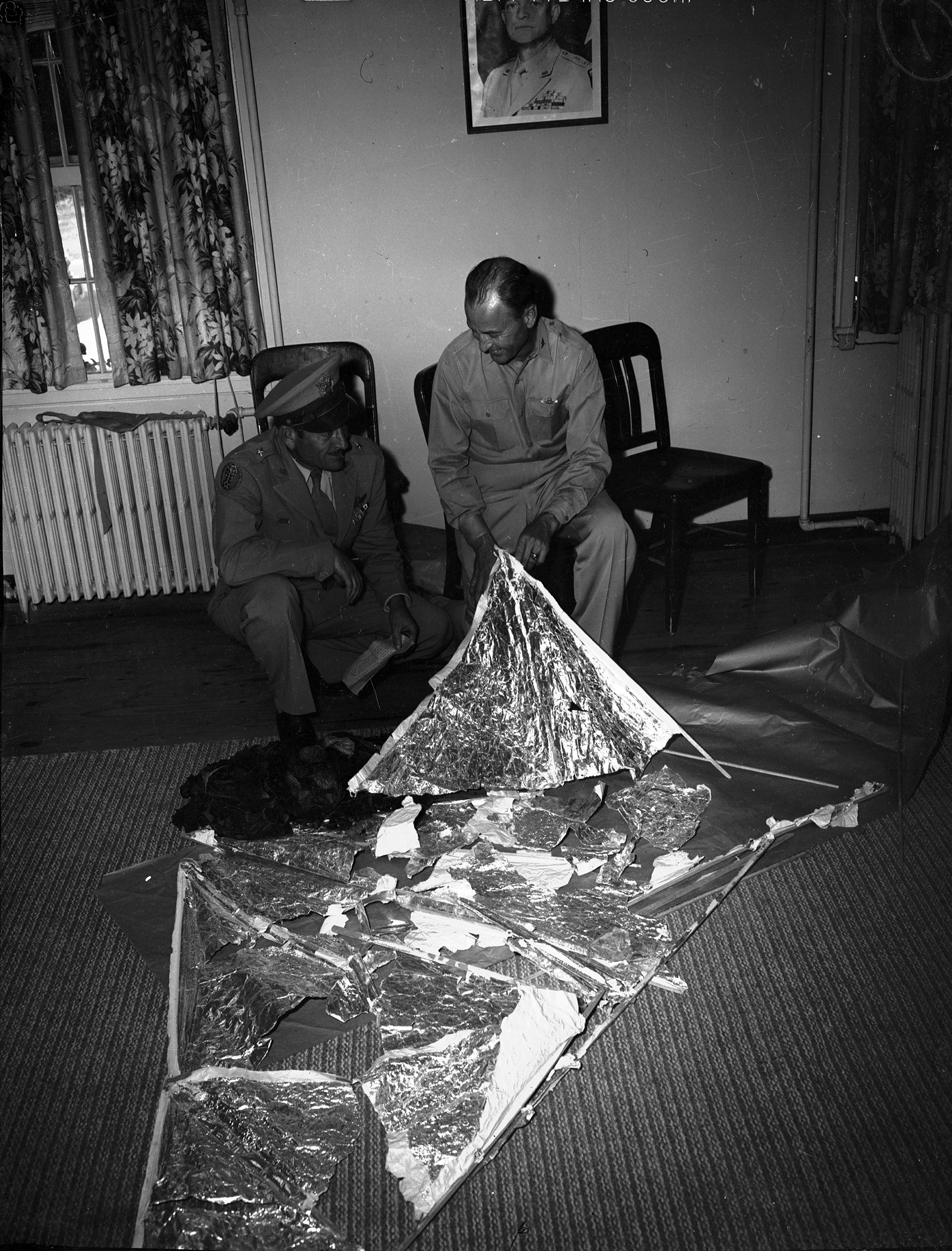
Brig. General Roger Ramey (left) and Col. Thomas J. DuBose pose with debris.

The press release issued by Haut read:

The many rumors regarding the flying disc became a reality yesterday when the intelligence office of the 509th Bomb group of the Eighth Air Force, Roswell Army Air Field, was fortunate enough to gain possession of a disc through the cooperation of one of the local ranchers and the sheriff's office of Chaves County.

The flying object landed on a ranch near Roswell sometime last week. Not having phone facilities, the rancher stored the disc until such time as he was able to contact the sheriff's office, who in turn notified Maj. Jesse A. Marcel of the 509th Bomb Group Intelligence Office.

— Associated Press (July 8, 1947)

Media interest in the case dissipated soon after a press conference where General Roger Ramey, his chief of staff Colonel Thomas DuBose, and weather officer Irving Newton identified the material as pieces of a weather balloon. Newton told reporters that similar radar targets were used at about 80 weather stations across the country. The small number of subsequent news stories offered mundane and prosaic accounts of the crash. On July 9, the Roswell Daily Record highlighted that no engine or metal parts had been found in the wreckage. Brazel told the Record that the debris consisted of rubber strips, "tinfoil, paper, tape, and sticks." Brazel said he paid little attention to it but returned later with his wife and daughter to gather up some of the debris. Despite later claims that he was forced to repeat a cover story, Brazel told newspaper reporters, "I am sure that what I found was not any weather observation balloon." When interviewed in Fort Worth, Texas, Jesse Marcel described the wreckage as "parts of the weather device" composed of "tinfoil and broken wooden beams".

A portion of the material was flown from Texas to Wright Field in Ohio, where Colonel Marcellus Duffy identified it as balloon equipment. Duffy had previous experience with Project Mogul and contacted Mogul's project officer Albert Trakowski to discuss the debris. Unable to disclose details about the project, Duffy identified it as "meteorological equipment".

The 1947 official account omitted any connection to Cold War military programs. On July 10, military personnel at Alamogordo gave a demonstration to the press. Four officers provided a false account of mundane weather balloon usage throughout the previous year. They demonstrated balloon configurations used by the Mogul team as ways to gather meteorological data, offering a plausible explanation for any unusual aspects of the Roswell debris. The United States Air Force later described the weather balloon story as "an attempt to deflect attention from the top secret Mogul project."

== UFO conspiracy theories (1947–1978) ==
The 1947 debris retrieval remained relatively obscure for three decades. Reporting ceased soon after the government provided a mundane explanation, and broader reporting on flying saucers declined rapidly after the Twin Falls saucer hoax. Just days after stories of the Roswell "flying disc", a widely reported crashed disc from Twin Falls, Idaho, was found to be a hoax created by four teenagers using parts from a jukebox.

Nevertheless, belief in UFO cover-ups by the US government became widespread in this period. Hoaxes, legends, and stories of crashed spaceships and alien bodies in New Mexico emerged that later formed elements of the Roswell myth. In 1947, many Americans attributed flying saucers to unknown military aircraft. In the decades between the initial debris recovery and the emergence of Roswell theories, flying saucers became synonymous with alien spacecraft. After the assassination of John F. Kennedy and the Watergate scandal, trust in the US government declined and acceptance of conspiracy theories became widespread. UFO believers accused the government of a "Cosmic Watergate". The 1947 incident was reinterpreted to fit the public's increasingly conspiracy-minded outlook.

=== Aztec crashed saucer hoax ===
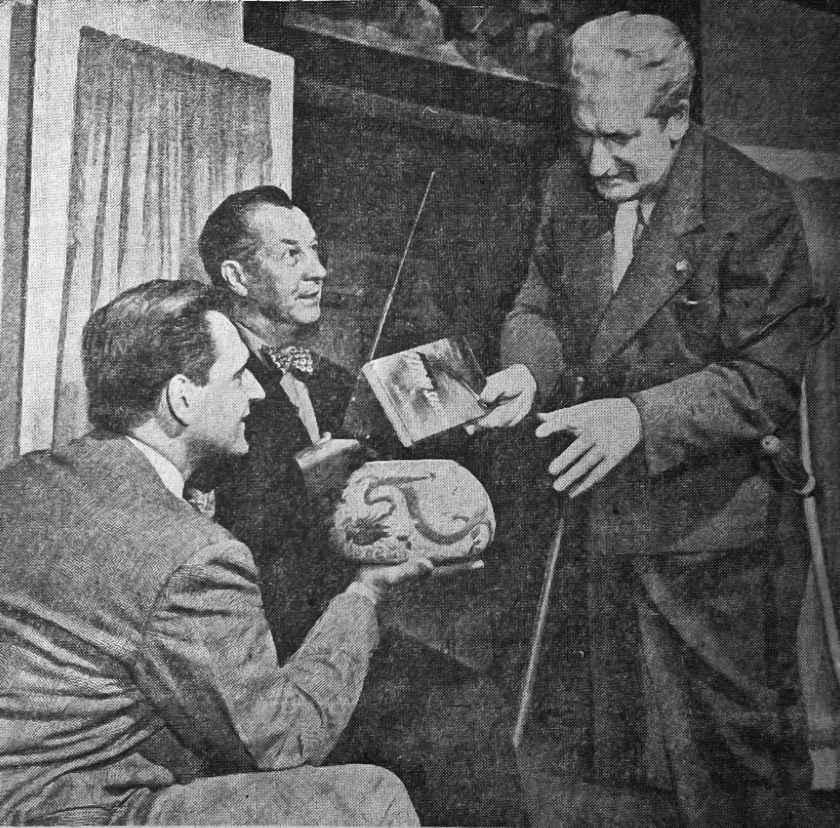
Author Frank Scully (right) and confidence man Silas Newton (center)

The Aztec, New Mexico, crashed saucer hoax in 1948 introduced stories of recovered alien bodies that later became associated with Roswell. It achieved broad exposure when the con artists behind it convinced Variety columnist Frank Scully to cover their fictitious crash. The hoax narrative included small grey humanoid bodies, metal stronger than any found on Earth, indecipherable writing, and a government coverup to prevent public panic – these elements appeared in later versions of the Roswell myth. In retellings, the mundane debris reported at the actual crash site was replaced with the Aztec hoax's fantastical alloys. By the time Roswell returned to media attention, grey aliens had become a part of American culture through the Barney and Betty Hill incident. In a 1997 Roswell report, Air Force investigator James McAndrew wrote that "even with the exposure of this obvious fraud, the Aztec story is still revered by UFO theorists. Elements of this story occasionally reemerge and are thought to be the catalyst for other crashed flying saucer stories, including the Roswell Incident."

=== Hangar 18 ===
"Hangar 18" is a non-existent location that many later conspiracy theories allege housed extraterrestrial craft or bodies recovered from Roswell. The idea of alien corpses from a crashed ship being stored in an Air Force morgue at the Wright-Patterson Air Force Base was mentioned in Scully's Behind the Flying Saucers, expanded in the 1966 book Incident at Exeter, and became the basis for a 1968 science-fiction novel The Fortec Conspiracy. Fortec was about a fictional cover-up by the Air Force unit charged with reverse-engineering other nations' technical advancements.

In 1974, science-fiction author and conspiracy theorist Robert Spencer Carr alleged that alien bodies recovered from the Aztec crash were stored in "Hangar 18" at Wright-Patterson. Carr claimed that his sources had witnessed the alien autopsy, another idea later incorporated into the Roswell narrative. The Air Force explained that no "Hangar 18" existed at the base, noting a similarity between Carr's story and the fictional Fortec Conspiracy. The 1980 film Hangar 18, which dramatized Carr's claims, was described as "a modern-day dramatization" of Roswell by the film's director James L. Conway, and as "nascent Roswell mythology" by folklorist Thomas Bullard. Decades later, Carr's son recalled that he had often "mortified my mother and me by spinning preposterous stories in front of strangers... [tales of] befriending a giant alligator in the Florida swamps, and sharing complex philosophical ideas with porpoises in the Gulf of Mexico."

== Roswell conspiracy theories (1978–1994) ==
External videos
- Interviews with Jesse Marcel Sr. and Jr. included in an Unsolved Mysteries episode
- Interview with Jesse Marcel Jr.

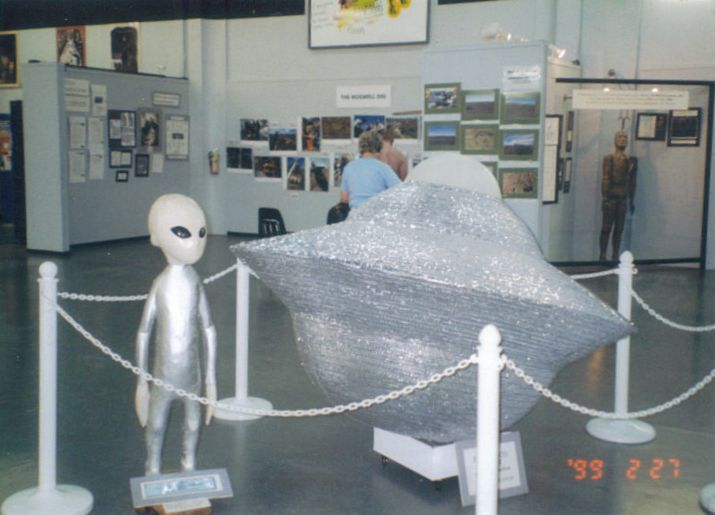
Roswell International UFO Museum

Interest in Roswell was rekindled after ufologist Stanton Friedman interviewed Jesse Marcel in 1978. Marcel had accompanied the Roswell debris from the ranch to the Fort Worth press conference. In the 1978 interview, Marcel stated that the "weather balloon" explanation from the press conference was a cover story, and that he now believed the debris was extraterrestrial. On December 19, 1979, Marcel was interviewed by Bob Pratt of the National Enquirer, and the tabloid brought large-scale attention to the Marcel story the following February. Marcel described a foil that could be crumpled but would uncrumple when released. On September 20, 1980, the TV series In Search of..., hosted by Star Trek actor Leonard Nimoy, aired an interview where Marcel described his participation in the 1947 press conference:

They wanted some comments from me, but I wasn't at liberty to do that. So, all I could do is keep my mouth shut. And General Ramey is the one who discussed – told the newspapers, I mean the newsman, what it was, and to forget about it. It is nothing more than a weather observation balloon. Of course, we both knew differently.

Ufologists interviewed Major Marcel's son, Jesse A. Marcel Jr. M.D., who said that when he was 10 years old, his father had shown him flying saucer debris recovered from the Roswell crash site, including, "a small beam with purple-hued hieroglyphics on it". However, the symbols described as alien hieroglyphics matched the symbols on the adhesive tape that Project Mogul sourced from a New York toy manufacturer.

To publish his research, Friedman collaborated with childhood friend and author William "Bill" Moore, who reached out to established paranormal author Charles Berlitz. Berlitz had previously written about the Bermuda Triangle and had collaborated with Moore to write about the Philadelphia Experiment. Crediting Friedman only as an investigator, Moore and Berlitz co-wrote the 1980 book The Roswell Incident. It popularized Marcel's account and added the claimed discovery of alien bodies, found approximately 150 miles west of the original debris site on the Plains of San Agustin. Marcel never mentioned the presence of bodies.

Friedman, Berlitz, and Moore also connected Marcel's account to an earlier statement by Lydia Sleppy, a former teletype operator at the KOAT radio station in Albuquerque, New Mexico. Sleppy claimed that she was typing a story about crashed saucer wreckage as dictated by reporter Johnny McBoyle until interrupted by an incoming message, ordering her to end communications. Between 1978 and the early 1990s, UFO researchers such as Friedman, Moore, and the team of Kevin D. Randle and Donald R. Schmitt interviewed many people who claimed to have had a connection with the events at Roswell in 1947, generating competing and conflicting accounts.

=== The Roswell Incident ===
In 1947, officers from Roswell Army Air Field investigated a debris field near Corona. By the 1980s, popular accounts conflated the debris investigation with two separate myths of humanoid bodies over 300 miles away from Roswell.

The first Roswell conspiracy book, released in October 1980, was The Roswell Incident by Charles Berlitz and Bill Moore. Anthropologist Charles Ziegler described the 1980 book as "version 1" of the Roswell myth. Berlitz and Moore's narrative was the dominant version of the Roswell conspiracy during the 1980s.

The book argues that an extraterrestrial craft was flying over the New Mexico desert to observe nuclear weapons activity when a lightning strike killed the alien crew. It alleges that, after recovering the crashed alien technology, the US government engaged in a cover-up to prevent mass panic. The Roswell Incident quoted Marcel's later description of the debris as "nothing made on this earth". The book claims that in some photographs, the debris recovered by Marcel had been substituted with the debris from a weather device despite no visible differences in the photographed material. The book's claims of unusual debris were contradicted by the mundane details provided by Captain Sheridan Cavitt, who had gathered the material with Marcel. The Roswell Incident introduced alien bodies – via the second-hand legends of deceased civil engineer Grady "Barney" Barnett – purportedly found by archaeologists on the Plains of San Agustin.

The authors claimed to have interviewed over 90 witnesses, though the testimony of only 25 appears in the book. Only seven of them claimed to have seen the debris. Of these, five claimed to have handled it. Some elements of the witness accounts – small alien bodies, indestructible metals, hieroglyphic writing – matched other crashed saucer legends more than the 1947 reports from Roswell. Berlitz and Moore claimed Scully's long-discredited crashed saucer hoax to be an account of the Roswell incident that mistakenly "placed the area of the crash near Aztec".

Mac Brazel died in 1963 before interest in the Roswell debris was revived. Berlitz and Moore interviewed his surviving adult children, William Brazel Jr. and Bessie Brazel Schreiber. Brazel Jr. described how the military arrested his father and "swore him to secrecy". However, during the time that Mac Brazel was alleged to have been in military custody, multiple people reported seeing him in Roswell, and he provided an interview to local radio station KGFL. Schreiber, who had gathered debris material with her father when she was 14, offered ufologists a description that matched the materials used by Project Mogul, "There was what appeared to be pieces of heavily waxed paper and a sort of aluminum-like foil. [...] Some of the metal-foil pieces had a sort of tape stuck to them, and when they were held up to the light they showed what looked like pastel flowers [...]".

According to the book, "some of the most important testimony" was given by Marcel, the former intelligence officer who had gathered the debris in 1947 and claimed to have been part of a cover-up. The broader UFO media treated Marcel as a whistleblower. Independent researchers found embellishment in Jesse Marcel's accounts, including false statements about his military career and educational background.

=== Majestic 12 hoax ===
External videos
- Bill Moore addresses MUFON, July 1 1989

Majestic 12 was the purported organization behind faked government documents delivered anonymously to multiple ufologists in the 1980s. (Note: The MJ-12 organization is given several similar names. The Shandera document called it "Majestic-12 (Majic-12)". Pratt and Moore used "Majik 12" while working on their novel. The earliest Bennewitz memo called it "MJ Twelve". Milton William Cooper called it "Majesty Twelve".) All individuals who received the fake documents were connected to Bill Moore. After the publication of The Roswell Incident, Richard C. Doty and other individuals presenting themselves as Air Force Intelligence Officers approached Moore. They used the unfulfilled promise of hard evidence of extraterrestrial retrievals to recruit Moore, who kept notes on other ufologists and intentionally spread misinformation within the UFO community. The earliest known reference to "MJ Twelve" comes from a 1981 document used in disinformation targeting Paul Bennewitz. In 1982, Bob Pratt worked with Doty and Moore on The Aquarius Project, an unpublished science fiction manuscript about the purported organization. Moore had initially planned to do a nonfiction book but lacked evidence. During a phone call about the manuscript, Moore explained to Pratt that his goal was to "get as much of the story out with as little fiction as possible." That same year, Moore, Friedman, and Jaime Shandera began work on a KPIX-TV UFO documentary, and Moore shared the original "MJ Twelve" memo mentioning Bennewitz. KPIX-TV contacted the Air Force, which noted many style and formatting errors; Moore admitted that he had typed and stamped the document as a facsimile. On December 11, 1984, Shandera received the first anonymous package containing photographs of Majestic-12 documents just after a phone call from Moore. The anonymously delivered documents detailed the creation of a likely fictitious Majestic 12 group formed to handle Roswell debris.

At a 1989 Mutual UFO Network conference, Moore confessed that he had intentionally fed fake evidence of extraterrestrials to UFO researchers, including Bennewitz. Doty later said that he gave fabricated information to UFO researchers while working at Kirtland Air Force Base in the 1980s. Roswell conspiracy proponents turned on Moore, but not the broader conspiracy theory.

The Majestic-12 materials have been heavily scrutinized and discredited. The various purported memos existed only as copies of photographs of documents. Carl Sagan criticized the complete lack of provenance of documents "miraculously dropped on a doorstep like something out of a fairy story, perhaps 'The Elves and the Shoemaker'." Researchers noted that the idiosyncratic date format was not found in government documents from the time they were purported to originate, but was widely used in Moore's personal notes. Some signatures appear to be photocopied from other documents. For example, a signature from President Harry Truman is identical to one from an October 1, 1947 letter to Vannevar Bush.

In this variant of the Roswell legend, the bodies were ejected from the craft shortly before it exploded over the ranch. The propulsion unit is destroyed, and the government concludes the ship was a "short-range reconnaissance craft". The following week, the bodies are recovered some miles away, decomposing from exposure and scavengers.

=== Role of Glenn Dennis ===
External videos
- Unsolved Mysteries segment September 20, 1989
- Glenn Dennis's story as dramatized by Unsolved Mysteries September 18, 1994

The initial claims of recovered alien bodies came from the secondhand accounts of "Barney" Barnett and "Pappy" Henderson after their deaths. On August 5, 1989, Friedman interviewed former mortician Glenn Dennis. Dennis provided an account of extraterrestrial corpses endorsed by prominent Roswell ufologists Don Berliner, Friedman, Randle, and Schmitt. Dennis claimed to have received "four or five calls" from the Air Base with questions about body preservation and inquiries about small or hermetically sealed caskets; he further claimed that a local nurse told him she had witnessed an "alien autopsy". Glenn Dennis has been called the "star witness" of the Roswell incident.

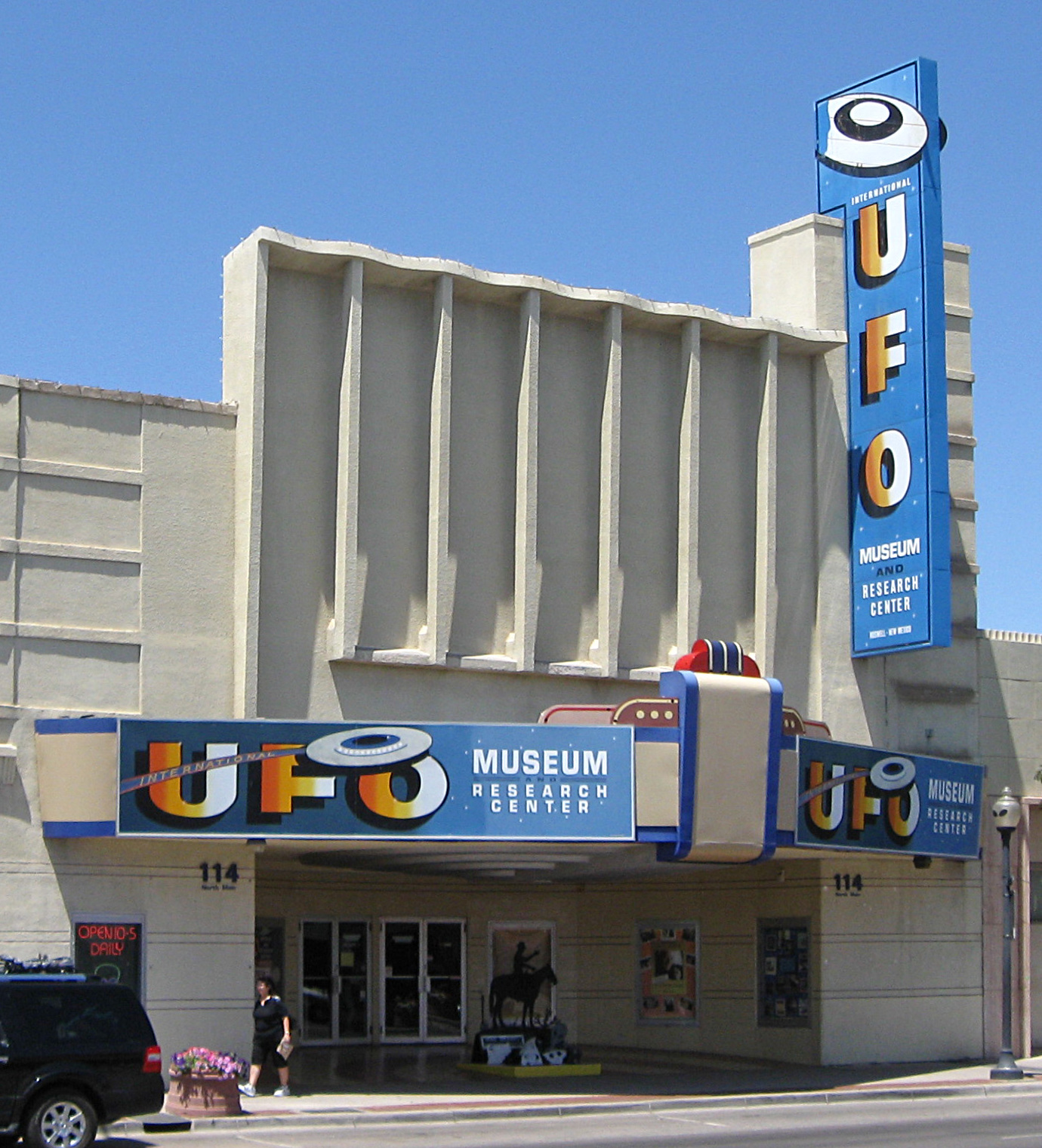
In 1991, Glenn Dennis and Walter Haut opened a UFO museum in Roswell.

On September 20, 1989, an episode of Unsolved Mysteries included the second-hand stories of alien bodies captured by the army and transported to Texas. The episode was watched by 28 million people. In 1994, Dennis's account was portrayed by Unsolved Mysteries and dramatized in the made-for-TV movie Roswell. Dennis appeared in multiple books and documentaries. In 1991, Dennis co-founded a UFO museum in Roswell along with Max Littell and former RAAF public affairs officer Walter Haut.

Dennis provided false names for the nurse who allegedly witnessed the autopsy. Presented with evidence that a Naomi Self or Naomi Maria Selff had never worked as a military nurse in 1947, Dennis admitted to fabricating her name. He claimed the nurse's actual name was Naomi Sipes. When no records were found for a Naomi Sipes, Dennis admitted to fabricating that name as well. UFO researcher Karl Pflock observed that Dennis's story "sounds like a B-grade thriller conceived by Oliver Stone." Scientific skeptic author Brian Dunning said that Dennis cannot be regarded as a reliable witness, considering that he had seemingly waited over 40 years before he started recounting a series of unconnected events. Such events, Dunning argues, were then arbitrarily joined to form what has become the most popular narrative of the alleged alien crash. Prominent UFO researchers, including Pflock and Randle, have become convinced that no bodies were recovered from the Roswell crash.

=== Competing accounts and schism ===
Historian Curtis Peebles writes that "some 300 witnesses came forward to claim they had seen or heard something about the recovery. Yet, despite all the added 'information', what really happened at Roswell became less clear." A proliferation of competing Roswell accounts led to a schism among ufologists in the early 1990s. The two leading UFO societies disagreed on the scenarios presented by Randle–Schmitt and Friedman–Berliner. One issue was the location of Barnett's account. A 1992 UFO conference attempted to achieve a consensus among the various scenarios portrayed in Crash at Corona and UFO Crash at Roswell. The 1994 publication of The Truth About the UFO Crash at Roswell addressed the Barnett problem by simply ignoring the Barnett story. It proposed a new location for the alien craft recovery and a different group of archaeologists.

==== UFO Crash at Roswell ====
Still from the 1994 film Roswell: The UFO Cover Up, based on the 1991 book. After filming, the prop became part of a permanent exhibit at a Roswell tourist attraction.

In 1991, Kevin Randle and Donald Schmitt published UFO Crash at Roswell. It sold 160,000 copies and served as the basis for the 1994 television film Roswell. Randle and Schmitt added testimony from 100 new witnesses. Though hundreds of people were interviewed by various researchers, only a few claimed to have seen debris or aliens. According to Pflock, of the 300-plus individuals reportedly interviewed for UFO Crash at Roswell (1991), only 23 could be "reasonably thought to have seen physical evidence, debris". Of these, only seven asserted anything suggestive of otherworldly origins for the debris.

External videos
- Thomas DuBose interview in Recollections of Roswell (1992)

The book claimed that General Arthur Exon had been aware of debris and bodies, but Exon disputed his depiction. Glenn Dennis's claims of an alien autopsy and Grady Barnett's "alien body" accounts appeared in the book. However, the dates and locations of Barnett's account in The Roswell Incident were changed without explanation. Brazel was described as leading the army to a second crash site on the ranch, where they were supposedly "horrified to find civilians [including Barnett] there already." Also in 1991, retired US Air Force (USAF) Brigadier General Thomas DuBose, who had posed with debris for press photographs in 1947, acknowledged the "weather balloon explanation for the material was a cover story to divert the attention of the press."

==== Crash at Corona ====
In 1992, Stanton Friedman released Crash at Corona, co-authored with Don Berliner. The book introduced new witnesses and added to the narrative by increasing the number of flying saucers to two, and the number of aliens to eight – two of which were said to have survived and been taken into custody by the government. Friedman interviewed Lydia Sleppy, the teletype operator who years earlier had said that she was ordered not to transmit a crashed saucer story. Friedman attributed Sleppy's account to FBI usage of an alleged nationwide surveillance system that he believed was put in place following "an earlier crash". However, no evidence was found that the FBI had ever monitored any transmissions from her radio station. Friedman's description of her typing as "interrupted" by an FBI message and Moore's claim that "the machine suddenly stopped itself" were found to be impossible for the teletype model that Sleppy operated in 1947.

==== The Truth About the UFO Crash at Roswell ====
In 1994, Randle and Schmitt authored another book, The Truth About the UFO Crash at Roswell which claimed a cargo plane delivered alien bodies to Dwight D. Eisenhower. The book abandoned the Barnett crash site on the Plains of San Agustin as lacking evidence and contradicting its "framework of the Roswell event". Randle and Schmitt proposed a new crash site 35 miles north of Roswell, based on statements from Jim Ragsdale and Frank Kaufman. The book hid Kaufman's identity behind the pseudonym "Steve MacKenzie", but Kaufman appeared in the 1995 British television documentary The Roswell Incident using his real name. Kaufman claimed he monitored a UFO's path on radar and recovered debris from a crashed spaceship similar in shape to an F-117 stealth fighter. Kaufmann's statements did not match the personnel at the base, his service record, the radar technology available, or the known topography of the proposed crashed site. Jim Ragsdale claimed that while driving home along Highway 285 with his girlfriend Trudy Truelove, they watched a craft that was "narrow with a bat-like wing" crash. A later interview with Ragsdale clarified that his alleged crash site was nowhere near either the purported Barnett or Kaufman sites. In further interviews, Ragsdale's story grew to include bizarre details such as Ragsdale and Truelove removing eleven golden helmets from the alien craft to bury in the desert.

== Air Force response ==
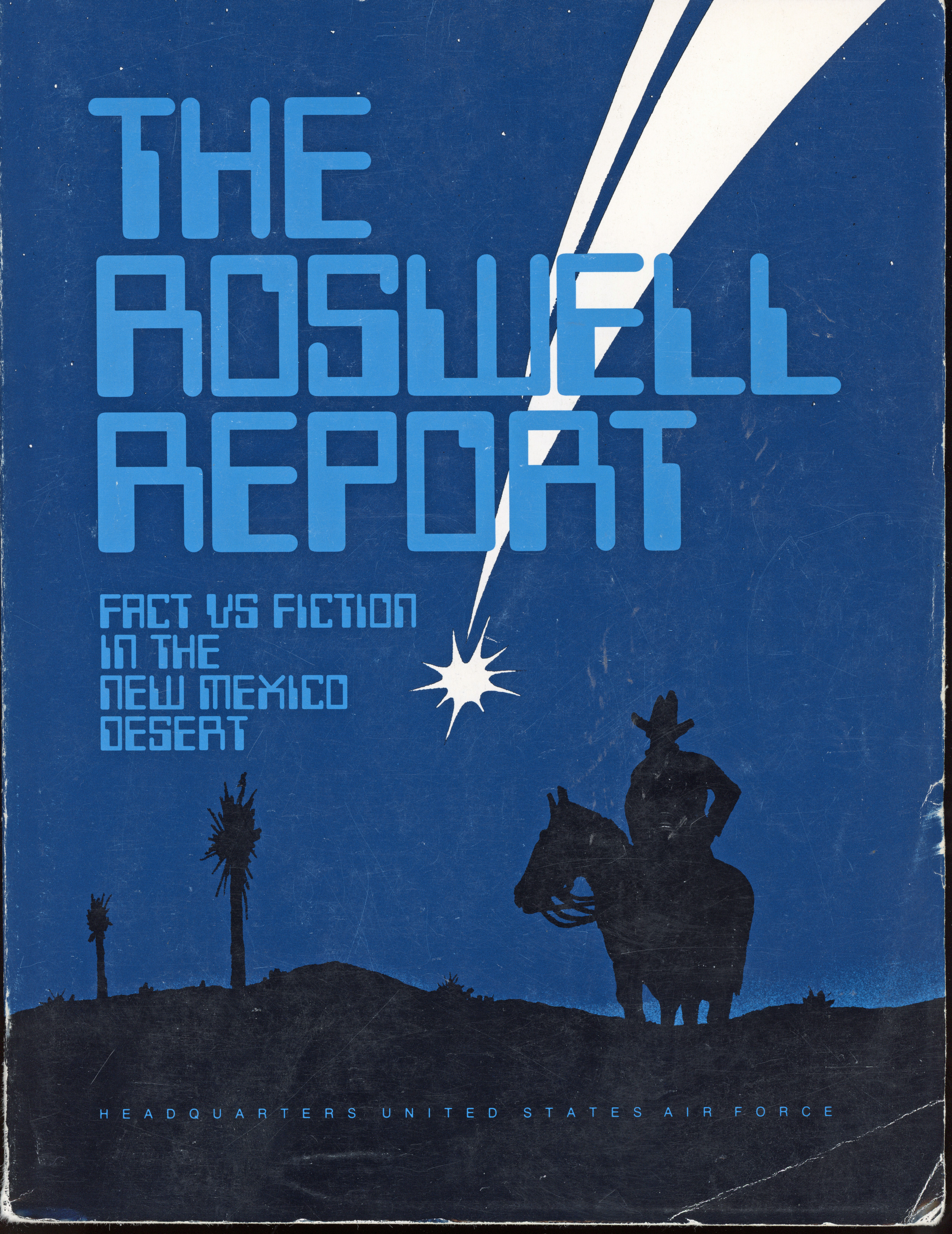
(1995)

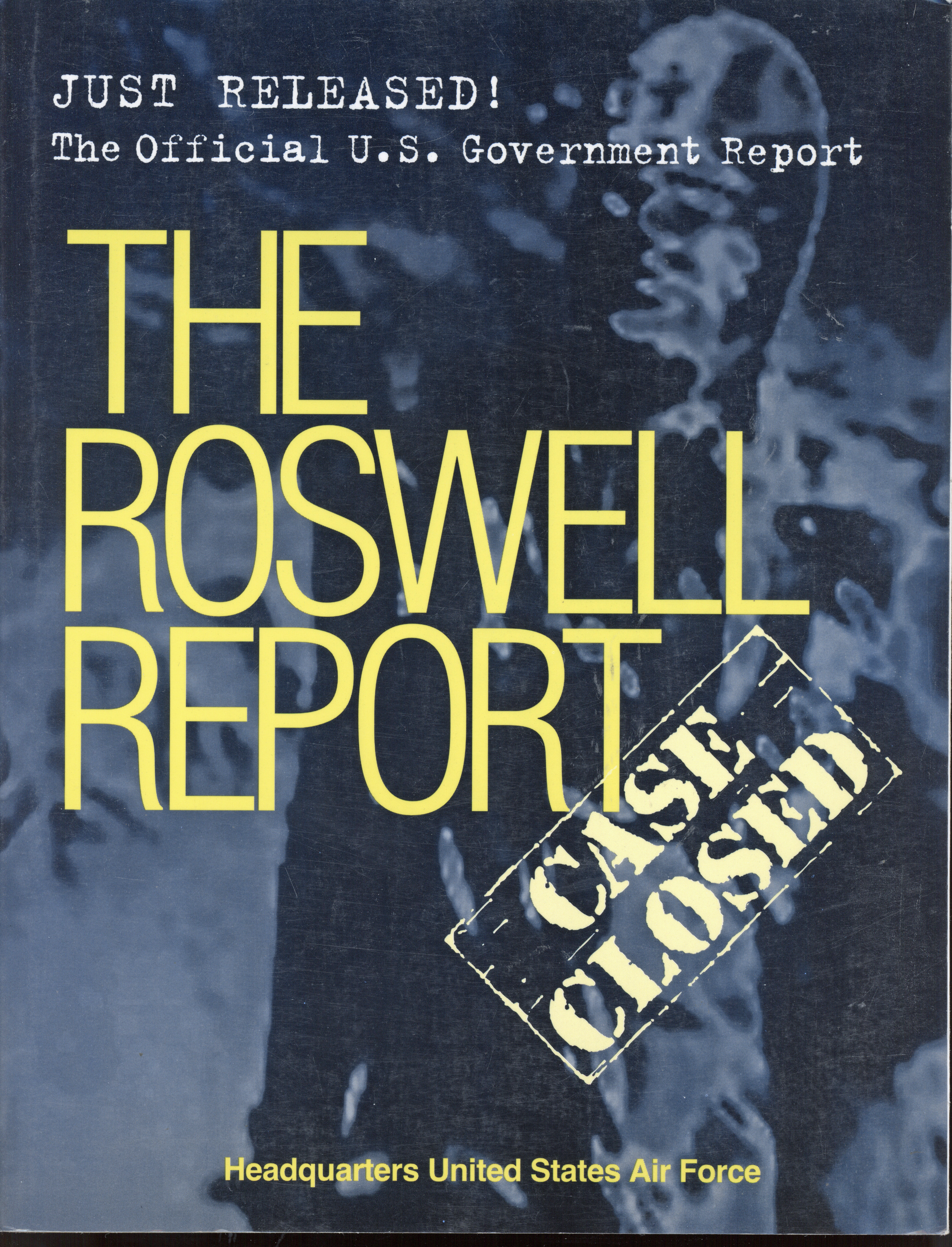
(1997)

USAF reports on Roswell

The Air Force provided official responses to Roswell conspiracy theories during the mid-1990s under pressure from New Mexico congressman Steven Schiff and the General Accounting Office (GAO). The initial 1994 USAF report admitted that the weather balloon explanation was a cover story for Project Mogul, a military surveillance program. Published the following year, The Roswell Report: Fact vs. Fiction in the New Mexico Desert supported this with extensive documentation that narrowed the cause of the debris to a specific Mogul balloon train launched on June 4, 1947, and lost near the Roswell debris field. Within the UFO community, the Air Force reports were not accepted, and ufologists noted that the GAO probe found no Roswell documents at the CIA and no information about the alleged Majestic 12 group. Contemporary polls found that the majority of Americans doubted the Air Force explanation.

News media and skeptical researchers embraced the findings. Project Mogul offered a cohesive explanation for the contemporary accounts of the debris – failing only to explain later conflicting additions. Carl Sagan and Phil Klass noted that aspects of the debris reported as anomalous – including the abstract symbols and lightweight foil – matched the materials used by Project Mogul. Mogul also matched the materials of the hypothetical "disc" as described in a 1947 FBI telex from Fort Worth, Texas. The telex said that according to the Eighth Air Force, "The disc is hexagonal in shape and was suspended from a balloon by cable, which balloon was approximately twenty feet (6.1 m) in diameter." On June 24, 1997, the Air Force published a second report, The Roswell Report: Case Closed. It detailed how eyewitness accounts of military personnel loading aliens into "body bags" matched the Air Force's procedures for retrieving parachute test dummies in insulation bags, designed to shield temperature-sensitive equipment in the desert.

== Later theories and hoaxes (1994–present) ==
=== Alien Autopsy ===
The 1995 film Alien Autopsy: Fact or Fiction (top) purported to show an alien recovered at Roswell. The extremely influential program was "aggressively satirized" the following year by The X-Files in a sequence (bottom) that "bears an uncanny resemblance in its visual style to the infamous Alien Autopsy".

Pseudo-documentaries, most notably Alien Autopsy: Fact or Fiction, have taken a major role in shaping popular opinion of Roswell. In 1995, British entrepreneur Ray Santilli claimed to have footage of an alien autopsy filmed after the 1947 Roswell crash, purchased from an elderly Army Air Force cameraman. Alien Autopsy centers around Santilli's hoaxed footage, which it presents as a probable artifact of the government's investigation into Roswell. The purported cameraman Barnett had died in 1967 without ever serving in the military, and visual effects expert Stan Winston told newspapers that Alien Autopsy had misrepresented his conclusion that Santilli's footage was an obvious fake. In a 2006 documentary, Santilli admitted that the footage was fabricated, filmed on a set built in a London living room.

Over twenty million viewers watched the purported autopsy. Fox aired the program immediately before and implicitly connected to the fictional X-Files, which later parodied the film. Alien Autopsy established a template for future pseudo-documentaries built on questioning a presumed government cover-up. Though thoroughly debunked, core UFO believers, many of whom still accepted earlier hoaxes like the Aztec crash, weighed the autopsy footage as additional evidence strengthening the connection between Roswell and extraterrestrials.

=== The Day After Roswell ===
In 1997, retired army intelligence officer Philip J. Corso released The Day After Roswell. Corso's book combined many existing and conflicting conspiracy theories with his own claims. Corso alleged that he was shown a purportedly nonhuman body suspended in liquid inside a glass coffin. The Day After Roswell contains many factual errors and inconsistencies. For example, Corso says the 1947 debris was "shipped to Fort Bliss, Texas, headquarters of the 8th Army Air Force". Other Roswell books place the 8th Army Air Force headquarters 500 miles away at its actual location, Fort Worth Army Air Field.

Corso further claimed that he helped oversee a project to reverse engineer recovered crash debris. Other ufologists expressed doubts about Corso's book. Schmitt openly questioned if Corso was "part of the disinformation" Schmitt believed was working to discredit ufology. Corso's story was criticized for its similarities to science fiction like The X-Files. Lacking evidence, the book relied on weight provided by Corso's past work on the Foreign Technology Division, and a foreword from US Senator and World War II veteran Strom Thurmond. Corso had misled Thurmond to believe he was providing a foreword for a different book. Upon discovering the book's actual contents, Thurmond demanded the publisher remove his name and writing from future printings stating, "I did not, and would not, pen the foreword to a book about, or containing, a suggestion that the success of the United States in the Cold War is attributable to the technology found on a crashed UFO."

=== Related debunked or fringe theories ===
Roswell has remained the subject of divergent popular works, including those by ufologist Walter Bosley, paranormal author Nick Redfern, and American journalist Annie Jacobsen. In 2011, Jacobsen's Area 51: An Uncensored History of America's Top Secret Military Base featured a claim that Nazi doctor Josef Mengele was recruited by Soviet leader Joseph Stalin to produce "grotesque, child-size aviators" to cause hysteria. The book was criticized for extensive errors by scientists from the Federation of American Scientists. Historian Richard Rhodes, writing in The Washington Post, also criticized the book's sensationalistic reporting of "old news" and its "error-ridden" reporting. He wrote: "All of [her main source's] claims appear in one or another of the various publicly available Roswell/UFO/Area 51 books and documents churned out by believers, charlatans and scholars over the past 60 years. In attributing the stories she reports to an unnamed engineer and Manhattan Project veteran while seemingly failing to conduct even minimal research into the man's sources, Jacobsen shows herself at a minimum extraordinarily gullible or journalistically incompetent."

In 2017, UK newspaper The Guardian reported on Kodachrome slides which some had claimed showed a dead space alien. First presented at a UFO conference in Mexico in May 2015, organized by Jaime Maussan and attended by almost 7,000 people, days afterwards it was revealed that the slides were in fact of a mummified Native American child discovered in 1896 and which had been on display at the Chapin Mesa Archeological Museum in Mesa Verde, Colorado, for many decades. In 2020, an Air Force historian revealed a recently declassified report of a circa-1951 incident in which two Roswell personnel donned poorly fitting radioactive suits, complete with oxygen masks, while retrieving a weather balloon after an atomic test. On one occasion, they encountered a lone woman in the desert, who fainted when she saw them. One of the personnel suggests they could have appeared to someone unaccustomed to then-modern gear, to be alien.

== Explanations ==
The Air Force reports identified a military program as the source of the 1947 debris and concluded that other alien crash accounts were likely misidentified military programs or accidents.

Secrecy around the 1947 debris recovery was due to Cold War military programs rather than aliens. Contrary to evidence, UFO believers maintain that a spacecraft crashed near Roswell, and "Roswell" remains synonymous with UFOs. B. D. Gildenberg has called Roswell "the world's most famous, most exhaustively investigated, and most thoroughly debunked UFO claim". Some accounts are likely distorted memories of recoveries of servicemen in plane crashes, or parachute test dummies, as suggested by the Air Force in their 1997 report. Pflock argues that proponents of the crashed-saucer explanation tend to overlook contradictions and absurdities, compiling supporting elements without adequate scrutiny. Kal Korff attributes the poor research standards to financial incentives, "Let's not pull any punches here: The Roswell UFO myth has been very good business for UFO groups, publishers, for Hollywood, the town of Roswell, the media, and UFOlogy ... [The] number of researchers who employ science and its disciplined methodology is appallingly small."

=== Project Mogul ===
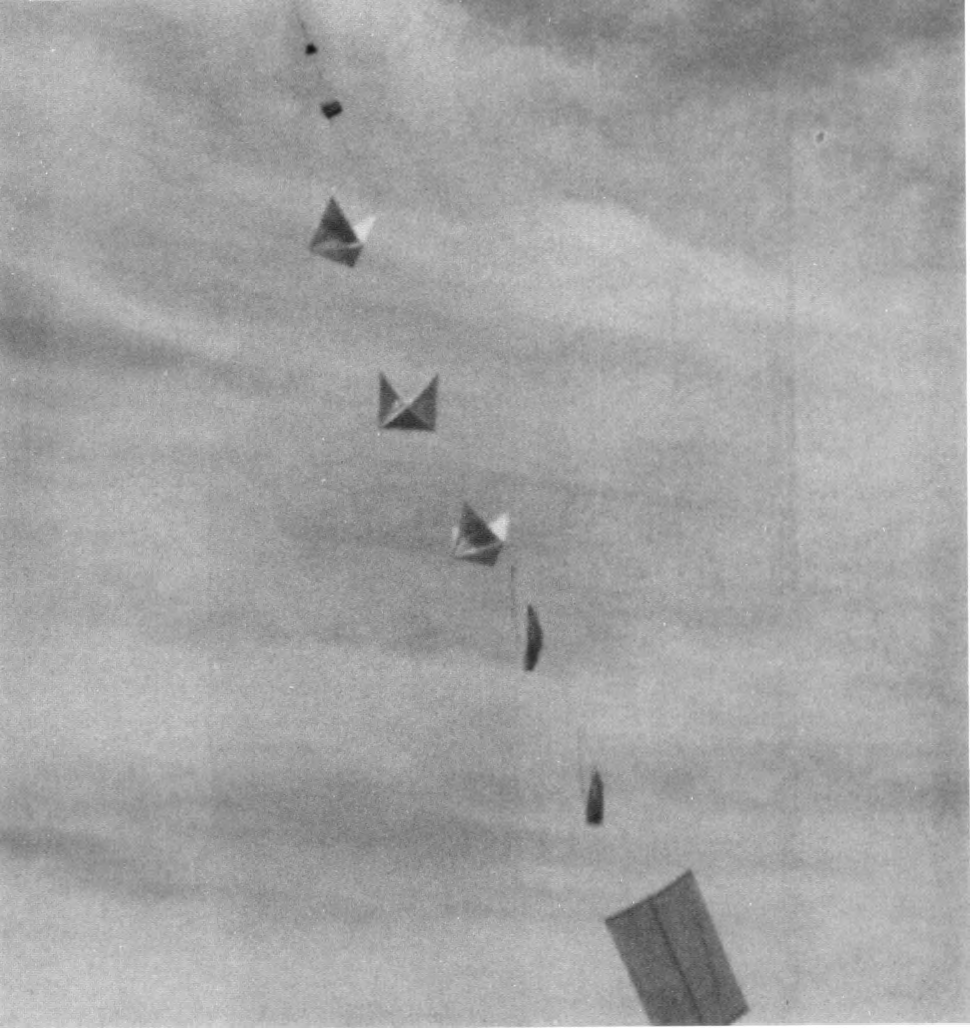
A Project Mogul array

A 1994 USAF report identified the crashed object from the 1947 incident as a Project Mogul device. Mogul – the classified portion of an unclassified New York University atmospheric research project – was a military surveillance program employing high-altitude balloons to monitor nuclear tests. The project launched Flight No. 4 from Alamogordo Army Air Field on June 4. Flight No. 4 was drifting toward Corona within 17 miles of Brazel's ranch when its tracking equipment failed. Major Jesse Marcel and USAF Brigadier General Thomas DuBose publicly described the claims of a weather balloon as a cover story in 1978 and 1991, respectively. In the USAF report, Richard Weaver states that the weather balloon story may have been intended to "deflect interest from" Mogul, or it may have been the perception of the weather officer because Mogul balloons were constructed from the same materials. Sheridan W. Cavitt, who accompanied Marcel to the debris field, provided a sworn witness statement for the report. Cavitt stated, "I thought at the time and think so now, that this debris was from a crashed balloon."

Ufologists had considered the possibility that the Roswell debris had come from a top-secret balloon. In March 1990, John Keel proposed that the debris had been from a Japanese balloon bomb launched in World War II. An Air Force meteorologist rejected Keel's theory, explaining that the Fu-Go balloons "could not possibly have stayed aloft for two years". Project Mogul was first connected to Roswell by independent researcher Robert G. Todd in 1990. Todd contacted ufologists and in the 1994 book Roswell in Perspective, Pflock agreed that the Brazel ranch debris was from Mogul. In response to a 1993 inquiry from US congressman Steven Schiff of New Mexico, the General Accounting Office launched an inquiry and directed the Office of the United States Secretary of the Air Force to conduct an internal investigation. Air Force declassification officer Lieutenant James McAndrew concluded:

When the civilians and personnel from Roswell AAF [...] 'stumbled' upon the highly classified project and collected the debris, no one at Roswell had a 'need to know' about information concerning MOGUL. This fact, along with the initial mis-identification and subsequent rumors that the 'capture' of a 'flying disc' occurred, ultimately left many people with unanswered questions that have endured to this day.

=== Anthropomorphic dummies ===
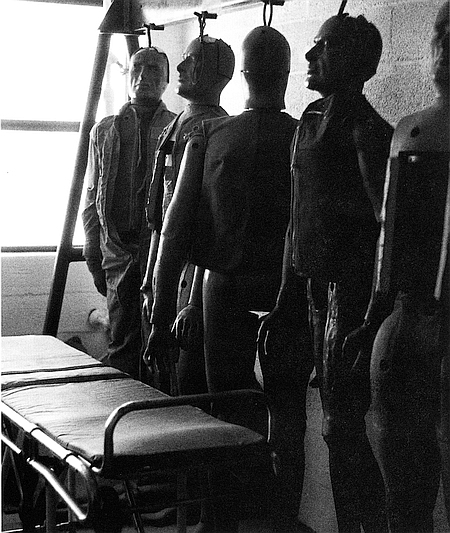
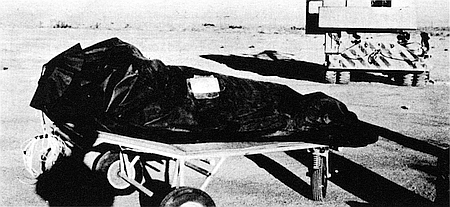
Anthropomorphic dummies were transported on medical gurneys and sometimes inside black insulation bags visually similar to "body bags" used for cadavers.

The 1947 Roswell accounts did not mention alien bodies. None of the primary eyewitnesses mentioned bodies. Roswell authors interviewed only four people with supposed firsthand knowledge of alien bodies. The claims of alien bodies – made decades later by elderly witnesses, sometimes as death-bed confessions – contradict each other in basic details such as the location of the crash, the number of extraterrestrials, and the description of the bodies.

The 1997 Air Force report concluded that the alleged "bodies" reported by later eyewitnesses came from memories of accidents involving military casualties and memories of the recovery of anthropomorphic dummies. Military programs, such as the 1950s Operation High Dive, released test dummies from high-altitude balloons above the New Mexico desert. The Air Force concluded that the number of accounts of body retrievals suggested an explanation other than dishonesty, and that the retrieval process for their dummies resembled the body retrieval stories in many aspects. The dummies were transported using stretchers, casket-shaped crates, and sometimes insulation bags that resembled body bags. Descriptions of "weapons carriers" and a "jeeplike truck that had a bunch of radios" matched the Dodge M37 used for 1950s test retrievals. Eyewitnesses described the purported bodies as bald, "dummies", resembling "plastic dolls", and wearing flight suits. These attributes were consistent with Air Force dummies used in the 1950s.

=== Roswell as modern myth and folklore ===
The mythology of Roswell involving increasingly elaborate accounts of alien crash landings and government cover-ups has been analyzed and documented by social anthropologists and skeptics. Anthropologists Susan Harding and Kathleen Stewart highlight the Roswell story as a prime example of how a discourse moved from the fringes to the mainstream, aligning with the 1980s zeitgeist of public fascination with "conspiracy, cover-up and repression". Skeptics Joe Nickell and James McGaha proposed that Roswell's time spent away from public attention allowed the development of a mythology drawing from later UFO folklore, and that the early debunking of the incident created space for ufologists to intentionally distort accounts towards sensationalism.

Charles Ziegler argues that the Roswell story exhibits characteristics typical of traditional folk narratives. He identifies six distinct narratives (Note: They are: Roswell Incident (1980), the Majestic 12 hoax, UFO Crash at Roswell (1991), Crash at Corona (1992), Roswell in Perspective (1994), and The Truth About the UFO Crash at Roswell (1994), with the "prototypical Aztec story" influencing all six. They are summarized in the Roswell incident development table.) and a process of transmission through storytellers, wherein a core story was formed from various witness accounts and then shaped and altered by those involved in the UFO community. Additional "witnesses" were sought to expand upon the core narrative, while accounts that did not align with the prevailing beliefs were discredited or excluded by the "gatekeepers".

Roswell incident development
	Debris	Site	Bodies
Documented historical events	Foil; Sticks; Durable paper; Rubber strips	Found near Corona, New Mexico on Brazel's ranch	None
Aztec hoax	Super-strong metal; Alien writing; Crashed spaceship	Crashed near Aztec, New Mexico	16 small humanoid alien corpses in crashed saucer
Roswell Incident (1980)	Super-strong lightweight metal sheets; Alien writing	Struck by lightning near Alamogordo, New Mexico; Crashed on the Plains of San Agustin	Small humanoid alien corpses near San Agustin
Majestic 12 hoax	Pieces of a "short-range reconnaissance craft"; Alien writing	Exploded north-west of Roswell; Scattered debris over a large area	4 badly decomposed humanoid corpses near Roswell
UFO Crash at Roswell (1991)	Super-strong lightweight metal sheets; Alien writing	Crashed once near Corona, New Mexico on Brazel's ranch; Crashed completely 2 miles southeast of Brazel's ranch	4 decomposed and partially eaten humanoid corpses near Roswell
Crash at Corona (1992)	Super-strong lightweight metal sheets; Alien writing	Landed once near Corona, New Mexico on Brazel's ranch; Exploded near Corona, New Mexico	4 humanoid corpses in escape pods near Roswell; 3 humanoid corpses near San Agustin; 1 surviving extraterrestrial humanoid near San Agustin
Roswell in Perspective (1994)	Fragments with symbols; Super-strong lightweight metal sheets; A narrow craft with "bat-like wings" north of Roswell	Landed once near Corona, New Mexico, on Brazel's ranch; Struck a cliff 35 miles north of Roswell	3 humanoid corpses north of Roswell; 1 living humanoid pilot north of Roswell
The Truth About the UFO Crash at Roswell (1994)	Super-strong lightweight metal sheets; An intact craft with "bat-like wings"	Landed once near Corona, New Mexico on Brazel's ranch; Crashed once near Brazel's ranch; Crashed completely into cliff north of Roswell	3 humanoid corpses in the craft; 1 surviving extraterrestrial in the craft

== Cultural impact ==
=== Tourism and commercialization ===
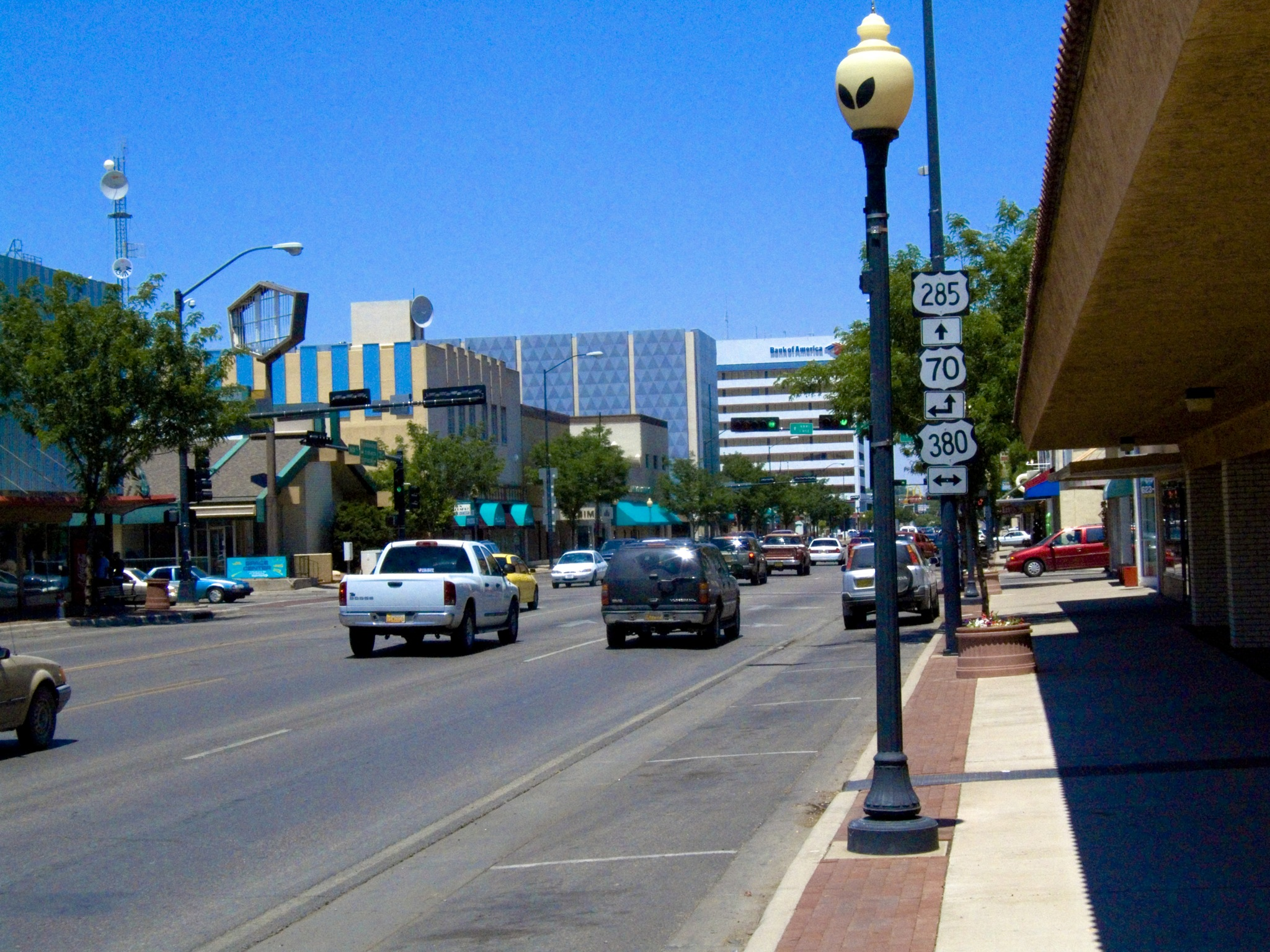
Alien-themed street light on Main Street in Roswell

Roswell's tourism industry is based on ufology museums and businesses, as well as alien-themed iconography and alien kitsch. Many typical city features in Roswell are UFO-themed, including fast food restaurants, grocery stores, and street lights. A broad range of establishments offer UFO items. A yearly UFO festival has been held since 1995. Several alleged crash sites are open to visitors for a fee. There are alien festivals, conventions, and museums, including the International UFO Museum and Research Center. Around 90,000 tourists visit Roswell each year.

=== Popular fiction ===
The incident spread internationally through films depicting the key points of Roswell conspiracy theories. In the 1980 independently distributed film Hangar 18, an alien ship crashes in the desert of the US Southwest. Debris and bodies are recovered, but their existence is covered up by the government. Director James L. Conway summarized the film as "a modern-day dramatization of the Roswell incident". Conway later revisited the concept in 1995 when he filmed the Star Trek: Deep Space Nine episode "Little Green Men"; in that episode, characters travel to 1947, triggering the Roswell incident, with their ship being stored in Hangar 18. In the 1996 film Independence Day, an alien invasion prompts the revelation of a Roswell crash and cover-up, including experiments on alien corpses. The 2008 film Indiana Jones and the Kingdom of the Crystal Skull sees the titular protagonist on a quest for an alien body from the Roswell Incident.

In the 1990s, Roswell became the most well-known of the early flying saucer accounts, due in part to frequent portrayals of a Roswell conspiracy on television. The hit series The X-Files featured the Roswell incident as a recurring element. The show's second episode "Deep Throat", introduced a Roswell alien crash into the show's mythology. The comical 1996 episode "Jose Chung's From Outer Space" satirized the recently broadcast Santilli Alien Autopsy hoax film. After the success of The X-Files, Roswell alien conspiracies were featured in other sci-fi drama series, including Dark Skies (1996–97) and Taken (2002). The animated series Roswell Conspiracies: Aliens, Myths and Legends (1999–2000) follows a secret peacekeeping agency based in Roswell, who staged the incident as a distraction to conceal the existence of real alien invaders. Starting in 1998, Pocket Books published a series of young adult novels titled Roswell High; from 1999 to 2002, the books were adapted into the WB/UPN TV series Roswell, with a second adaption released in 2019 under the title Roswell, New Mexico.

Journalist Toby Smith has described Roswell as the "embarkation point" for mass media and pop culture treatment of UFOs, crashed saucers, and aliens on Earth. In a 2001 episode of the animated comedy Futurama, titled "Roswell That Ends Well", protagonists from the 31st century travel back in time and cause the Roswell incident. The animated series American Dad! features an alien named Roger who crashed at Roswell. The 2006 comedy Alien Autopsy revolves around the 1990s creation of the Santilli hoax film. The 2011 Simon Pegg comedy Paul tells the story of Roswell tourists who rescue a grey alien. Steven Spielberg's 2026 film Disclosure Day portrays the Roswell incident as the beginning of encounters from an alien civilization the U.S. government covered up, which the main characters of the film reveal to the world.

=== Statements by US presidents ===
Widespread speculation of a cover-up led to United States presidents being questioned about the Roswell incident. In a 2014 interview, Bill Clinton said, "When the Roswell thing came up, I knew we'd get gazillions of letters. So I had all the Roswell papers reviewed, everything". Clinton's administration found no evidence of alien contact or a crashed ship. When asked during a 2015 interview with GQ magazine about whether he had looked at top-secret classified information, Barack Obama replied, "I gotta tell you, it's a little disappointing. People always ask me about Roswell and the aliens and UFOs, and it turns out the stuff going on that's top secret isn't nearly as exciting as you expect. In this day and age, it's not as top secret as you'd think." In December 2020, Obama joked with Stephen Colbert, "It used to be that UFOs and Roswell was the biggest conspiracy. And now that seems so tame, the idea that the government might have an alien spaceship." In June 2020, Donald Trump, when asked if he would consider releasing more information about the Roswell incident, said, "I won't talk to you about what I know about it, but it's very interesting."

== See also ==
- Area 51 and Storm Area 51
- 1952 Washington, D.C., UFO incident
- Kecksburg UFO incident
- List of conspiracy theories
- List of reported UFO sightings
- Nazi UFOs
- Pentagon UFO videos
- Project Blue Book
- UFO sightings in the United States

== Notes and references ==
=== Sources ===
- "AAF Whips up a Disc Flurry". The Journal Herald. July 9, 1947 – via Newspapers.com.
- "Aliens Changed Roswell, Even Without Proof". ABC News. February 24, 2005. Archived from the original on March 6, 2005.
- "Air Force Freezes UFO Story". Ann Arbor Sun. Zodiac News Service. November 1, 1974 – via Ann Arbor District Library.
- Baker, Nicholson (January 31, 2024). "How We Lost Our Minds About UFOs". New York Magazine.
- Beeler, Stan (2010). "Roswell". In Lavery, David (ed.). The Essential Cult TV Reader. Lexington: University Press of Kentucky. ISBN 978-0-8131-2568-8.
- Berlitz, Charles; Moore, William (1980). The Roswell Incident. New York: Grosset & Dunlap. ISBN 978-0-448-21199-2.
- Blum, Howard (1990). Out There: The Government's Secret Quest for Extraterrestrials. New York: Simon and Schuster. ISBN 978-0-671-66260-8.
- Broad, William J. (June 24, 1997). "Air Force Debunks Roswell UFO Story". The Day. The New York Times News Service. Archived from the original on April 3, 2016 – via Google News.
- Bullard, Thomas E. (2016). The Myth and Mystery of UFOs. Lawrence: University Press of Kansas. ISBN 978-0-7006-2338-9.
- Campbell, Richard H. (2005). The Silverplate Bombers: a History and Registry of the Enola Gay and Other B-29s Configured to Carry Atomic Bombs. Jefferson, North Carolina: McFarland & Company. ISBN 978-0-7864-2139-8.
- Carey, Thomas J.; Schmitt, Donald R. (2020). Roswell: the Ultimate Cold Case: Eyewitness Testimony and Evidence of Contact and the Cover-up. Newburyport, Massachusetts: Red Wheel/Weiser. ISBN 978-1-63265-170-9.
- Carpenter, Les (September 30, 2017). "The Curious Case of the Alien in the Photo and the Mystery that Took Years to Solve". The Guardian. Archived from the original on September 30, 2017.
- Carr, Timothy (July 1997). "Son of Originator of 'Alien Autopsy' Story Casts Doubt on Father's Credibility" (PDF). Skeptical Inquirer. Vol. 21, no. 4.
- Charles, Tom (July 11, 1947). "'Flying Discs' May Be Air Field Balloons". El Paso Times – via Newspapers.com.
- Clancy, Susan A. (2007). Abducted: How People Come to Believe They Were Kidnapped by Aliens (First paperback ed.). Cambridge, Massachusetts: Harvard University Press. ISBN 978-0-674-02401-4.
- Clarke, David (2015). How UFOs Conquered the World: the History of a Modern Myth. London: Aurum Press Ltd. ISBN 978-1-78131-472-2.
- Conway, James L. (February 16, 2012). "Catching up with Director James L. Conway, Part 1". StarTrek.com (Interview). Paramount.
- Cordero, Rosy (May 12, 2022). "The CW's 'Roswell, New Mexico' Canceled After Four Seasons". Deadline Hollywood.
- Corso, Philip J.; Birnes, William J. (1997). The Day After Roswell. New York: Pocket Books. ISBN 978-0-671-00461-3.
- Dept. of Air Force (July 1994). "Report of Air Force Research Regarding the 'Roswell Incident'" (PDF) (Report). US Air Force.
- Diaz, Eric (December 7, 2020). "President Obama Admits He Was Briefed on UFO Sightings". Nerdist. Archived from the original on April 27, 2021.
- Disch, Thomas M. (July 5, 2000). The Dreams Our Stuff Is Made of: How Science Fiction Conquered the World. New York: Simon and Schuster. ISBN 978-0-684-85978-1.
- Dunning, Brian (December 18, 2007). "Aliens in Roswell". Skeptoid.
- Ebert, Roger (March 16, 2011). "Phone Home? Dude, I'm into Texting". RogerEbert.com.
- Erdmann, Terry J.; Block, Paula M. (2000). Deep Space Nine Companion. New York: Simon and Schuster. ISBN 978-0-671-50106-8.
- "Exploded Rumor". Fort Worth Star-Telegram. Fort Worth, TX. July 9, 1947 – via Newspapers.com.
- "Flying Disc Found; in Army Possession". The Bakersfield Californian. Associated Press. July 8, 1947 – via Archive.org.
- Frank, Adam (2023). The Little Book of Aliens (ebook ed.). New York: Harper. ISBN 978-0-06-327977-3.
- Frazier, Kendrick (July 16, 2017a). "Roswell Myth Lives on Despite the Established Facts". Albuquerque Journal. Archived from the original on January 11, 2022.
- Frazier, Kendrick (2017b). "The Roswell Incident at 70: Facts, Not Myths". Skeptical Inquirer. Vol. 41, no. 6. Archived from the original on July 20, 2018.
- Friedman, Stanton; Berliner, Don (1997) [1992]. Crash at Corona: The US Military Retrieval and Cover-Up of a UFO (Paperback ed.). New York: Marlowe & Co. ISBN 978-1-56924-863-8.
- Frost, Warwick; Laing, Jennifer (December 9, 2013). Commemorative Events: Memory, Identities, Conflict. Abingdon, Oxfordshire: Routledge. ISBN 978-0-415-69060-7.
- Fuller, John G. (1966). Incident at Exeter. New York: G. P. Putnam's Sons. OCLC 712083.
- Gerhart, Ann; Groer, Ann (June 6, 1997). "The Reliable Source". Washington Post.
- Gildenberg, B. D. (Spring 2003). "A Roswell Requiem". Skeptic. Vol. 10, no. 1 – via Gale Academic OneFile.
- Goldberg, Robert Alan (2001). "Chapter 6: The Roswell Incident". Enemies Within: the Culture of Conspiracy in Modern America. New Haven, Connecticut: Yale University Press. ISBN 978-0-300-13294-6.
- Gulyas, Aaron John (2014). The Chaos Conundrum: Essays on UFOs, Ghosts & Other High Strangeness in Our Non-Rational and Atemporal World. Luton, Bedfordshire: Andrews UK Limited. ISBN 978-0-9916975-8-8.
- Gulyas, Aaron John (2016). Conspiracy Theories: the Roots, Themes and Propagation of Paranoid Political and Cultural Narratives. Jefferson, North Carolina: McFarland. ISBN 978-1-4766-2349-8.
- Handlen, Zach (January 17, 2013). "Star Trek: Deep Space Nine: 'Little Green Men'/'The Sword Of Kahless'". TV Club. Archived from the original on April 18, 2021.
- Handlen, Zach (May 28, 2015). "Futurama: 'Roswell that Ends Well'/'Anthology of Interest II'". TV Club. Archived from the original on November 4, 2019.
- "Harassed Rancher Who Located 'Saucer' Sorry He Told About It". Roswell Daily Record. July 9, 1947.
- Harding, Susan; Stewart, Kathleen (2003). "Chapter 9: Anxieties of influence: Conspiracy Theory and Therapeutic Culture in Millennial America". In West, Harry G.; Sanders, Todd (eds.). Transparency and Conspiracy: Ethnographies of Suspicion in the New World Order. Durham, North Carolina: Duke University Press. ISBN 978-0-8223-8485-4.
- Harding, Thomas (May 13, 2011). "Roswell 'Was Soviet Plot to Create US Panic'". The Daily Telegraph. Archived from the original on May 20, 2011.
- Huyghe, Patrick (2001). "Chapter 24: Blaming the Japanese for Roswell". Swamp Gas Times: My Two Decades on the UFO Beat (Second ed.). New York: Paraview Press. ISBN 978-1-931044-27-1.
- Jones, Jack (October 12, 1974). "No Green Men Here, Base Officials Say". Dayton Daily News – via Newspapers.com.
- Joseph, Brad (2008). "Beyond the Textbook: Studying Roswell in the Social Studies Classroom". Social Studies. 99 (3): 132–134. doi:10.3200/TSSS.99.3.132-134. S2CID 145375518.
- Klass, Philip (January 1997a). "The Klass Files" (PDF). The Skeptics UFO Newsletter. Vol. 43. The Committee for Skeptical Inquiry. Archived from the original on April 19, 2013.
- Klass, Philip (1997b). The Real Roswell Crashed-Saucer Coverup. Amherst, New York: Prometheus Books. ISBN 978-1-57392-164-0.
- Klass, Philip (January 1998). "The Klass Files" (PDF). The Skeptics UFO Newsletter. Vol. 49. The Committee for Skeptical Inquiry. Archived from the original on December 24, 2013.
- Klaver, Elizabeth (2012). Sites of Autopsy in Contemporary Culture. Albany: State University of New York Press. ISBN 978-0791483428.
- Kloor, Keith (2019). "UFOs Won't Go Away". Issues in Science and Technology. 35 (3): 39–56. JSTOR 26949023.
- Knight, Peter (2013). Conspiracy Culture: from Kennedy to the X Files. Abingdon, Oxfordshire: Routledge. ISBN 978-1-135-11731-3.
- Kopan, Tal (April 3, 2014). "Bill Clinton Phones Home on Aliens". Politico. Archived from the original on April 19, 2021.
- Korff, Kal (1997a). The Roswell UFO Crash: What They Don't Want You to Know (First ed.). Amherst, New York: Prometheus Books. ISBN 978-1-57392-127-5.
- Korff, Kal (August 1997b). "What Really Happened at Roswell". Skeptical Inquirer. Vol. 21, no. 4. Archived from the original on April 18, 2014.
- Kottmeyer, Martin S. (2017). "Why Have UFOs Changed Speed Over the Years?". In Grossman, Wendy M.; French, Christopher C. (eds.). Why Statues Weep: the Best of the "Skeptic". Abingdon, Oxfordshire: Routledge. ISBN 978-1134962525.
- Lagerfield, Nathalie (June 24, 2016). "How an Alien Autopsy Hoax Captured the World's Imagination for a Decade". Time. Archived from the original on April 18, 2021.
- Lavery, David; Hague, Angela; Cartwright, Maria (1996). Deny All Knowledge: Reading the X-Files. Syracuse, New York: Syracuse University Press. ISBN 978-0-8156-2717-3.
- "Legend: Roswell Crash and Area 51". Unsolved Mysteries. Season 6. Episode 33. September 18, 1994. NBC – via FilmRise True Crime.
- LeMay, John (December 9, 2008). Roswell. Charleston, South Carolina: Arcadia Publishing. ISBN 978-0-7385-5854-7.
- Levy, Michael M; Mendlesohn, Farah (2019). Aliens in Popular Culture. Santa Barbara, California: ABC-CLIO. ISBN 978-1-4408-3833-0.
- Madhani, Aamer (June 19, 2020). "Trump Says He's Heard 'Interesting' Things About Roswell". Military Times. Archived from the original on April 28, 2021.
- May, Andrew (2016). Pseudoscience and Science Fiction. Cham, Zug: Springer International. ISBN 978-3-319-42605-1.
- McAndrew, James (1997). The Roswell Report: Case Closed (PDF). Washington, DC: US Government Printing Office. ISBN 978-0-16-049018-7.
- McAndrew, James (writer); Hukle, Don (narrator); Costello, Owen (March 30, 1997). The Roswell Reports. Vol. 1. US Air Force – via C-SPAN. National Archives Identifier: 2788598.
- Meehan, Paul (August 17, 2023). Alien Abduction in the Cinema: a History From the 1950s to Today. Jefferson, North Carolina: McFarland. ISBN 978-1-4766-8827-5 – via Google Books.
- Moore, Bill; Pratt, Bob (2007) [9 July 1982]. "Pratt Sensitive" (PDF) (Transcript of tape-recorded conversation). Archived from the original (PDF) on February 27, 2008.
- Neale, Rick (February 8, 2020). "Stranger Things?". Florida Today. Archived from the original on February 8, 2020.
- "New Mexico Rancher's 'Flying Disk' Proves to Be Weather Balloon-Kite". Fort Worth Star-Telegram (Morning, 5 star ed.). Fort Worth, TX. July 9, 1947 – via Newspapers.com.
- Nickell, Joe; McGaha, James (May–June 2012). "The Roswellian Syndrome: How Some UFO Myths Develop". Skeptical Inquirer. Vol. 36, no. 3. Committee for Skeptical Inquiry. Archived from the original on January 26, 2013.
- Norris, Robert; Richelson, Jeffrey (July 11, 2011). "Dreamland Fantasies". Washington Decoded. Archived from the original on March 5, 2013.
- Olmsted, Kathryn S. (2009). "Chapter 6: Trust No One: Conspiracies and Conspiracy Theories from the 1970s to the 1990s". Real Enemies: Conspiracy Theories and American Democracy, World War I to 9/11. Oxford University Press. ISBN 978-0-19-975395-6.
- Peebles, Curtis (1994). Watch the Skies!: A Chronicle of the Flying Saucer Myth. Washington, DC: The Smithsonian Institution. ISBN 978-1-56098-343-9.
- Pflock, Karl (2001). Roswell: Inconvenient Facts and the Will to Believe. Amherst, New York: Prometheus Books. ISBN 978-1-57392-894-6.
- Pratt, Bob (February 26, 1980). "Former Intelligence Officer Reveals...I Picked up Wreckage of UFO that Exploded over US". National Enquirer.
- Randle, Kevin; Schmitt, Donald (1991). UFO Crash at Roswell. New York: Avon Books. ISBN 978-0-380-76196-8.
- Randle, Kevin; Schmitt, Donald (1994). The Truth About the UFO Crash at Roswell (Hardcover ed.). New York: M Evans. ISBN 978-0-87131-761-2.
- Rhodes, Richard (June 3, 2011). "Annie Jacobsen's "Area 51," the US Top-Secret Military Base". The Washington Post. Archived from the original on November 10, 2015.
- Rich, Alan (July 29, 1994). "Roswell". Variety. Penske Media.
- Ricketts, Jeremy R. (2011). "Land of (Re) Enchantment: Tourism and Sacred Space at Roswell and Chimayó, New Mexico". Journal of the Southwest. 53 (2): 239–261. doi:10.1353/jsw.2011.0004. JSTOR 41710086. S2CID 133475439.
- "Roswell Author Who Said He Handled UFO Crash Debris Dies at 76". The Guardian. Associated Press. August 8, 2013. Archived from the original on January 16, 2023.
- Sagan, Carl (1997). The Demon-Haunted World (Paperback ed.). London: Headline. ISBN 978-0-7472-5156-9.
- Saler, Benson; Ziegler, Charles; Moore, Charles (1997). UFO Crash at Roswell: the Genesis of a Modern Myth. Washington, DC: Smithsonian Institution Press. ISBN 978-1-56098-751-2.
- Severson, Thor (October 14, 1952). "Little Men Due Soon: Flying Saucer Landing Forecast". The Denver Post. Photograph by David Mathias.
- Siegler, Kirk; Baker, Liz (June 5, 2021). "The Truth Is (Still) Out There in 'UFO Capital' Roswell, New Mexico". NPR.
- Simmons, Bill (November 17, 2015). "Bill Simmons Interviews President Obama, GQ's 2015 Man of the Year". GQ. Archived from the original on November 5, 2017.
- Smith, Toby (2000). Little Gray Men: Roswell and the Rise of a Popular Culture. Albuquerque: University of New Mexico Press. ISBN 978-0-8263-2121-3.
- "The Roswell Files". TIME. Vol. 149, no. 25. June 23, 1997. Archived from the original on February 19, 2025.
- Thompson, Fritz (October 27, 1991). "The Roswell Incident". Albuquerque Journal – via Newspapers.com.
- "Top 5 Roswell References in Movies and TV". Entertainment.ie. July 9, 2013. Archived from the original on July 8, 2022.
- "Twin Falls Falling Disc Proves Ingenious Hoax of 4 Teen-age Boys". Deseret News. July 12, 1947 – via Newspapers.com.
- "UFO Coverup". In Search of... Season 5. Episode 1. September 20, 1980.
- Weaver, Richard; McAndrew, James (1995). The Roswell Report: Fact Versus Fiction in the New Mexico Desert (PDF). Washington, D.C.: United States Air Force. ISBN 978-0-16-048023-2. Archived from the original (PDF) on February 16, 2013.
- Weeks, Andy (2015). Forgotten Tales of Idaho. Charleston, South Carolina: The History Press. ISBN 978-1-62585-246-5.
- Wright, Susan (1998). UFO Headquarters: Investigations on Current Extraterrestrial Activity in Area 51. New York: St. Martin's Press. ISBN 978-0-312-20781-6.
- Yardley, Mike (March 19, 2019). "Roswell: the Truth is Out There". The New Zealand Herald.
- Young, James Michael (Winter 2020). "The US Air Force's Long Range Detection Program and Project MOGUL". Air Power History. 67 (4): 25–32. JSTOR 26965566.
