= Kevin D. Randle =

American ufologist

Kevin Douglas Randle
- Born: June 4, 1949 (age 77); Cheyenne, Wyoming, U.S.
- Military career
- Branch: United States Army; United States Air Force; Iowa National Guard
- Service years: 1968–2009
- Rank: lieutenant colonel
- Conflicts: Vietnam War; Iraq War
- Awards: Distinguished Flying Cross; Bronze Star Medal; Air Medal with Combat "V" device, 41 oak leaf clusters; Combat Action Badge
- Other work: writer of science fiction and historical fiction

Kevin Douglas Randle (born June 4, 1949) is an American ufologist, science fiction and historical fiction writer and a military veteran. Within the UFO community, he is often regarded as one of the preeminent experts on the reported crash of a UFO near Roswell, New Mexico in July 1947.

A writer with more than 80 books to his credit, Randle is perhaps best known for his books about UFOs and the Roswell story. While the vast majority of his books are science fiction and historical fiction, it's his books on the accounts of the Roswell story, New Mexico in 1947 that have exerted an enormous influence on those interested in the saga. Randle, along with Stanton Friedman, is generally acknowledged as one of the leading researchers into the Roswell story and the UFO question. He continues to work in the UFO field, although lately he has concentrated more on his science fiction books than UFO research. He is a brother of Brian D. Platt.

== Military service ==
Kevin Randle served in the United States Army during both the Vietnam War and the Iraq War.

In Vietnam, Randle piloted UH-1 helicopters while assigned to the 116th Assault Helicopter Company based at Cu Chi, and later with the 187th Assault Helicopter Company stationed at Tay Ninh.

Between the Vietnam War and the War in Iraq, Randle was in the United States Air Force, both on active duty and in the active reserves. In the Air Force, Randle pulled duty as a public affairs officer, a general's aide, and an intelligence officer. He was promoted several times and completed his Air Force Reserve duty as a captain and the director of intelligence for an airlift group.

After the September 11 attacks on the World Trade Center, Randle joined the Iowa National Guard as an intelligence officer. His unit, the 234th Signal Battalion, deployed in Iraq in June 2003, to the Baghdad International Airport, returning in May 2004. Randle was awarded a Combat Action Badge for his participation in several firefights in Iraq. Randle retired from the Iowa National Guard as a lieutenant colonel in 2009.

== Education ==
Randle studied journalism at the University of Iowa (BA). He earned a master's degree in psychology, as well as a Ph.D. from California Coast University and a second master's degree in military studies, from the American Military University.

== Writing career ==
Randle began his study of UFOs while still a high school student. In 1972 he published his first article about UFOs in Saga's Annual UFO Report. Throughout the 1970s, he published a number of articles concerning a variety of UFO sightings including tales of alien abduction, photographic cases, and those involving some sort of physical evidence. In 1975 he was asked by Jim Lorenzen to investigate the wave of cattle mutilations that were sweeping the Midwest and west.

Randle's writing is not limited to the UFO field. He is the author of more than 100 books including action-adventure, mysteries, and science fiction. He has also written more than two hundred magazine articles including his exploration of Iowa's Cold Water Cave and accounts of the war in Vietnam. A magazine article in Soldier of Fortune magazine recounted an Easter Sunday (2004) firefight that took place on the western perimeter of Baghdad Airport.

Interviewed by Skeptical Inquirer's Robert Sheaffer Randle was asked about his current status of belief in UFOs. When asked what does he think is credible evidence for the existence of UFOs, he stated that he believes that a UFO crashed in Roswell, and that possibly there may be truth to the story that a UFO crashed in Shag Harbour in 1967. But Randle feels that most abductees are "describing sleep paralysis"..."many of these supposed abductees are very impressionable and are easily led by a hypnotist". About ongoing research for proof of aliens, "...we said this field...had not progressed in over twenty years. It's now been another ten or twelve years, and it still has not progressed." In conclusion Randle says, "I set a very high bar for the level of evidence required. There are very few authentic UFO cases. However, some skeptical explanations don't fit the facts. Still, I'm getting more skeptical in my old age." In the opinion of interviewer Sheaffer, Randle "gives more weight to 'eyewitness testimony' than skeptics typically do." In a later interview with Sheaffer, Randle indicated, with regard to Roswell, that "he was no longer sure what actually happened, and that he feels the case for ET involvement is no longer robust."

== Bibliography ==
=== Works about UFOs ===
- Roswell in the 21st Century: the Evidence as it Exists Today (2016)
- The Abduction Enigma with William P. Cone and Russ Estes (2000)
- Case MJ-12: The True Story Behind the Government's UFO Conspiracies (2002)
- Conclusions On Operation Majestic Twelve (1994)
- Conspiracy of Silence: From Roswell to Project Blue Book - What the Government Doesn't Want You to Know about UFOs (1997) ISBN 0380726912
- Crash: When UFOs Fall From the Sky: A History of Famous Incidents, Conspiracies, and Cover-Ups (2010)
- Faces of the Visitors with Russ Estes (1997)
- A History of UFO Crashes (1995)
- Invasion Washington: UFOs Over the Capitol (2001)
- The October Scenario: UFO Abductions, Theories About Them and a Prediction of When They Will Return (1988/2019)
- Project Blue Book Exposed (1998)
- Project Moon Dust: Beyond Roswell - Exposing The Government's Covert Investigations And Cover-ups (1999)
- The Randle Report: UFOs in the '90s (1998)
- Reflections of a UFO Investigator (2012)
- The Report On the Conclusions of the Recent Air Force Analysis of the Roswell Incident with Donald R. Schmitt (self-published, 1994)
- The Roswell Encyclopedia (2000)
- Roswell UFO Crash Update: Exposing the Military Cover-Up of the Century
- Roswell, UFOs and the Unusual
- Scientific Ufology: Roswell and Beyond - How Scientific Methodology Can Prove the Reality of UFOs (2000)
- The Spaceships of the Visitors: An Illustrated Guide to Alien Spacecraft with Russ Estes (2000)
- The Truth About the UFO Crash at Roswell with Donald R. Schmitt (1997)
- The UFO Casebook (1989)
- UFO Crash at Roswell with Donald R. Schmitt (1991)

=== Science fiction ===
- The Exploration Chronicles
  - Signals (2003)
  - Starship (2003)
  - F.T.L. (2004)
  - The Gate (2006)
- Jefferson's War series
  - The Galactic Silver Star (1990)
  - The Price of Command (1990)
  - The Lost Colony (1991)
  - The January Platoon (1991)
  - Death of a Regiment (1991)
  - Chain of Command (1992)
- Galactic MI series
  - Galactic MI (1993)
  - The Rat Trap (1993)
  - The Citadel (1994)
- Operation Roswell (2002)
- Seeds of War series
  - Seeds of War with Robert Cornett (1986)
  - The Aldebaran Campaign with Robert Cornett (1988)
  - The Aquarian Attack with Robert Cornett (1989)
- Star Precinct series
  - Star Precinct with Richard Driscoll (Ed Gorman) (1992)
  - Star Precinct 2: Mind Slayer with Richard Driscoll (Ed Gorman) (1992)
  - Star Precinct 3: Inside Job with Richard Driscoll (Ed Gorman) (1992)
- Global War series
  - Dawn of Conflict (1991) ISBN 0553294369
  - Border Winds (1992)
- Time Mercenaries series
  - Remember the Alamo! (with Robert Cornett) (1986)
  - Remember Gettysburg (with Robert Cornett) (1988)
  - Remember the Little Bighorn (with Robert Cornett) (1990)
- On the Second Tuesday of Next Week

=== Writing as Eric Helm ===
==== Scorpion Squad ====
- Body Count (1984)
- The Nhu Ky Sting (1984)
- Chopper Command (1985)
- River Raid (1985)

==== Vietnam: Ground Zero ====
- Vietnam: Ground Zero (1986)
- P.O.W. (1986)
- Unconfirmed Kill (1986)
- The Fall of Camp A555 (1987)
- Soldier's Medal (1987)
- The Kit Carson Scout (1987)
- The Hobo Woods (1987)
- Guidelines (1987)
- The Ville (1987)
- Incident at Plei Soi (1988)
- Tet (1988)
- The Iron Triangle (1988)
- Red Dust (1988)
- Hamlet (1988)
- Moon Cusser (1988)
- Dragon's Jaw (1989)
- Cambodian Sanctuary (1989)
- Payback (1989)
- Macv (1989)
- Tan Son Nhut (1989)
- Puppet Soldiers (1989)
- Gunfighter (1990)
- Warrior (1990)
- Target (1990)
- Warlord (1990)
- Spike (1990)
- Recon (1990)
- Pioneer Post (2024)
- Proxy War (2024)

==== Super Vietnam Ground Zero ====
- The Raid (1988)
- Shifting Fires (1988)
- Strike (1989)
- Empire (1989)
- Sniper (1990)

==== SEALS ====
- Crisis! (2024)
- Treasure! (2024)

=== Writing as Steve MacKenzie ===
- SEALS series
  - Ambush (1987)
  - Blackbird (1987)
  - Desert Raid (1988)
  - Infiltrate (1988)
  - Assault (1988)
  - Sniper (1988)
  - Attack (1989)
  - Stronghold (1989)
  - Treasure (1989)

=== Other works ===
- Death Before Dishonor with John Gatliff and Lawrence Kubik (1987) ISBN 0380752824
- Lost Gold & Buried Treasure: A Treasure Hunter's Guide to 250 Fortunes Waiting to Be Found (1995)
- Once Upon a Murder with Robert J. Randisi (1987)
- To Touch the Light (1994)
- Spanish Gold (1990)
- Vampyr? (2010)
