= Walter Haut =

American public information officer (1922–2005)

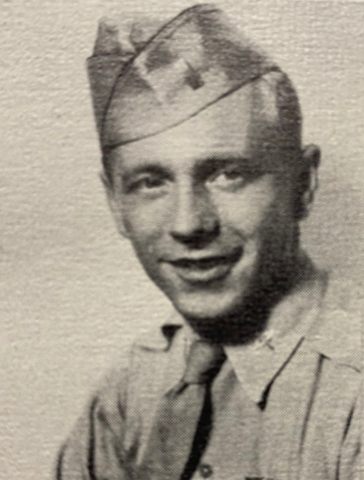
Haut in 1947

1st Lt. Walter Haut (June 3, 1922 – December 15, 2005) was the public information officer (PIO) at the 509th Atomic Bomb Group based in Roswell, New Mexico, during 1947. Haut issued the initial "flying disc" press release during the Roswell incident.

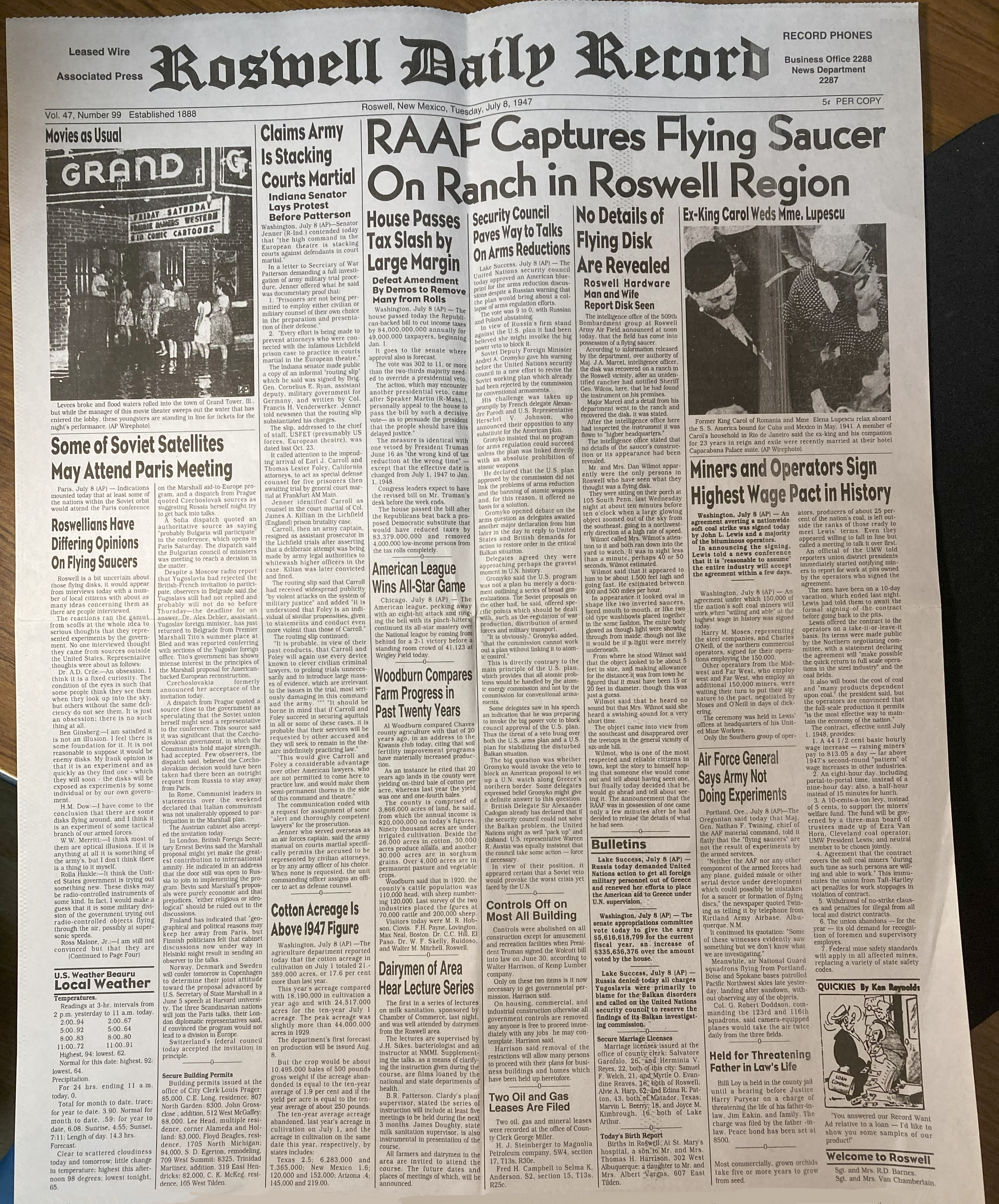
July 8, 1947, issue of the Roswell Daily Record, featured a story announcing the Roswell Army Air Field "capture" of a "flying saucer" from a ranch near Roswell.

== Biography ==
Walter Haut was born in Chicago, Illinois, on June 3, 1922. During World War II, he was a bombardier flying 35 missions against Japan. At Operation Crossroads, the A-bomb tests at the Bikini Atoll in the summer of 1946, he dropped instrument packages to record data from the bomb blasts. In 1947, he became the public information officer for the 509th Atomic Bomb Group at Roswell Army Air Field in New Mexico. The base commander, Colonel William H. Blanchard, was a close personal friend.

In 1991, Haut and two other men founded the International UFO Museum and Research Center in Roswell, New Mexico, where he presided as president until 1996. Haut died on December 15, 2005, at the age of eighty-three.

== Haut and the Roswell UFO incident ==
In the first book on the subject, The Roswell Incident, Haut was said to be "not a witness." He told interviewers in 1979 that base commander Colonel William Blanchard asked him to write and distribute the press release, but when Haut asked to see the object in question, he was told "his request was impossible."

In UFO Crash at Roswell, Haut appears as a witness, though not to any of actual debris. During a March 1989 interview he said he knew "nothing" about what was recovered. He described being asked by Blanchard to write the press release. "I didn't hear about it until, I guess, Jess [Jesse Marcel, head intelligence officer, who initially investigated and recovered some of the debris] was on his way to the flightline." He did, however, describe what Marcel told him: "It was something he had never seen and didn't believe it was of this planet. I trusted him on his knowledge." He further stated: "I think there was a giant cover-up on this thing."

In an affidavit signed May 14, 1993, he repeated the above claimed sequence of events and added "I believe Col. Blanchard saw the material, because he sounded positive about what the material was. There is no chance he would have mistaken it for a weather balloon. Neither is there any chance that Major Marcel would have been mistaken." By this time, Haut, along with Max Littell and Glenn Dennis, had opened the International UFO Museum and Research Center.

Prior to Haut's death, ufologist Donald R. Schmitt conducted interviews with Haut covering material that Schmitt says Haut requested to be kept confidential during his life. Schmitt composed and emailed an "affidavit" to Haut's family, which Haut signed at his International UFO Museum and Research Center in front of daughter Julie Shuster, staff notary Beverlee Morgan, and a museum guest. Schmitt and the family agreed not to release this 2002 document until after Haut's death. Haut died in 2005; in 2007, Donald Schmitt and Tom Carey published the book Witness to Roswell, which prominently featured the document, presented as the "Sealed Affidavit of Walter G. Haut". The book was criticized for a lack of evidence, inconsistencies with previous accounts, and presenting the 2002 document as Haut's affidavit.

== See also ==
- Roswell Incident
- UFO

== Notes ==
=== Bibliography ===
- Associated Press: "Lt. Walter Haut, spokesman who announced wreckage of flying saucer in Roswell, died at 83". Santa Fe New Mexican. Associated Press. December 18, 2005. Archived from the original on September 1, 2006.
- Barrett, William P. (July 10, 2007). "Those Roswell Aliens Dropped In Everywhere". Forbes.
- Berlitz, Charles; Moore, William (1980). The Roswell Incident. New York: Grosset & Dunlap. ISBN 978-0448211992.
- Carey, Thomas J.; Schmitt, Donald (2007). Witness to Roswell: Unmasking the 60-Year Cover-Up. Franklin Lakes, N.J: New Page Books. ISBN 978-1564149435.
- Carey, Thomas J.; Schmitt, Donald R. (July 22, 2007). "Thomas J. Carey and Donald R. Schmitt". The Paracast (Interview). Interviewed by Steinberg, Gene; Biedny, David.
- Clarke, David (2 July 2008). "Making UFOlogy History: Roswell, and the story of Betty and Barney Hill". The Skeptic. Vol. 21, no. 3.
- Pflock, Karl (2001). Roswell: Inconvenient Facts and the Will to Believe. Amherst, New York: Prometheus Books. ISBN 978-1573928946.
- Randle, Kevin D.; Schmitt, Donald R. (1991). UFO Crash at Roswell. New York: Avon Books. ISBN 978-0-380-76196-8.
- Shuster, Julie (September 2007). "Haut's Daughter tells how affidavit came to be" (PDF). MUFON UFO Journal. No. 473. Mutual UFO Network. Archived from the original (PDF) on 2011-01-11 – via The Black Vault.
- Thomas, Dave (2009). "Roswell update: fading star?" (PDF). Skeptical Inquirer. Vol. 33, no. 1.
