= Thomas DuBose =

United States Air Force general

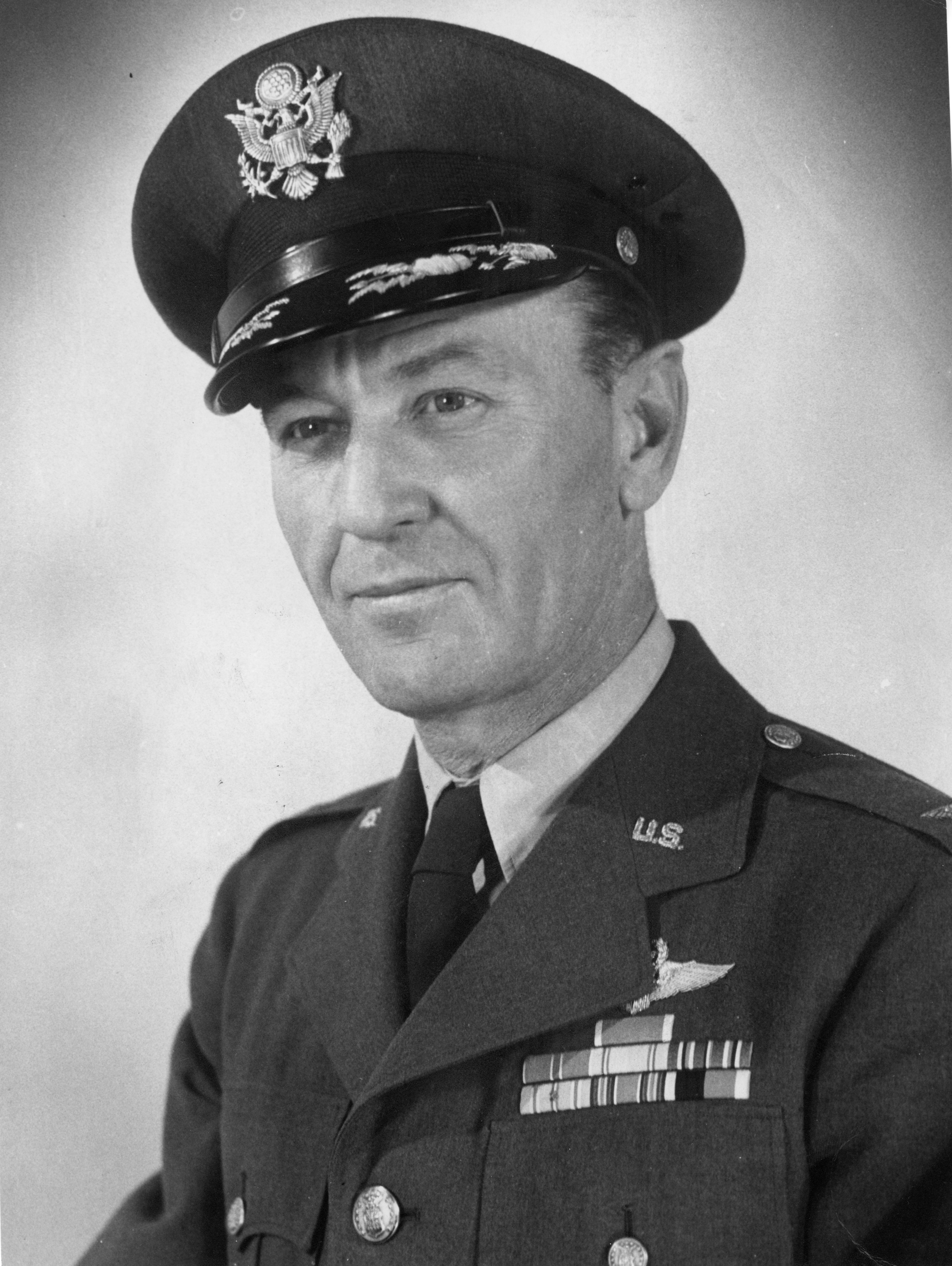
- Born: Thomas Jefferson DuBose; May 10, 1902; San Antonio, Texas, US
- Died: February 24, 1992 (aged 89); Winter Park, Florida
- Military career
- Allegiance: United States
- Branch: United States Army; United States Air Force
- Service years: 1929–1959
- Rank: Brigadier General
- Units: 3rd Pursuit Squadron; Pacific Air Command; Strategic Air Command; 8th Air Force
- Commands: 316th Air Division; Air Rescue Service
- Conflicts: World War II; Korean War
- Awards: Legion of Merit; Bronze Star

Thomas Jefferson DuBose (May 10, 1902 – February 24, 1992) was a brigadier general in the United States Air Force who served as chief of staff of the 8th Air Force. A veteran of World War II and the Korean War, Dubose was awarded the Legion of Merit and the Bronze Star.

== Early life and career ==
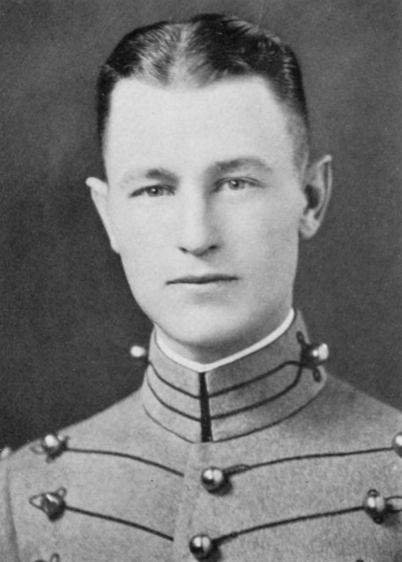
As a West Point cadet

DuBose was born on May 10, 1902 in San Antonio, Texas. In 1922, he graduated Central High School in Oklahoma City, DuBose attended the University of Oklahoma from 1923 until 1924. He enrolled at the United States Military Academy, graduating on June 13, 1929.

Upon receiving his commission as a second lieutenant in the Army, in September 1929, DuBose attended primary flying school at March Field, Calif. He graduated from the Advanced Flying School at Kelly Field, Texas and was transferred to the Army Air Corps on March 14, 1931. He remained at Kelly Field until June, serving as a flight instructor. In the summer of 1931, DuBose joined the 3rd Pursuit Squadron in the Philippines.

== World War II ==
In 1940, Dubose, now a captain, became director of training at Moffett Field, California, and was promoted to major. He was later promoted to lieutenant colonel and made director of training. The following year he was promoted to colonel and appointed "chief of Flying Training Section" at the Headquarters of the U.S. Army Air Forces. In December 1944, he took command of the 316th Bomb Wing at Colorado Springs, Colorado. In July 1945, the wing deployed to the Asia-Pacific theater. On September 2, 1945, the Empire of Japan formally surrendered, ending the Second World War. Afterwards, DuBose was appointed assistant chief of staff for plans of the Pacific Air Command stationed in Manila.

== Later career ==
In June 1946, DuBose became deputy assistant chief of staff for operations of Strategic Air Command at Bolling Field, Washington, D.C. From August to October 1946 he commanded the advance headquarters echelon of Strategic Air Command at Colorado Springs. He served as assistant chief of staff for personnel, chief of staff and deputy commander of the 8th Air Force at Fort Worth.

In February 1948, Du Bose became deputy commander of Air Task Group 7.4, the Air Force part of Joint Task Force 7, a unit that "constructed a proving ground for the Atomic Energy Commission at Eniwetok and later assisted the Atomic Energy Commission in the conduct of the first series of tests of atomic weapons." He subsequently entered the National War College, graduating the following June. In August 1949, DuBose assumed command of the 1602nd Air Transport Wing at Wiesbaden, Germany. On August 13, 1952, DuBose took command of Air Rescue Service, and on Aug. 17 he was promoted to the rank of brigadier general. He retired from the Air Force in 1959 and resided in Winter Park, Florida.

DuBose was chief of staff to Brigadier General Roger M. Ramey, who was responsible for reversing the Army Air Force's stance on the nature of the crashed craft during the 1947 Roswell UFO incident. In a later interview, DuBose stated that Ramey's explanation that the crashed craft was actually a weather balloon was only a "cover story".

== Personal life ==
In June 1958, DuBose and his wife Rose celebrated the birth of a daughter. The couple also had a son. DuBose was a member of First United Methodist Church.

DuBose died on February 24, 1992, at the age of 89.
