= Stanton T. Friedman =

American ufologist (1934–2019)

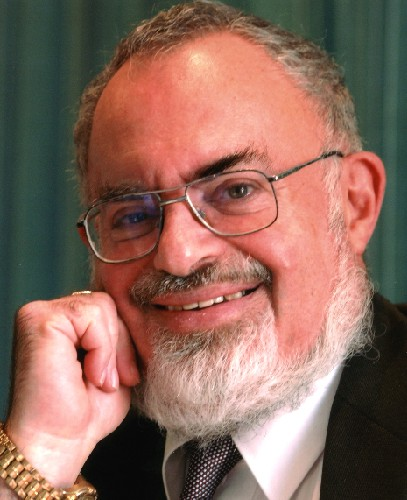
- Born: July 29, 1934; Elizabeth, New Jersey, U.S.
- Died: May 13, 2019 (aged 84); Toronto, Ontario, Canada
- Education: Rutgers University; University of Chicago (BS, MS)
- Occupations: Ufologist, physicist
- Known for: Roswell UFO incident

Stanton Terry Friedman (July 29, 1934 – May 13, 2019) was an American–Canadian nuclear physicist and professional ufologist who was based in Fredericton, New Brunswick, Canada.

== Early life ==
Born in Elizabeth, New Jersey, Friedman was raised in nearby Linden and graduated from Linden High School in 1951; he attended Rutgers University and then transferred to the University of Chicago, earning a Bachelor of Science in 1955 and a master's degree in nuclear physics in 1956.

=== Career in nuclear physics ===
Friedman was employed for 14 years as a nuclear physicist for such companies as General Electric (1956–1959), Aerojet General Nucleonics (1959–1963), General Motors (1963–1966), Westinghouse (1966–1968), TRW Systems (1969–1970), and McDonnell Douglas, where he worked on advanced, classified programs on nuclear aircraft, fission and fusion rockets, and compact nuclear power plants for space applications. Since the 1980s, he consulted for the radon-detection industry. Friedman's professional affiliations included the American Nuclear Society, the American Physical Society, the American Institute of Aeronautics and Astronautics, and AFTRA.

=== UFO investigations and advocacy ===
In 1970, Friedman left full-time employment as a physicist to pursue the scientific investigation of unidentified flying objects (UFOs). Since then, he gave lectures at more than 600 colleges and to more than 100 professional groups in 50 states, 10 provinces, and 19 countries outside the US. Additionally, he worked as a consultant on the topic. He published more than 80 UFO-related papers and appeared on many radio and television programs. He also provided written testimony to Congressional hearings and appeared twice at the United Nations.

Friedman consistently favored use of the term "flying saucer" in his work, saying "Flying saucers are, by definition, unidentified flying objects, but very few unidentified flying objects are flying saucers. I am interested in the latter, not the former." He used to refer to himself as "The Flying Saucer Physicist", because of his degrees in nuclear physics and work on nuclear projects.

== Friedman's positions regarding UFO phenomena ==
Friedman was the first civilian to document the site of the Roswell UFO incident, and supported the hypothesis that it was a genuine crash of an extraterrestrial spacecraft. In 1968 Friedman told a committee of the United States House of Representatives that the evidence suggests that Earth is being visited by intelligently controlled extraterrestrial vehicles. Friedman also stated he believed that UFO sightings were consistent with magnetohydrodynamic propulsion.

In 1996, after researching and fact checking the Majestic 12 documents, Friedman said that there was no substantive grounds for dismissing their authenticity.

In 2004, on George Noory's Coast to Coast radio show, Friedman debated Seth Shostak, the SETI Institute's Senior Astronomer. Like Friedman, Shostak also believes in the existence of intelligent life other than humans; however, unlike Friedman, he does not believe such life is now on Earth or is related to UFO sightings.

Friedman hypothesized that UFOs may originate from relatively nearby sunlike stars.(p. 217)

A piece of evidence that he often cited with respect to this hypothesis is the 1964 star map drawn by alleged alien abductee Betty Hill during a hypnosis session, which she said was shown to her during her abduction. Astronomer Marjorie Fish constructed a three-dimensional map of nearby sun-like stars and claimed a good match from the perspective of Zeta Reticuli, about 39 light-years distant. The fit of the Hill/Fish star maps was hotly debated in the December 1974 edition of Astronomy magazine, with Friedman and others defending the statistical validity of the match.

=== SETI ===
Friedman stated strong views against search for extraterrestrial intelligence (SETI) research. Friedman contested the implicit premise of SETI that there has been no extraterrestrial visitation of the planet, because it was his claim that SETI was seeking only signals, not extraterrestrial intelligence or beings. He maintained that the prominence and widespread public claims of those involved with SETI have tended to prevent serious research of UFOs, including research by journalists.(p. 129)

Friedman was a classmate of Carl Sagan at the University of Chicago. Friedman criticized Sagan, a proponent of SETI, for ignoring empirical evidence, such as "600-plus unknowns" of Project Blue Book Special Report No. 14. Friedman argued that these empirical data directly contradict Sagan's claim in Other Worlds that the "reliable cases are uninteresting and the interesting cases are unreliable". Specifically, Friedman referred to a table in Project Blue Book Special Report No. 14 that he said "shows that the better the quality of the sighting, the more likely it was to be an 'unknown', and the less likely it was to be listed as containing 'insufficient information'"(p. 42).

=== Public and scientific opinion ===
Friedman said of the response to his talks, "I know that most people are unfamiliar with the several large-scale scientific studies ... because I ask, after I show a slide and ask about each one, 'How many here have read this?' Typically, it is only one or two percent". He said that a talk he gave to Canadian journalists in Saint John, New Brunswick, caused the attitudes of the journalists to change, because "... attendees had had no idea there was so much solid information, as opposed to the tabloid nonsense they thought was the primary source of UFO data". (p. 202)

Friedman argued that the majority of people believe UFOs exist and at least some groups of scientists do as well. Friedman (2008) referred to the following data in support of his position:

- Gallup Polls between 1966 and 1987 asked respondents the question: "Are UFOs something real, or just people's imagination?" Of those who took a position one way or the other, 61%, 64%, 68%, and 60% took the position they are real in 1966, 1977, 1978, and 1987, respectively.
- With respect to scientists, a poll was taken by Industrial Research and Development in 1971 and 1979. Of the respondents who took a position, 64% and 69% stated they believed UFOs either probably or definitely exist. Of this subgroup, 32% and 44% considered their origin to be Outer Space in 1971 and 1979, respectively. Of the rest of this subgroup, approximately half believed them to be natural phenomena and half were "undecided".
- Peter Sturrock also polled the membership of the American Astronomical Society and found that "the greater the amount of time one spent on reading UFO-related material, the more likely one is to accept their reality" (p. 210).

== Criticisms and controversies ==
Friedman was outspoken in his articulation of positions and in his criticism of UFO debunkers, often stating he was not an "apologist ufologist". His positions are regarded as controversial in mainstream science and media, but Friedman claimed to have received little opposition at his many lectures, most of which were at colleges and universities, many to engineering societies and other groups of physicists (p. 24). He had a number of debates in the mainstream media, including one with UFO skeptic Michael Shermer on CNN.

Friedman was criticized both by skeptics and other Roswell researchers for taking the position that there are no substantive grounds for dismissing the authenticity of some Majestic 12 documents although Friedman was the first to provide evidence that some of the documents are clearly hoaxes. For example, he showed that a supposed memo from Admiral Roscoe Hillenkoetter to President Truman, dated February 17, 1948, was actually the emulation of a letter from Marshall to Roosevelt that was featured in the book The American MAGIC. Friedman researched the MJ-12 documents since first becoming aware of them from William Moore and Jaime Shandera in 1984. He addressed criticisms of the original documents in both sources. As an example, Philip J. Klass claimed lexicographic inconsistencies based on the use of Pica typeface in the Cutler-Twining memo and offered $100, in a challenge to Friedman, for each legitimate example of the use of the same style and size Pica type as used in the memo. Friedman provided 14 examples and was paid $1000 by Klass.

== Personal life ==
Friedman was Ashkenazi Jewish. He was married twice. His first wife was Susie Virginia Porter, with whom he adopted three children, but they divorced in April 1974. He had one daughter with his second wife, Stella Marilyn Kimball. Friedman relocated to Marilyn's native Fredericton, New Brunswick in the early 1980s. Friedman donated his records to the Provincial Archives of New Brunswick in the months leading up to his death.

On May 13, 2019, Friedman died of a heart attack at the Toronto Pearson Airport while traveling home from a speaking engagement in Columbus, Ohio.

== Media ==
=== Books ===
- Flying Saucers & Science, June 2008, 320P.
- Captured! The Betty and Barney Hill UFO Experience. Co-author Kathleen Marden. Career Press / New Page Books, 2007. ISBN 978-1564149718, 978-1569247419
- Top Secret/MAJIC, Marlowe & Co. 1997. 272 pages, ISBN 978-1569247419
- Crash at Corona: The Definitive Story of The Roswell Incident. Co-author Don Berliner, 1997. ISBN 978-1931044899
- Science was Wrong: Startling truths about cures, theories, and inventions "They" declared impossible. Co-author Kathleen Marden. Pompton Plains, NJ: New Page Books. 2010.
- Fact, Fiction, and Flying Saucers. Co-author Kathleen Marden. Pompton Plains, NJ: New Page Books. 2016.

=== Visual media ===
- UFOs: Stanton Friedman's revelation – (video) An interview with Stanton Friedman.
- Flying Saucers Are Real – VHS (1996), Vol. 1 – 84 minutes, Vol. 2 – 75 minutes (159 minutes total). Filmed at Kennedy Space Center.
- UFO Secret MJ-12 – DVD (2006), 2 discs, 151 minutes. Stan Friedman's 2003 lecture at Aztec, New Mexico on Roswell and MJ-12.
- Recollections of Roswell – DVD, 105 minutes
- Are Flying Saucers Real? – VHS. Informal Debate. Middle Tennessee State University, January 2004. Includes Q & no As.
- UFOs Are Real – VHS (1979), 92 minutes
- Flying Saucers And Science - Science Was Wrong - IPC APEX EXPO, 2015

=== CDs ===
- UFOs: The Real Story (1996)
