= Societal effects of UFO belief =

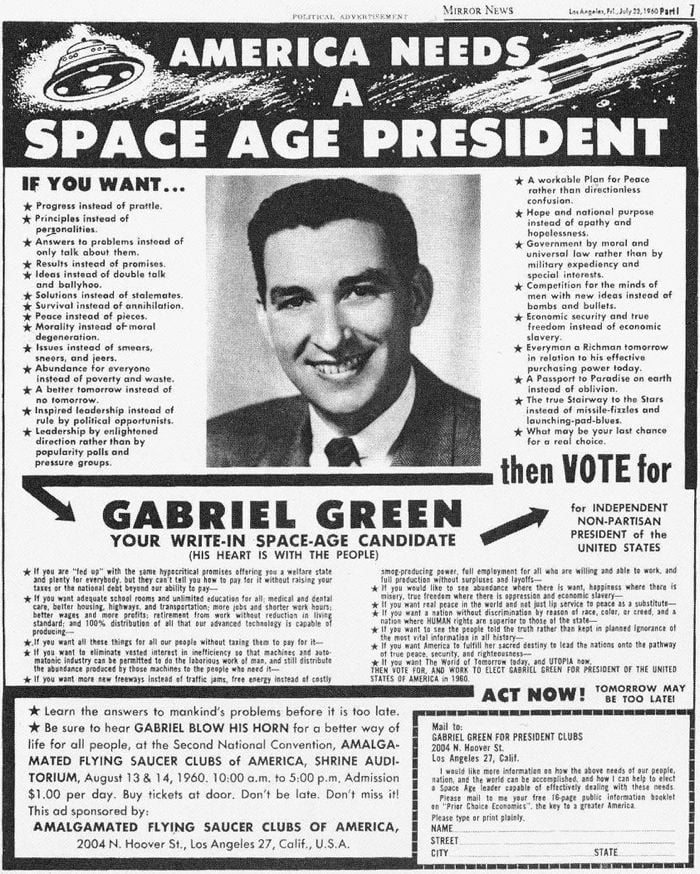
Newspaper advertisement for UFO contactee Gabriel Green's 1960 presidential campaign

UFOs have long influenced modern media, tourism, public trust, and science literacy. Film, television, and publishing helped create a subculture characterized by online communities, UFO conventions, parades, and tourism. Social media functions as a platform where proponents share news, rumors, and unverified footage, while a long-standing community of scientific skeptics analyze and debunk claims. Scholars note that while belief in UFOs and space aliens can provide positive community and spiritual outlets for some, the spread of conspiracy narratives also results in reduced trust in government institutions, challenges to public understanding of science, and negative consequences such as violence and suicides.

== Background ==
From the 1960s to 1990s, UFOs were part of American popular culture. In 1961, the first alien abduction account was sensationalized when Barney and Betty Hill underwent hypnosis after seeing a UFO and reported recovered memories of their experience. In 1966, 5% of Americans reported to Gallup that "they had at some time seen something they thought was a 'flying saucer'", 96% said "they had heard or read about flying saucers", and 46% of these "thought they were 'something real' rather than just people's imagination". Responding to UFO enthusiasm, there have always been consistent yet less popular efforts made at debunking many of the claims, and at times the media was enlisted including a 1966 TV special, "UFO: Friend, Foe or Fantasy?", in which Walter Cronkite "patiently" explained to viewers that UFOs were fantasy. Cronkite enlisted Carl Sagan and J. Allen Hynek, who told Cronkite, "To this time, there is no valid scientific proof that we have been visited by spaceships". Keith Kloor notes that the "allure of flying saucers" remained popular with the public into the 1970s, spurring production of such sci-fi films, as Close Encounters of the Third Kind and Alien, which "continued to stoke public fascination". Meanwhile, Leonard Nimoy narrated a popular occult and mystery TV series In Search of... while daytime talk shows of Mike Douglas, Merv Griffin, and Phil Donahue featured interviews with alien abductees and people who credulously reported stories about UFOs.

== Religious implications ==
According to astrobiologist Graham Lau, thinking about the possibility of extraterrestrial life can expand people's world view in profound and beneficial ways. Francesco Dimitri wrote that belief in UFOs can help satisfy human beings deep spiritual yearnings and help people make sense of the universe.

UFO religions hold the existence of extraterrestrial (ET) entities and communication with them as a core belief. Typically, adherents of such religions believe the ETs to be interested in the welfare of humanity which either already is, or eventually will become, part of a pre-existing ET civilization. These religions have their roots in the tropes of early science fiction (especially space opera) and weird fiction writings, in ufology, and in the subculture of UFO sightings and alien abduction stories. Some historians consider the Aetherius Society, founded by George King, to be the first UFO religion, while others consider it to be "I AM" Activity.

== Social media ==
Studies have argued that viewing paranormal-themed television-including documentary, reality, and news programming-can cultivate such beliefs, but research suggests that the online sharing may also serve as a source of beliefs.

== Conspiracy theories ==
UFO conspiracy theories are widespread in the United States. A 2019 Gallup poll found that 33% of Americans believed some UFOs were alien spacecraft, while 68% believed the U.S. government knows "more about UFOs than it is telling us". In 2020, a poll found 81% felt the government "knows more than its telling", though only 51% felt UFO "might be alien spaceships". The prevalence led Barrie Gunter, University of Leicester Professor of Media, to observe: "even though Ufology enthusiasts have often been dismissed as quacks, there is a silent plurality of people who believe that they might be on to something".

== Effect on public trust, understanding of science ==
Belief that evidence of aliens is being covered up encourages the spread of conspiracy theories, which could undermine trust in democratic institutions. Sensational publicity around UFOs and UAPs can also undermine legitimate science communication, such as the possibility of finding microbial extraterrestrial life. For example, astrobiology has much less effective publicity impact than UFOlogy. Television entertainment such as Ancient Aliens can have millions of subscribers while NASA's astrobiology channel has only thousands. Established science can often be overwhelmed by entertainment repackaged as factual. The history and mythology of indigenous people are often subsumed by alien visitation narratives. UFOlogists have sometimes combined genuine indigenous stories about life arriving from the skies with fictional tales about UFOs, and promoted them as suppressed history.

== Negative consequences ==
"Shared religious delusions described in the literature pose a high fatal risk in suicide pacts between family members. Here the similarity with the religious types of delusion is worrisome: the aliens replace God and a UFO or a mysterious planet replaces Heaven (a place of rest when one dies)."

— Adriana D. Neagoe
"Abducted by Aliens: A Case Study", Psychiatry

Though initially largely benign, UFO conspiracy theories began to incorporate politics in the 1980s, alleging that the US Government was in league with an evil alien race. By way of contrast with prior UFO conspiracy theories about benevolent 'space brothers', author Jerome Clark named this new strain of thinking "ufology's dark side".

- In 1955, Ufologist Morris K. Jessup authored The Case for the UFO. He was invited to the Office of Naval Research, where he was given a copy of his book with annotations, seemingly authored by conspiratorial aliens, that told an elaborate tale of the Philadelphia Experiment, where scientists supposedly teleported a destroyer to the Norfolk Naval Yard. Jessup became obsessed with investigating the incident. Amid marital separation, financial troubles, and poor health following a car accident, Jessup died of suicide in 1959. Jessup's source, Carl Meredith Allen, would later admit to authoring the annotations as part of a hoax targeting Jessup.
- In 1971, atmospheric physicist James E. McDonald, described by the New York Times as "the most outspoken scientific proponent of the possibility that unidentified flying objects might be under control from beyond the earth", attempted suicide, leaving himself partially blind. On June 13, 1971, McDonald was found dead with a head wound in a desert area of Tucson, Arizona, with a .38 caliber revolver and suicide note found nearby. His death was ruled a suicide. Psychologist Don C. Donderi notes that McDonald's suicide came after enduring public ridicule, his wife leaving him, and his home life collapsing, as his "UFO commitment increased".
- In 1996, Joseph Mazzachelli and John J. Ford, officers of the Long Island UFO Network, were arrested on suspicion of attempting to assassinate New York politicians by means of radiation poisoning. Mazzachelli and Ford believed the politicians were keeping secret knowledge of a crashed UFO. A co-conspirator, former U.S. Department of Defense employee and Northrop Grumman contractor Edward Zabo, was also arrested. Ford was judicially determined to be delusional and committed to a psychiatric hospital in lieu of trial. Mazzachelli and Zabo both pleaded guilty.
- In March 1997, 39 members of the UFO religion Heaven's Gate participated in a mass suicide in San Diego County, California. During the group's last years, they espoused an elaborate conspiracy theory that the government had colluded with a group of demonic aliens ("Luciferians") to hide the existence of UFOs in general, specifically a UFO that trailed the Hale-Bopp comet.
- In 1988, Milton William Cooper posted to an early message board about a UFO sighting he reported while in the Navy. He was invited to visit John Lear, where he was shown documents suggesting the US government was secretly collaborating with evil aliens. One source, Bill Moore, later admitted to using fake documents as part of a hoax targeting Paul Bennewitz and other UFO enthusiasts. Cooper cut ties with Lear and became obsessed with UFO and alien-government conspiracy claims. In 2001, Cooper died in a shootout with law enforcement at his home in Eagar, Arizona.
- In 2016, Kyle Odom shot Idaho pastor Tim Remington multiple times after claiming that Remington and other public figures were alien hybrids. He then traveled to Washington, D.C. and tossed USB drives containing writings about UFOs over the White House security fence. Remington survived, and Odom was sentenced to 25 years imprisonment.
