= Devil's Sea =

Site of reported paranormal activity

Coordinates: 25°N 137°E

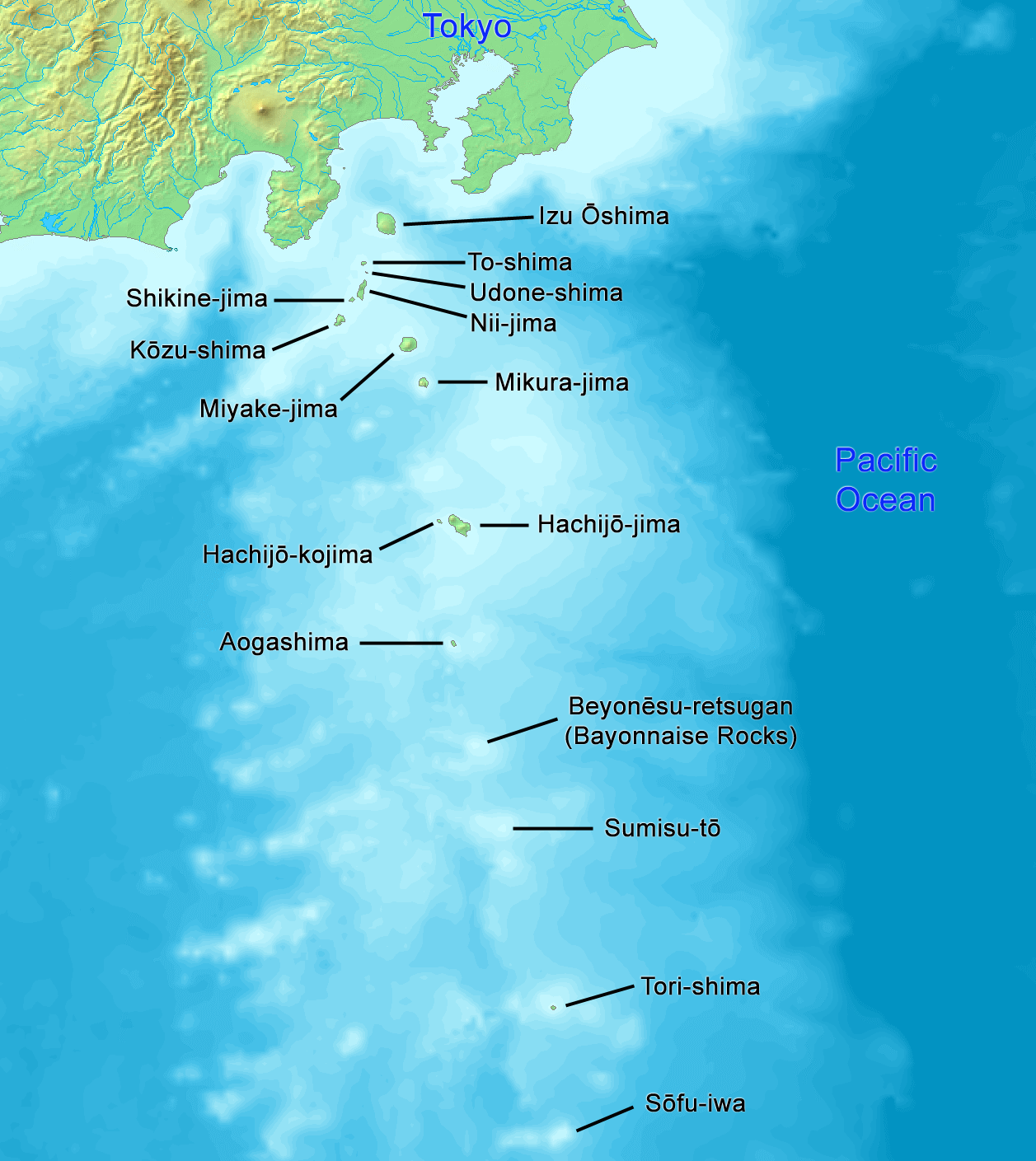
A map of the Izu Islands, the center of the Devil's Sea legend.

The Devil's Sea (Japanese: 魔の海, Hepburn: Ma no Umi), also known as the Devil's triangle, the Dragon's Triangle, the Formosa Triangle and the Pacific Bermuda Triangle, is a region of the Pacific, south of Tokyo. The Devil's Sea is sometimes considered a paranormal location, though the veracity of these claims has been questioned.

== Description ==
A possible form of the Dragon's Triangle. Due to the Berlitz's claim having many inconsistencies, its exact form is unclear.

The Japanese word ma no umi (translated as devil sea, troublesome sea, or dangerous sea) has been widely used to describe dangerous marine locations around the world. This means that there are many locations that the Japanese call ma no umi.

In August of 1945 a Mitsubishi A6M Zero supposedly went missing. A distress radio transmission from Zero F Wing Commander pilot Shiro Kawamoto crossing the Triangle near the end of the war created more questions than answers. The last thing his message said was "...something is happening in the sky...the sky is opening up-".

On 4 January 1955, Japanese ship Shinyo Maru No. 10 (第十伸洋丸) lost radio contact near Mikura-jima. Japanese newspapers then began to label the location as ma no umi until the ship was found safe on 15 January. Yomiuri Shimbun showed a map of the sea with points of several other ships that had been lost in recent years, and stated that those ships were lost within the area that the Yokohama Coast Guard Office had classified as a special danger area.

In the U.S., The New York Times introduced this incident with the term "The Devil's Sea," where nine ships had been lost in perfect weather. Yomiuri Shimbun described the size of the ma no umi as follows: "From the Izu islands to east of the Ogasawara islands; about 200 miles east to west, and about 300 miles north to south, where nine ships were lost in the past five years". However, two of the nine ships were lost near Miyake-jima and Iwo Jima, about 750 miles apart.

In 1974, American paranormal writer Charles Berlitz introduced the Devil's Sea in his book The Bermuda Triangle. Berlitz claimed that "nine modern ships and several hundred crews were lost without traces between 1950 and 1954; in 1955, the Japanese government sent Kaiyo Maru No 5 to the sea for investigating unexplained ship losses, but this ship vanished as well" ... "After the incident, Japanese authorities have labeled the sea as a danger zone."

In 1989, Berlitz claimed that the Devil's Sea is also called the Dragon's Triangle in his book The Dragon's Triangle. Berlitz continued by theorizing that five Japanese military vessels disappeared while on maneuvers near Japanese shores in early 1942.

== Criticisms ==
Yomiuri Shimbun described that this blue quadrangle was the ma-no umi where the coast guard classified as special danger area. The actual danger area was the red circle according to Kusche.

In 1975, American author Larry Kusche published The Bermuda Triangle Mystery Solved, debunking the Devil's Sea legend. Kusche sent letters to government offices which were related to the sea, but nobody knew about the Devil's Sea or such a danger area. The actual danger zone where the Maritime Safety Agency of Japan warned not to approach was only 10 miles to Myōjin-shō.

The Kaiyo Maru No. 5 was sent to Myōjin-shō for investigating activity of an undersea volcano, and lost in 1952. The loss of the Kaiyo Maru was accounted for: undersea volcano eruption. One of eight other lost ships also was accounted for. Most of the nine ships were small fishing boats with poor or no radio. The weather was not perfect.

In 1995, Kusche's research claimed that Berlitz's military vessels were actually fishing vessels, and some of those listed by Berlitz sank outside the area defined by the Dragon's Triangle. Kusche also wrote that the Japanese research vessel carried not 100 personnel, but only 31 and that an undersea volcano destroyed it on 24 September 1952.

In Daniel Cohen's 1974 book Curses, Hexes & Spells, it's reported that legends of the danger of the Dragon's Triangle go back for centuries in Japan. Its most famous casualty was the No. 5 Kaiyō-Maru, a scientific research vessel, which disappeared with the loss of all hands on 24 September 1952. With such a dramatic history, one would expect there to be all sorts of information on the subject, especially in Japan. A search completed by Skeptoid author Brian Dunning for books, newspaper, and magazine articles on the Dragon's Triangle came up completely empty, until a full 20 years after the loss of the Kaiyō-Maru. Apparently, the story (even the very existence of this legendary named region) was not invented until very recently.

Research also explores natural environmental changes, as the cause of such controversial anomalies in the Dragon's Triangle. One of these explanations is the vast field of methane hydrates present on the bottom of the ocean in the Dragon's Triangle area. Methane clathrates (methane hydrates gas) will "explode" when it rises above 18 °C (64 °F). Methane hydrate gases are described as icelike deposits that break off from the bottom and rise, forming bubbles on the surface of the water.

These gas eruptions can interrupt buoyancy and can easily sink a ship, leaving no trace of debris. Another explanation for this "paranormal" activity could be the undersea volcanoes that are very common in this area. It is quite characteristic for small islands in the Dragon's Triangle to frequently disappear and new islands appear due to both volcanoes and seismic activity. Because the location of the Dragon's Triangle is not plotted on any official world map, the area and perimeter vary from one author to another author.
