= The Roswell Incident (1980 book) =

- Author: Charles Berlitz and William Moore
- Language: English
- Subject: Roswell incident
- Published: October 1980
- Publisher: Grosset & Dunlap
- Publication place: US
- Media type: Hardcover
- Pages: 168
- ISBN: 9780448211992
- OCLC: 6831957
- Website: The Roswell Incident at the Internet Archive

The Roswell Incident is a 1980 book by Charles Berlitz and William Moore. The book helped to popularize stories of unusual debris recovered in 1947 by personnel of the Roswell Army Air Field.

== Background ==
=== Events of 1947 ===
The Roswell incident took place amid the flying disc craze of 1947, sparked by widespread media coverage of pilot Kenneth Arnold's alleged sighting. Amid hundreds of reports nationwide, on July 8, 1947, Roswell Army Air Field's press release was broadcast via wire transmission. The Army quickly retracted the statement, stating the crashed object was a conventional weather balloon.

=== Roswell revisited ===
The Roswell story gained significant attention in 1978 when retired lieutenant colonel Jesse Marcel, in an interview with ufologist Stanton Friedman, said he believed the debris he retrieved was of extraterrestrial origin.

== Authors ==
In 1974, Berlitz had authored The Bermuda Triangle, a best-seller which popularized the belief of the Bermuda Triangle as an area of ocean prone to disappearing ships and airplanes, perhaps associated with 'the lost continent of Atlantis'. The book sold nearly 20 million copies in 30 languages.

In 1979, Berlitz partnered with UFO researcher William L. Moore to publish The Philadelphia Experiment: Project Invisibility, which popularized the tale of a Navy invisibility experiment. The book expanded on stories of bizarre happenings, lost unified field theories by Albert Einstein, and government coverups.

== Contents ==
The book argues that an extraterrestrial craft was flying over the New Mexico desert to observe nuclear weapons activity when a lightning strike killed the alien crew and, that after discovering the crash, the US government engaged in a cover-up.

The Roswell Incident featured accounts of debris described by Marcel as "nothing made on this earth." Additional accounts by Bill Brazel, son of rancher Mac Brazel, neighbor Floyd Proctor and Walt Whitman Jr., son of newsman W. E. Whitman who had interviewed Mac Brazel, suggested the material Marcel recovered had super-strength not associated with a weather balloon. Anthropologist Charles Zeigler described the 1980 book as "version 1" of the Roswell myth. Berlitz and Moore's narrative was dominant until the late 1980s when other authors, attracted by the commercial potential of writing about Roswell, started producing rival accounts.

The book introduced the contention that debris which was recovered by Marcel at the Foster ranch, visible in photographs showing Marcel posing with the debris, was substituted for debris from a weather device as part of a cover-up. The book also claimed that the debris recovered from the ranch was not permitted a close inspection by the press. The efforts by the military were described as being intended to discredit and "counteract the growing hysteria towards flying saucers".

The authors claimed to have interviewed over 90 witnesses, though the testimony of only 25 appears in the book. Only seven of these people claimed to have seen the debris. Of these, five claimed to have handled it. Two accounts of witness intimidation were included in the book, including the incarceration of Mac Brazel.

This version of the myth began the elevation of Marcel's narrative above that of Cavitt, who gathered material from the site alongside Brazel and Marcel. Cavitt's mundane description of the debris contradicted Marcel and was likely omitted as not supporting UFO-community beliefs. Later authors would selectively quote Cavitt's assertion that the debris was not a German rocket or Japanese balloon bomb. Independent researchers would find patterns of embellishment in Jesse Marcel's accounts, including provably false statements about his military career and educational background.

=== Alien bodies ===
In 1947, officers from Roswell Army Air Field investigated a debris field near Corona. By the 1980s, popular accounts conflated the debris investigation with two separate myths of humanoid bodies over 300 miles away from Roswell.

The Roswell Incident was the first book to introduce the controversial second-hand stories of civil engineer Grady "Barney" Barnett and a group of archaeology students from an unidentified university encountering wreckage and "alien bodies" while on the Plains of San Agustin before being escorted away by the Army. The second-hand Barnett stories, set 150 miles to the west of Corona, were described by ufologists as the "one aspect of the account that seemed to conflict with the basic story about the retrieval of highly unusual debris from a sheep ranch outside Corona, New Mexico, in July 1947".

Many alleged first-hand accounts of the Roswell incident actually contain information from the Aztec, New Mexico, UFO incident, a hoaxed flying saucer crash which gained national notoriety after being promoted by journalist Frank Scully in his articles and a 1950 book Behind the Flying Saucers.

== Reception ==
Donovan wrote that critics have deemed The Roswell Incident "a collection of wild hearsay" offering "second - and third-hand accounts Berlitz and Moore then use for fantastic speculation and to jump to a lot of unwarranted conclusions", and that when critics and skeptics characterized the Majestic 12 documents as fraudulent, "The accusing fingers were pointing at Moore."

The book "did not make the commercial impact its authors hoped."

== Aftermath ==
At a 1989 MUFON conference, Moore claimed that he had been engaged in "disinformation" activities against Paul Bennewitz on behalf of the Air Force Office of Special Investigations.

== Modern views ==
In 1993, in response to an inquiry from US congressman Steven Schiff of New Mexico, the General Accounting Office launched an inquiry and directed the Office of the United States Secretary of the Air Force to conduct an internal investigation. A 1994 Air Force report concluded that the material recovered in 1947 was likely debris from Project Mogul, a military surveillance program employing high-altitude balloons (and classified portion of an unclassified New York University project by atmospheric researchers).
