= HMS Juno (1844) =

Frigate of the Royal Navy

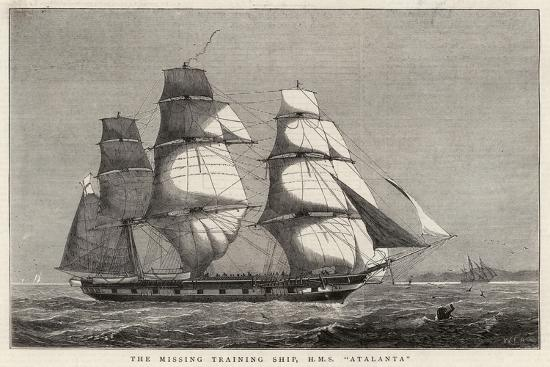
- HMS Atalanta in 1880

History

United Kingdom
- Name: Juno
- Namesake: Juno
- Ordered: 20 February 1837
- Builder: Pembroke Dockyard
- Laid down: April 1842
- Launched: 1 July 1844
- Completed: By 30 October 1845
- Renamed: Mariner, 10 January 1878; Atalanta, 22 January 1878
- Reclassified: Water police ship in 1862
- Fate: Lost, presumed foundered in the Atlantic between 12 and 16 February 1880

General characteristics
- Class & type: 26-gun Spartan-class sixth-rate frigate (later "corvette")
- Tons burthen: 923 1/94 bm
- Length: 131 ft (40 m) (overall); 107 ft (33 m) (keel)
- Beam: 40 ft 3.25 in (12.2746 m)
- Depth of hold: 10 ft 9 in (3.28 m)
- Sail plan: Full-rigged ship
- Complement: 240
- Armament: Upper deck: 18 × 32-pounders; Quarterdeck: 6 × 32-pounder gunnades; Forecastle: 2 × 32-pounder gunnades

HMS Juno was a 26-gun Spartan-class sixth-rate frigate of the Royal Navy launched in 1844 at Pembroke. As HMS Juno, she carried out the historic role in 1857 of annexing the Cocos (Keeling) Islands to the British Empire. She was renamed HMS Mariner in January 1878 and then HMS Atalanta two weeks later.

== Disappearance ==
Atalanta was serving as a training ship when in 1880 she disappeared with her entire crew after setting sail from the Royal Naval Dockyard in Bermuda for Falmouth, England on 31 January 1880. It was presumed that she sank in a powerful storm which crossed her route a couple of weeks after she sailed. The search for evidence of her fate attracted worldwide attention, and the Admiralty received more than 150 telegrams and 200 personal calls from anxious friends and relatives after it was announced that the ship was missing, and possibly lost.

Investigation of the ship's loss was rendered difficult by the lack of any survivors, but one former member of her crew, Able Seaman John Varling, testified that he had found her "exceedingly crank, as being overweight, She rolled 32 degrees and Captain Stirling is reported as having been heard to remark that had she rolled one degree more she must have gone over and foundered. The young sailors were either too timid to go aloft or were incapacitated by sea sickness... Varling states that they hid themselves away, and could not be found when wanted by the boatswain's mate."

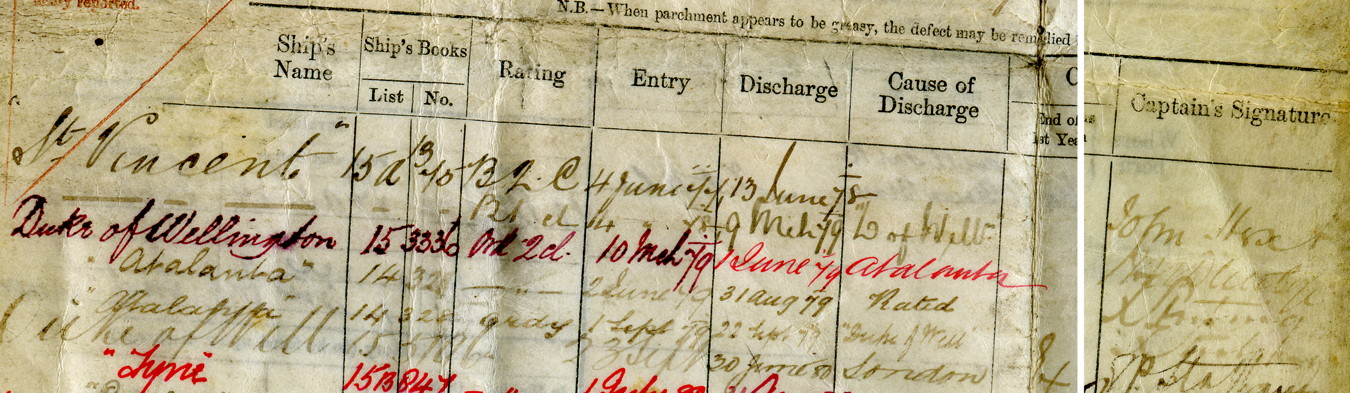
A Royal Navy service record from the last completed training mission before Atalanta's loss

The exact circumstances of the ship's loss remain uncertain, but the gunboat Avon – which arrived at Portsmouth on 19 April from the Chile station – reported "that at the Azores she noticed immense quantities of wreckage floating about... in fact the sea was strewn with spars etc." Two days later, amid mounting concern that the loss of the ship might have been prevented had her crew not been so inexperienced, The Times editorialised: "There can be no question of the criminal folly of sending some 300 lads who have never been to sea before in a training ship without a sufficient number of trained an experienced seamen to take charge of her in exceptional circumstances. The ship's company of the Atalanta numbered only about 11 able seamen, and when we consider that young lads are often afraid to go aloft in a gale to take down sail... a special danger attaching to the Atalanta becomes apparent." A sunken wreck, with just the bow above water, was sighted at 46°42′N 7°45′W on 14 September by the German brig W. von Freeden. It was thought that this could have been the wreck of Atalanta.

A memorial in St Ann's Church, Portsmouth, names a total of 281 fatalities in the disaster. Among those lost was Philip Fisher, a lieutenant who had enlisted the indirect support of Queen Victoria to obtain an appointment to the ship. He was the younger brother of the future Admiral of the Fleet Lord Jacky Fisher.

Since the 1960s, the loss of HMS Atalanta has often been cited as evidence of the purported Bermuda Triangle, an allegation shown to be nonsense by the research of author David Francis Raine in 1997.

== See also ==
- List of people who disappeared mysteriously at sea
