= Atlantis: The Lost Continent Revealed =

Pseudohistorical book by Charles Berlitz

- Cover of first British edition
- Author: Charles Berlitz
- Subject: Atlantis
- Genre: Pseudohistory
- Publisher: Macmillan
- Publication date: 1984
- ISBN: 978-0-333-37849-6

Atlantis: The Lost Continent Revealed is a pseudohistorical book by Charles Berlitz. He lists several alternative theories on where the possible mythical Atlantis may have been situated, and cites different legends and stories that may support the different theories. All areas and theories are covered starting with Plato, Crete (Thera), Azores and Edgar Cayce's involvement in the story.

Berlitz, author of many popular books on the paranormal and unexplained phenomena, researched Atlantis and wrote a 1969 book titled The Mystery of Atlantis. Berlitz not only became convinced that Atlantis was real but also that it was the source of the Bermuda Triangle mystery, a subject he explored in his 1974 best-seller The Bermuda Triangle. Illustrated in the book he strongly believed extraterrestrials were in some way involved in Atlantis and the Bermuda Triangle. His ideas have been described as pseudoscientific. Berlitz's wild ideas about the Bermuda Triangle — and, by extension, Atlantis — were definitively debunked the following year by researcher Larry Kusche, author of 1975 The Bermuda Triangle Mystery — Solved.

In 1984, Berlitz wrote Atlantis: The Lost Continent Revealed to counter his shot down ideas from critics.

== Theories ==
=== Nuclear disaster ===
According to skeptical researcher [Guy P. Harrison] who has criticized Berlitz's statements about Atlantis as nonsensical: "Charles Berlitz, the same writer who stirred up belief in the Bermuda Triangle, also wrote Atlantis: The Lost Continent Revealed. Berlitz goes so far as to promote the belief that the people of Atlantis possessed nuclear weapons many thousands of years ago and it was a large scale nuclear war that destroyed their culture!"

=== Natural causes ===
"Berlitz believed that the Azores held the key to the Atlantis puzzle and wrote ‘Volcanic activity is constantly occurring in the Azores area, where there are still active volcanoes… The islands of Corvo and Flores in the Azores, which have been mapped since 1351, have constantly changed their shape, with large parts of Corvo having disappeared into the sea.’

- In this theory he presumed Atlantis was in the middle of the North Atlantic Ocean, and due to natural causes slowly sunk through the years.

=== Magical submergence ===
In his last theory, Berlitz claimed the scenario presented by Plato was essentially correct. Although most of his evidence was thought provoking, his evidence was slim to non-existent. Here a diver had supposedly located a massive submerged pyramid near the Bahamas, but would not reveal the coordinates. "An island supposedly emerged from the Atlantic Ocean in 1882, complete with bronze artefacts, but was never found again, and the log of the ship which discovered it was destroyed in the London blitz in 1940". He was presumably referring to the Cuicuilco pyramid, discovered by Byron Cummings of the University of Arizona in 1922.He strongly believed that Atlantis was located in the Bermuda Triangle due to the strange magnetic pulls that scrambled communications and made ships lost.

- On this account he claims Atlantis is located somewhere in the Bermuda Triangle, and would be located between 1968 and 1969, as Edgar Cayce had predicted before his death in 1945.

== Debunking Charles Berlitz ==
=== Kusche ===
Researcher Larry Kusche, who published The Bermuda Triangle Mystery: Solved in 1975, argued that Berlitz and other authors had exaggerated their claims and had not done any proper research. They presented some disappearance cases as "mysteries" when they were not mysteries at all, and some reported cases had not even happened within the Bermuda Triangle.

After extensively researching the issue, Kusche concluded that the number of disappearances that occurred within the Bermuda Triangle was not actually greater than in any other similarly trafficked area of the ocean, and that other writers presented misinformation—such as not reporting storms that occurred on the same day as disappearances, and sometimes even making it seem as though the conditions had been calm for the purposes of creating a sensational story. In short: previous Bermuda Triangle authors did not do their research and either knowingly or unintentionally "made it up".

The book did such a thorough job of debunking the myth that it effectively ended most of the Bermuda Triangle hype. When authors like Berlitz and others were unable to refute Kusche's findings, even the most steadfast of believers had difficulty remaining confident in the sensationalized Bermuda Triangle narrative. Nevertheless, many magazine articles, TV shows, and movies have continued to feature the Bermuda Triangle.

== See also ==
- Atlantida
