= Bill Moore (ufologist) =

American UFO researcher (born 1943)

- Born: October 31, 1943 (age 83)
- Education: Thiel College, Greenville, Pennsylvania
- Occupation: Author
- Known for: UFOlogy and UFO conspiracy theories including Majestic 12

William Leonard Moore (born October 31, 1943) is an American author and UFO researcher, prominent from the late 1970s to the late 1980s. He co-authored two books with Charles Berlitz, including The Roswell Incident.

== Career ==
Interested in UFOs since he was a teenager, Moore attended Thiel College, located in Greenville, Pennsylvania graduating in 1965. He taught language and humanities at various high schools. He became Arizona state section director of the Mutual UFO Network and left teaching to pursue a career as a freelance writer.

Moore wrote The Philadelphia Experiment - Project Invisibility with Charles Berlitz in 1979, about an alleged naval military experiment popularly known as the Philadelphia Experiment aboard the USS Eldridge in 1943.

In 1980, Moore wrote The Roswell Incident with writing partner Charles Berlitz, which alleged the Roswell UFO incident had involved the crash of an extraterrestrial space ship.

In May 1987, Moore along with ufologists Jaime Shandera and Stanton Friedman circulated the Majestic 12 documents that purported the existence of a high-level policy making group overseeing UFOs and extraterrestrials. All individuals who received the fake documents were connected to Bill Moore. The FBI denounced the documents as "bogus". Scientific skeptic author Brian Dunning investigated the history of the subject, and reported his findings in the 2016 Skeptoid podcast episode "The Secret History of Majestic 12". He cited Bill Moore's argument that the papers were actually part of a disinformation campaign of the US government meant to deflect attention from secret Air Force projects.

At a 1989 MUFON conference, Moore publicly announced that he had been engaged in "disinformation" activities against Paul Bennewitz on behalf of the Air Force Office of Special Investigations. Mark Pilkington writes in his 2010 book Mirage Men about Moore's relationship AFOSI liaison, Rick Doty. Pilkington states that Doty, while also working on befriending UFO investigator Paul Bennewitz to "steer him deeper into his War of the Worlds fantasy", was provided with details of ongoing UFO investigations by Moore, and that this information was subsequently used to create "bogus government documentation" to use as disinformation against the UFO community. Moore claimed that AFOSI had co-opted him by falsely promising he would be given access to genuine government documents about UFOs. Doty appears in the 2013 documentary of the same name, where he acknowledges his role in spreading UFO disinformation.

== Critical reception ==
According to author Barna William Donovan, The Philadelphia Experiment - Project Invisibility was "largely dismissed even by the most committed conspiracy and supernatural buffs as nothing more than a shoddy, uncritical repeat of a lingering and completely unsubstantiated urban myth." Donovan wrote that critics have deemed The Roswell Incident "a collection of wild hearsay" offering "second - and third-hand accounts Berlitz and Moore then use for fantastic speculation and to jump to a lot of unwarranted conclusions", and that when critics and skeptics characterized the Majestic 12 documents as fraudulent, "The accusing fingers were pointing at Moore."

== Books ==
- The Philadelphia Experiment: Project Invisibility. New York: Ballantine Books (1979).
- The Roswell Incident, with Charles Berlitz. New York: Grosset & Dunlap (1980). ISBN 978-0448211992.

== See also ==
- UFO conspiracy theory
