= Ars Paradoxica =

Sci-fi podcast

- Genre: Science Fiction, Time Travel
- Language: English

Creative team
- Created by: Mischa Stanton; Daniel Manning
- Written by: Mischa Stanton; Daniel Manning; Eli Barraza; Julian Mundy; Danielle Shemaiah; Tau Zaman

Music
- Opening theme: "Redshift (Theme for ars Paradoxica)" by Mischa Stanton
- Ending theme: "Electric River (acoustic)" by Eno Freedman-Brodmann

Production
- Length: 30–55 minutes

Publication
- No. of episodes: 36
- Original release: June 1, 2015 – June 6, 2018
- Updates: Completed

Related
- Website: arsparadoxica.com

Ars Paradoxica (stylized as ars PARADOXICA) is a science fiction podcast created by Mischa Stanton and Daniel Manning. In-universe audio recordings tell the story of Dr. Sally Grissom, a scientist from the present day that accidentally invents time travel and is sent back to the USS Eldridge in 1943. The series was originally aired from June 2015 to June 2018.

Ars Paradoxica's production was funded in part by their Patreon, which garnered them around $800 a month as of 2017. The show has also received several awards, including best writing, best engineering, best new show, and best show overall from Audio Verse.

== Summary ==
=== Synopsis ===
Modern-day scientist Dr. Sally Grissom accidentally sends herself back to 1943, finding herself aboard the USS Eldridge during the Philadelphia Experiment. She is recruited by the United States government to continue developing this new time travel technology under a secret branch of the government called the Office of Developed Anomalous Resources (ODAR), with the goal of using this technology to help the United States win World War II and the Cold War. Grissom and her colleagues find themselves entrenched in politics and interpersonal struggles as they work to repair and improve their time travel device, the Timepiece, and avoid changing too much of the past.

After the end of World War II, the government continues to fund their work as new obstacles arise. They discover that time travel causes an illness called Butterfly Syndrome, which causes brain damage that makes individuals constantly switch tenses while speaking. A cure is eventually discovered—raising children backwards through time makes them immune to Butterfly Syndrome—but the cost is steep.

=== Cast and characters ===
- Kristen DiMercurio as Dr. Sally Grissom, a theoretical physicist and the fictional granddaughter of astronaut Gus Grissom. She is aromantic and asexual.
- Reyn Beeler as Chet Whickman, the first person Grissom met upon arriving in 1943 and an officer in the U.S. Navy.
- Katie Speed as Esther Roberts, an ambitious woman that started out as a calculator.
- Zach Ehrlich as Jack Wyatt, Esther Roberts' lab partner.
- Robin Gabrielli as Anthony Partridge, a former high school math teacher that now runs ODAR's Predictive Mechanics division after discovering how to reliably predict the future.
- Susanna Kavee as Helen Partridge, a singer and wife of Anthony Partridge.
- Rob Slotnick as Director Bill Donovan, a character based on William "Wild Bill" Donovan, former director of the OSS.
- Dan Anderson as Hank Cornish
- Arjun Gupta as Dr. Nikhil Sharma, an ODAR agent from the future that Grissom encounters in Philadelphia.
- Lia Peros as Petra
- L. Jeffrey Moore as Lou Gaines
- Preston Allen as Bridget Chambers, ex-lover of Esther Roberts.
- Lee Satterwhite as Quentin Barlowe/Ben Quigley
- Hannah Trobaugh as June Barlowe
- Charlotte Mary Wen as Penny Wise
- Bernardo Cubría as Mateo Morales
- Richard Malmos as Agent Ray Vico
- Richard Penner as Dr. Fitzgerald
- Lauren Shippen as Maggie Elbourne
- Tina Huang as Tonya LeMartine
- Sammi Lappin as Miriam Roberts
- Ego Mikitas as Adler

== Awards and nominations ==
Audio Verse Awards
Year	Award	Recipient	Status	Ref.
2016	Best Audio Engineering of an Original, Ongoing, Long Form Production	Mischa Stanton for ars PARADOXICA	Won	
2016	Best Writing of an Original, Long Form, Large Cast, Ongoing Production	Daniel Manning, Mischa Stanton, Julian Mundy, Tau Zaman, Danielle Shemaiah Pointer and Eli Barraza for ars PARADOXICA	Won	
2016	Best Original, Long Form, Large Cast, Ongoing, Dramatic Production	ars PARADOXICA	Won	
2016	Best New Original, Long Form, Large Cast, Ongoing Production	ars PARADOXICA	Won	
2016	Best Performance of an Actress in an Original Leading Role for a Long Form Production	Kristen DiMercurio as Sally Grissom in ars PARADOXICA	Finalist	
2017	Best Audio Engineering for an Ongoing, Dramatic, Production	Mischa Stanton for ars PARADOXICA	Won	

The Webby Awards
Year	Award	Recipient	Status	Ref.
2017	Best Sound Design/ Original Music Score 2017	ars PARADOXICA	Nominated	
