= The Bermuda Triangle (film) =

1978 film

- Directed by: René Cardona Jr.
- Written by: René Cardona Jr.; Carlos Valdemar
- Based on: The Bermuda Triangle by Charles Berlitz
- Produced by: René Cardona Jr.; Angelo Giacomo
- Starring: John Huston; Gloria Guida; Marina Vlady; Claudine Auger; Hugo Stiglitz; Andrés García
- Cinematography: León Sánchez
- Edited by: Alfredo Rosas Priego
- Music by: Stelvio Cipriani
- Release date: 10 February 1978
- Running time: 112 minutes
- Countries: Mexico; Italy
- Language: English

The Bermuda Triangle (Spanish: El Triángulo diabólico de las Bermudas, Italian: Il triangolo delle Bermude, also known as The Secrets of the Bermuda Triangle and Devil's Triangle of Bermuda) is a 1978 Mexican-Italian science fiction horror film written and directed by René Cardona Jr.

== Plot ==
The boat Black Whale III sails into the Bermuda Triangle with the Marvin family aboard, intending to search for the remains of Atlantis. Along the way, they discover a doll floating in the water, which Diana Marvin—the family's youngest daughter—takes as her own. Diana appears to become possessed by the doll, and starts saying that everyone will die, and telling people the order they will die in. She also locks the ship's cook Simon in the freezer, who almost dies before he is freed. One night, the boat follows a Fresnel lens signaling an SOS even though nothing appears on the radar. They abandon the search after the signal identifies itself as a ship that was lost years ago.

The Black Whale III reaches its destination, and the crew begins a scuba exploration of some underwater ruins. A submarine earthquake disturbs the ruins and crushes the legs of Michelle, the family's eldest daughter. The ship attempts to head for the nearby island of Bimini for help, but they become stuck in a storm, hit some rocks, and have their engines and helm damaged. Simon dies in an apparent accident during the storm, and Diana's parents Edward and Michelle are swept overboard looking for her. The next day, the engineer Gordon dies trying to repair the helm when Diana turns on the engines while he is inspecting the propellers. With the ship stranded and Michelle in desperate need of medical attention, the ship's mate Alan and Michelle's brother Dave depart the ship with her in a motorboat to try to reach Bimini. Michelle perishes on the voyage, and the boat becomes lost and never reaches its destination. Diana's aunt Sybil then vanishes, apparently killed by the doll.

Back on Black Whale III, the captain Mark Briggs attempts to signal for help. They hear distress calls from other ships, including their own being repeated. Finally, they are able to contact Bimini and relate their situation. At Bimini, the radar operator says that their story is implausible, for the Black Whale III disappeared about twelve years ago with a family named Marvin aboard. The ship disappears, and the doll is left floating in the water.

== Cast ==
- John Huston as Edward Marvin
- Gloria Guida as Michelle Marvin
- Marina Vlady as Kim Marvin
- Hugo Stiglitz as Mark Briggs
- Carlos East as Peter Marvin
- Claudine Auger as Sybil Marvin
- Al Coster as Dave Marvin
- Andrés García as Alan
- Gretha as Diana Marvin
- Miguel Angel Fuentes as Gordon
- Jorge Zamora as Simon
