= SS Andrew Furuseth =

World War II Liberty ship of the United States

History

United States
- Name: Andrew Furuseth
- Namesake: Andrew Furuseth
- Owner: United States Maritime Commission
- Operator: Matson Navigation Company
- Builder: Permanente Metals Corp.
- Yard number: No. 1; Richmond, California
- Way number: 1
- Laid down: 22 July 1942
- Launched: 7 September 1942
- Completed: 8 October 1942
- In service: after 8 October 1942
- Fate: Sold to Norwegian interests as Essi, 1947; Sold to Japanese interests as Niobe, 1959; Scrapped June 1967, Nirao, Japan

General characteristics
- Class & type: Liberty ship; type EC2-S-C1, standard
- Tonnage: 7,176 GRT, 10,865 DWT
- Displacement: 14,245 long tons (14,474 t)
- Length: 441 feet 6 inches (135 m) oa; 416 feet (127 m) pp; 427 feet (130 m) lwl
- Beam: 57 feet (17 m)
- Draft: 27 ft 9.25 in (8.4646 m)
- Propulsion: 1 × triple-expansion steam engine, (manufactured by Joshua Hendy Iron Works, Sunnyvale, California); 1 × screw propeller
- Speed: 11.5 knots (21.3 km/h; 13.2 mph)
- Capacity: 562,608 cubic feet (15,931 m^{3}) (grain); 499,573 cubic feet (14,146 m^{3}) (bale)
- Troops: 550
- Complement: 38–62 USMM; 21–40 USNAG
- Armament: Varied by ship; Bow-mounted 3-inch (76 mm)/50-caliber gun; Stern-mounted 4-inch (102 mm)/50-caliber gun; 2–8 × single 20-millimeter (0.79 in) Oerlikon anti-aircraft (AA) cannons and/or, 2–8 × 37-millimeter (1.46 in) M1 AA guns

SS Andrew Furuseth was a Liberty ship built for the United States Maritime Commission during World War II. The ship was named in honor of American merchant seaman and labor organizer Andrew Furuseth. The ship was assigned by the War Shipping Administration to Matson Navigation Company who operated it throughout the war in the Atlantic and Mediterranean. Andrew Furuseth was one of 220 Liberty ships converted to carry a limited number of troops or prisoners of war.

The Andrew Furuseth is likely best remembered as the ship that Carl M. Allen/Carlos Miguel Allende was to have been serving on in October 1943 when he claims to have witnessed the teleportation disappearance and reappearance of USS Eldridge as part of the Philadelphia Experiment.

Andrew Furuseth was sold for private use and operated under the names Essi and Niobe before being scrapped in Japan in 1967.

== History ==
=== Construction and launching ===
In July 1942, the Sailors' Union of the Pacific petitioned the United States Maritime Commission and the War Shipping Administration (WSA) for a liberty ship to be named in honor of Andrew Furuseth, the long-time president of their union. Accordingly, MC Hull No. 491 was assigned the name Andrew Furuseth and was laid down on 22 July 1942 on shipway 1 at Yard No. 1 by Permanente Metals Corp. of Richmond, California, as a standard Liberty ship. The ship was launched on 7 September 1942; delivered 8 October 1942, taking 78 days from laying of the keel to delivery. The ship was assigned by the WSA to Matson Navigation Company for operation.

==== Launching ceremony ====
Andrew Furuseth was one of six Liberty ships named for labor leaders, and one of 174 ships total, launched on Labor Day, 7 September 1942. In addition to the Furuseth, the other five Liberty ships were SS Samuel Gompers, SS Peter J. McGuire, SS James Duncan, SS John Mitchell, and SS John W. Brown. The launch ceremonies, held at four different shipyards around the country, were to be linked by a coast-to-coast broadcast and feature speeches by John P. Frey, an executive of the American Federation of Labor, and John W. Green, president of the Congress of Industrial Organizations.

=== Wartime service ===
After shakedown on the West Coast, Andrew Furuseth transited the Panama Canal in April 1943. The ship departed Cristóbal, Panama, on 24 April for Guantánamo Bay and New York, arriving at that city on 8 May. The Furuseth left New York 28 May for Oran, passing Gibraltar around the middle of June.

In late June 1943, Andrew Furuseth arrived in Gibraltar, and on 7 July joined a convoy headed to Hampton Roads, Virginia, arriving there 23 July 1943. On 16 August, the ship made a round trip to Casablanca, arriving off Cape Henry on 4 October.

On 25 October 1943, Andrew Furuseth steamed from Hampton Roads as part of Convoy UGS 22 and arrived at Casablanca on 12 November. In November, the ship sailed from Oran to Augusta, Sicily. Through the end of 1943, the ship plied the waters of the Mediterranean, calling at Augusta, Oran, Naples, and Bizerte, before returning to Hampton Roads on 17 January 1944.

In February 1944, the Furuseth departed on another voyage to Augusta, with a cargo of explosives, 500 troops, and 2500 pieces of mail. The ship made a roundtrip to Naples before returning to Hampton Roads on 14 April 1944.

In May, the veteran steamship departed Hampton Roads for another trip to Oran with 44 troops aboard. The Furuseth returned to Virginia in mid June, but left again for Oran in mid July. The ship operated locally in the Mediterranean through the end of November, at which time Andrew Furuseth returned once again to Hampton Roads.

On 29 December 1944 and again on 14 March 1945, the Liberty ship departed on roundtrips to Oran, returning on 24 February and 9 May, respectively.

With the end of hostilities in Europe, Andrew Furuseth began the task returning troops to the United States. Typical voyages included returning troops to Boston on 3 August, 735 troops to New York on 2 October, 570 troops from Antwerp to New York on 10 December, and 573 troops from Le Havre to New York on 19 January 1946. During the December voyage from Antwerp, a soldier aboard Andrew Furuseth was transferred by motor launch in mid-ocean to U.S. Navy transport USS Lejeune for an emergency appendectomy.

=== Later career ===
In 1947, Andrew Furuseth was sold to Norwegian interests and renamed Essi. In 1959, she was sold to Japanese owners and renamed Niobe. In June 1967, Niobe was scrapped at Nirao, Japan.

== Philadelphia Experiment ==
SS Andrew Furuseth is associated with the Philadelphia Experiment, which is now widely regarded as a hoax. A reputed crew member of the Andrew Furuseth, known variously as "Carl M. Allen" and "Carlos Miguel Allende", claimed to have witnessed the sudden appearance and disappearance of U.S. Navy destroyer escort USS Eldridge (DE-173) in October 1943.

The story goes that, as part of U.S. Navy experiments into rendering ships invisible, Eldridge vanished from its berth in Philadelphia and was accidentally teleported to Norfolk, Virginia and back again on 28 October 1943. According to the U.S. Navy, no evidence has been uncovered supporting that such an experiment occurred and details of the story contradict facts about the Eldridge. Also, the Navy archives contains a letter from Lt. (j.g.) William S. Dodge, USNR, (Ret.), the Master of Andrew Furuseth in 1943, categorically denying that he or his crew observed any unusual event while in Norfolk. Eldridge and Andrew Furuseth were not even in Norfolk at the same time.

== Notable crew members ==
- John Kenley, American theatrical producer
- Carl M. Allen, reputed crew member and witness to events of the Philadelphia Experiment
