= USS Eldridge =

United States Navy destroyer escort ship (1943–1951)

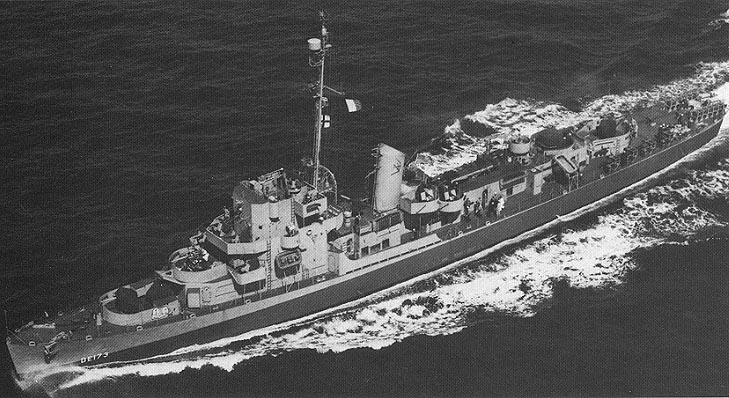
- USS Eldridge (DE-173) c. 1944

History

United States
- Name: Eldridge
- Namesake: John Eldridge Jr.
- Ordered: 1942
- Builder: Federal Shipbuilding and Drydock Company, Newark, New Jersey
- Laid down: 22 February 1943
- Launched: 25 July 1943
- Commissioned: 27 August 1943
- Decommissioned: 17 June 1946
- Stricken: 26 March 1951
- Fate: Sold to Greece, 15 January 1951

General characteristics
- Class & type: Cannon-class destroyer escort
- Displacement: 1,240 long tons (1,260 t) (standard); 1,620 long tons (1,646 t) (full load)
- Length: 306 ft (93 m) o/a; 300 ft (91 m) w/l
- Beam: 36 ft 10 in (11.23 m)
- Draft: 11 ft 8 in (3.56 m)
- Installed power: 4 × GM Mod. 16-278A diesel engines; 6,000 shp (4,500 kW)
- Propulsion: 4 × Diesel–electric transmission; 2 × screws
- Speed: 21 kn (39 km/h; 24 mph)
- Range: 10,800 nmi (12,400 mi; 20,000 km) at 12 kn (22 km/h; 14 mph)
- Complement: 15 officers and 201 enlisted
- Armament: 3 × 3 in (76 mm)/50 caliber Mk. 22 guns; 1 × twin 40 mm (1.57 in) Bofors Mk. 1 anti-aircraft AA gun; 8 × 20 mm (0.79 in) Oerlikon Mk. 4 AA cannons; 3 × 21 in (530 mm) torpedo tubes (1×3); 1 × Hedgehog Mk.10 anti-submarine mortar (144 rounds); 8 × Mk. 6 depth charge projectors; 2 × Mk. 9 depth charge tracks

USS Eldridge (DE-173), a Cannon-class destroyer escort, was a ship of the United States Navy named for Lieutenant Commander John Eldridge Jr., who led an operation for the invasion of the Solomon Islands.

It was the subject of a hoax, the "Philadelphia Experiment", where merchant mariner Carl Meredith Allen claimed that the U.S. Navy had conducted cloaking and teleportation experiments on the ship at the Philadelphia Naval Shipyard in 1943.

== Namesake ==
John Eldridge Jr. was born in Buckingham County, Virginia, on 10 October 1903 and graduated from the United States Naval Academy in 1927. After flight training at Pensacola, Florida, he served at various stations on aviation duty. From 11 September 1941, he was Commander, Scouting Squadron 71, attached to Wasp (CV-7). Lieutenant Commander Eldridge was killed in action in the Solomon Islands on 2 November 1942. For his extraordinary heroism in leading the air attack on Japanese positions in the initial invasion of the Solomons on 7 August and 8 August 1942, he was posthumously awarded the Navy Cross.

== Construction ==
Eldridge was laid down 22 February 1943, by the Federal Shipbuilding and Dry Dock Company in Newark, New Jersey. Eldridge was launched on 25 July 1943, sponsored by Lieutenant Commander Eldridge's widow Mrs. John Eldridge Jr., and commissioned on 27 August 1943.

== Service history ==
Between 4 January 1944 and 9 May 1945, Eldridge sailed on the vital task of escorting, to the Mediterranean Sea, men and materials to support Allied operations in North Africa and on into southern Europe. She made nine voyages to deliver convoys safely to Casablanca, Bizerte, and Oran.

Eldridge departed New York City on 28 May 1945, for service in the Pacific. En route to Saipan in July, she made contact with an underwater object and immediately attacked, but no results were observed. She arrived at Okinawa on 7 August, for local escort and patrol, and with the end of hostilities a week later, continued to serve as escort on the Saipan–Ulithi–Okinawa routes until November. Eldridge was placed out of commission in reserve 17 June 1946.

On 15 January 1951, she was transferred under the Mutual Defense Assistance Act to Greece where she served as Leon (D54). Leon was decommissioned on 5 November 1992, and on 11 November 1999, was sold as scrap to the Piraeus-based firm V&J Scrapmetal Trading Ltd.

== Awards ==

- American Campaign Medal
- European-African-Middle Eastern Campaign Medal
- Asiatic-Pacific Campaign Medal
- World War II Victory Medal (United States)
- Navy Occupation Service Medal with "ASIA" clasp

== In popular culture ==
The "Philadelphia Experiment" was a purported naval military experiment at the Philadelphia Naval Shipyard in Philadelphia, Pennsylvania, sometime around 28 October 1943, in which Eldridge was to be rendered invisible (i.e., by a cloaking device) to human observers for a brief period. The story is considered a hoax: there is a general lack of evidence for the alleged experiment; the person who started the myth—a merchant seaman named Carl Meredith Allen— relayed it to Morris K. Jessup; and the Eldridge's deck log and war diary (preserved on microfilm) show that the ship was never in Philadelphia between August and December 1943.

The film The Philadelphia Experiment is based on the "Philadelphia Experiment" story and features two sailors aboard the USS Eldridge.

The audio drama podcast Ars Paradoxica works on the premise that the Philadelphia Experiment was conducted, but did not work as intended, instead creating time travel. Because of this, people can only travel back in time towards the place and time the experiment initially occurred, the deck of the USS Eldridge in 1943.

The USS Eldridge is referenced in the X-Files episode Død Kalm as having disappeared and possibly gone through a wrinkle in time comparable to the Bermuda Triangle.

The plot of the 2005 television miniseries The Triangle also uses the premise that the Philadelphia Experiment was conducted but did not work as intended. In the third episode, it is revealed that the US Navy believes that the experiment aboard the USS Eldridge in 1943 was responsible for creating a tear in the fabric of space-time which they refer to as the Bermuda Triangle.

The Doctor Who audio drama, The Macros, explores the proposed Philadelphia Experiment as if the ship had entered an alternative dimension but at the loss of its crew.

The USS Eldridge makes a brief appearance in the episode "Journey into Mystery" of the Disney+ series Loki, which is set in the Marvel Cinematic Universe (MCU). The episode suggested that the Philadelphia Experiment was indeed conducted, and the ship was actually teleported to the Void.

== Bibliography ==
- "Eldridge (DE-173)". Dictionary of American Naval Fighting Ships. Naval History and Heritage Command. 7 April 2016. This article incorporates text from this source, which is in the public domain.
- "HELLENIC NAVY – LEON D-54 (1951–1992)". hellenicnavy.gr. Archived from the original on 28 September 2009.
- Carroll, Robert Todd (3 December 2007). "Philadelphia experiment". The Skeptic's Dictionary.
- Adams, Cecil (23 October 1987). "Did the U.S. Navy teleport ships in the Philadelphia Experiment?". The Straight Dope. Archived from the original on 6 January 2009.
- "Philadelphia Experiment". Naval Historical Center of the United States Navy. 20 November 2015.
