= Peter Rugg =

Literary character

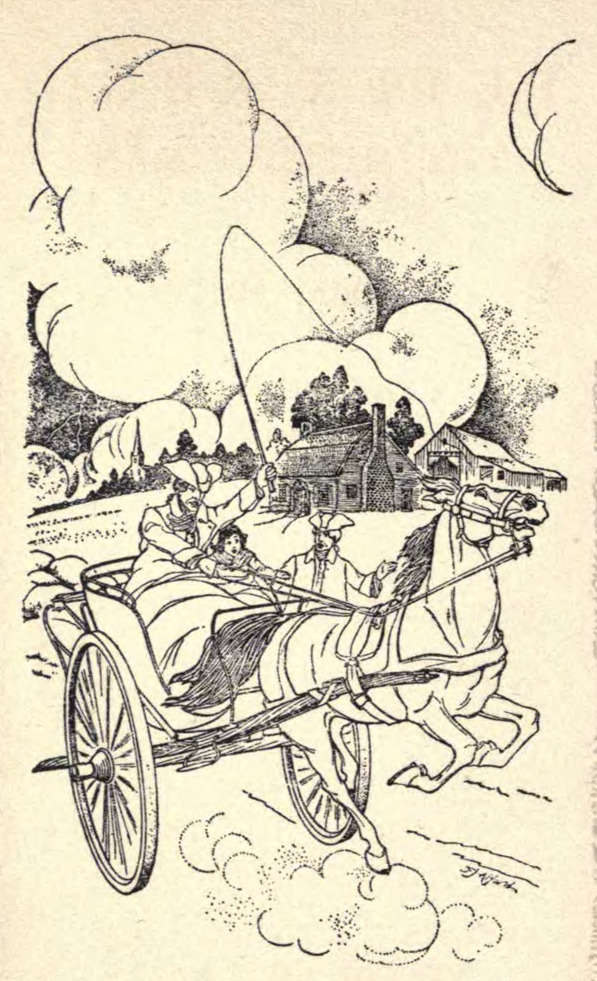
Illustration from a 1910 edition of the collected Peter Rugg stories

Peter Rugg is a New England literary character who figures in several American short stories and poems. Rugg is a stubborn and angry man, born about 1730. He rides out into a thunderstorm in the year of the Boston Massacre (1770), and is cursed to drive his carriage till the end of time. Travelers claim to have sighted him along one road or another, driving a carriage with a child at his side, and declaring that he will reach Boston by nightfall.

== Origin ==
Rugg is often assumed to be a folk character out of New England legends. Actually he was simply made up in 1824 by attorney and writer William Austin (1778–1841). Austin, writing under the pseudonym "Jonathan Dunwell", wrote the tale "Peter Rugg: The Missing Man" in an epistolary style that suggested reportage. Initially the Rugg story appeared in The New England Magazine, a Boston Masonic periodical. When reprinted by The New England Galaxy almost immediately afterwards, many readers took it to be a nonfiction account.

When readers wrote into the Galaxy asking for further news and references about the Rugg legend, Austin/Dunwell obliged with two further tales, in which Rugg is reported as having been sighted in New York, Virginia and elsewhere. In an epilogue to the original story, also written by "Dunwell", Rugg finally arrives home after nearly 60 years, only to find that his wife has died, his old mansion has been torn down, and the site has been auctioned off for building lots.

The fictional origin of the story is sometimes forgotten or ignored even in modern publications. For instance, Daniel Cohen in his The Encyclopedia of Ghosts (1994) presents the story as an actual report of a supernatural phenomenon, confounding Austin with his fictional first-person narrator: "A complete version of this story is said to come in a letter from a man named William Austin, who claimed to have actually seen and spoken with the ghost. In the letter Austin said that he first encountered the wanderer in 1826 when he was taking a coach out of Boston ..."

== Later use ==
The story is said to have had a profound effect on the young Nathaniel Hawthorne when he was a student at Bowdoin. Peter Rugg is mentioned in Hawthorne's story, "The Virtuoso's Collection", in Mosses from an Old Manse (1842). Herman Melville's title character in "Bartleby, the Scrivener" seems to allude to Rugg's wandering. Two women poets of New England wrote long verse based on the Rugg story. Louise Imogen Guiney, in "Peter Rugg, the Bostonian", published in Scribner's Magazine (December 1891), gave a new version of the story in which the wandering Rugg was accompanied by his "little son" rather than the ten-year-old daughter, Jenny, who was the child in the original tale. Amy Lowell published her prose-poem ballad "Before the Storm: the Legend of Peter Rugg" in North American Review (September 1917). In Lowell's piece, Rugg drives through Boston but does not recognize it after many years. Both poets recalled the Rugg story as a ghost tale from their childhood, and evidently were unaware of its literary origin in Austin's stories.

According to Alexander Woollcott, Rudyard Kipling and his English publisher A.S. Frere-Reeves were largely responsible for rediscovering Austin and publicizing the origins of the Peter Rugg tale.

== See also ==
- Flying Dutchman, a sea captain who sails the sea forever
- Angels of Mons, another literary ghost story sometimes taken as an actual report
- Vanishing hitchhiker – legend of a ghostly Hitchhiker who is repeatedly given a ride to her grave.
- Chasse-galerie, a canoe and its crew of voyageurs are rowing in the air of the winter of French-Canadian Canada with Old Scratch.
