= Doomsday 1999 A.D. =

1982 book by Charles Berlitz

Doomsday 1999: Countdown to a New Apocalypse
- Title page for Doomsday 1999 A.D. (1981)
- Author: Charles Berlitz
- Language: English
- Genre: Non-fiction
- Publication date: 1981

Doomsday 1999: Countdown to a New Apocalypse is a book by Charles Berlitz, published in 1981 that lists scientific, religious, and other common predictions for impending doom from all corners of the world.

== Summary ==
In the book, environment, famine, overpopulation, climate changes, floods, tornadoes, hothouse effect (now commonly referred to as greenhouse effect), etc. are generally predicted to worsen and become acute by the end of the 20th century. Berlitz lists of doomsday years start with the year 999, December 31 when many expected Jesus to return and goes through a great many doomsday prophecies by scientists, prophets, astrologers and others. In chapter 8, he asks whether the world has ended before, mentioning Atlantis, an idea which he revisits later in his books The Mystery of Atlantis and Atlantis: The Lost Continent Revealed.

Berlitz suggests that there may have been a flood, an idea which he explores further in his book The Lost Ship of Noah: In Search of the Ark at Ararat (1987) and in chapter 9 where he cites the tales of a great flood from the Bible and the Torah, Sumerian, Babylonian, Assyrian, Greek, Indian, Persian, Welsh, Norse, Lithuanian, Irish, Chinese, Aztec-Toltec, Maya records and Chibcha tales.

== See also ==
- Apocalyptic literature
