= Curses, Hexes and Spells =

Children's book by Daniel Cohen

- Author: Daniel Cohen
- Language: English
- Publisher: Lippincott Williams & Wilkins
- Publication date: November 1, 1974
- Publication place: United States
- Media type: Print (hardcover and paperback)
- Pages: 125
- ISBN: 0-397-31493-0

Curses, Hexes and Spells is a 1974 book by Daniel Cohen. Marketed as children's book, it explains what "curses" are, and describes supposed curses on families (such as the House of Atreus in Greek mythology, the House of Habsburg or the Kennedy family), creatures, places (the Bermuda Triangle, the Devil's Sea), wanderers (like the Flying Dutchman) and ghosts. It also describes a few protective amulets from supposed "occult" dangers, and briefly touches on birthstones.

Curses, Hexes, and Spells is number 73 on the American Library Association's list of the 100 Most Frequently Challenged Books of 1990–2000. The book also appears on several other lists of "banned"/challenged books in the United States such as The New York Times 50 Most Frequently Banned Books in which it is number 11.
