= When Someone You Know Is Gay =

1989 non-fiction book by Susan and Daniel Cohen

- First edition cover (publ. M. Evans)
- Author: Susan and Daniel Cohen
- Publisher: M. Evans
- Publication date: May 1, 1989
- ISBN: 978-0-87-131567-0

When Someone You Know Is Gay is a 1989 non-fiction book by Susan and Daniel Cohen.

In 1990, When Someone You Know Is Gay was a finalist for the Lambda Literary Award for Children's and Young Adult Literature and the American Library Association's (ALA) Gay and Lesbian Book Award. According to the ALA's Office for Intellectual Freedom, the book is also regularly banned and challenged in the United States.

== Reception ==
According to Kirkus Reviews, When Someone You Know Is Gay provides "straight readers with understanding and insight" and that "the Cohens' tone should be reassuring to a gay teen who has not yet found a support network".

Publishers Weekly similarly indicated that the "book performs a needed service" and highlighted how "the emphasis is on understanding" the LGBT+ community.

Carolyn Polese, writing for School Library Journal, highlighted the book's "excellent and thorough discussion of religion and homosexuality" and pointed out the "interviews with teenagers who are struggling to come to terms with their sexual orientation", which may "help straight readers understand the realities that their gay and lesbian counterparts face". However, Polese noted that "in trying to address the subject on a teenager's level, the Cohens have used some highly charged language", such as writing, "Being gay is a social disaster. Who wants to be known as 'the faggot's friend?'". Polese indicated that this language can "sell readers short", even if it is "intended to show that the authors understand teens' feelings".
