= Native Tongues (book) =

Book by Charles Berlitz

Native Tongues (1982) is a book written by Charles Berlitz, a linguist and polyglot, known for his language teaching courses. It is primarily made up of a list of words in various languages, their etymology, and questions of a speculative nature about these words. It explores whether animals have language and the role of gender in language. It makes the claim that language cannot be separated from culture.

== Description ==
Native Tongues explains how languages started and follows their spread and decline. It demonstrates how similar many languages are using the example of English and German. It also aims to demonstrate how gender-dependent language can be. It explains the origins of words and what they really mean to people, examining words of love and insults in different countries, languages and cultures.

Much of the book relates to listings of good and bad translations. It also shows differences between British and American English. The book goes beyond grammar, syntax and phonology, to present the idea that language is deeply rooted culture and modes of thinking.

ISBN 0-7858-1827-8
