= The Encyclopedia of Ghosts =

The Encyclopedia of Ghosts is a 1984 book by Daniel Cohen that details documented supernatural phenomena.

== Description ==
The Encyclopedia of Ghosts is a book about actual reports of supernatural hauntings. The book is divided into chapters about traditional hauntings, poltergeists, animal spirits, celebrity ghosts and ghostly phenomena. For each entry, author Daniel Cohen provides a condensed version of original reports, as well as an assessment of the veracity of the sighting. (For example, Cohen dismisses The Amityville Horror as a hoax.) The fictional story of Peter Rugg is however misrepresented as an actual report.

Each chapter includes a section of relevant illustrations and photographs as well as a bibliography.

== Reception ==
In the January 1992 edition of Dragon (Issue #177), John C. Bunnell thought this book would be "of considerable value to gamers in search of creatures and plots on which to hang adventures." Although Bunnell found the subject matter to be wide-ranging, he noted that Cohen's summaries sometimes tended towards oversimplification: "in the Tower of London entry, for example, he mentions Richard III’s supposed murder of his princely nephews without noting that modern scholarship on the issue is at least sharply divided." While Bunnell believed that Cohen tried to be objective in his assessments, he noted that "Cohen’s writing style is not always as even-handed as his conclusions. While his introductions and wrap-ups are done in his own voice, journalistic qualifiers are often absent from the stories themselves. That sometimes makes the material sound more authoritative than it really is, and it tilts the books away from unbiased reportage into the realms of speculation." While Bunnell cautioned readers to treat the book as popular journalism rather than scholarship, he concluded by recommending it, saying, "Everyone from AD&D game campaigners to players of espionage and near-future games should find useful accounts in Cohen’s compilations."

== Reviews ==
- Review by Richard E. Geis (1987) in Controversy in Review #17, June-July 1987
