= Richard Winer =

American author

- Born: May 14, 1925
- Died: October 11, 2016 (aged 91)
- Occupation: Author
- Known for: Bermuda Triangle

Richard Winer (May 14, 1925 – October 11, 2016) was an American author of books dealing mainly with alleged mysteries and the paranormal.

== Career ==
=== Bermuda Triangle ===
Winer is best known for his work on the Bermuda Triangle: The Devil's Triangle (1974, Bantam Books), The Devil's Triangle 2 (Bantam Books 1975), and From The Devil's Triangle to The Devil's Jaw (Bantam Books 1977). He also completed a TV film documentary on the Devil's Triangle, narrated by Vincent Price and released in 1974.

Winer claimed that there were "mysterious" things going on in the Bermuda Triangle but denied any paranormal involvement. He stated that "all the answers lie in human error, mechanical malfunction, freak weather or magnetic anomalies."

=== Ghosts ===
Winer was a ghost hunter. He wrote several books about ghosts and haunted houses. His book Haunted Houses (1979) was co-authored with Nancy Osborn.

== Publications ==
- The Devil's Triangle (1974)
- The Devil's Triangle 2 (1976)
- From the Devil's Triangle to the Devil's Jaw (1977)
- Haunted Houses (1979) [with Nancy Osborn]
- More Haunted Houses (1981) [with Nancy Osborn Ishmael]
- Houses of Horror (1983)
- Ghost Ships (2000)
