= John Kenley =

American theatrical producer and performer

- Born: February 20, 1906; Denver, Colorado, U.S.
- Died: October 23, 2009 (aged 103); Cleveland, Ohio, U.S.
- Occupation: Theatrical producer

John Kenley (February 20, 1906 – October 23, 2009) was an American theatrical producer who pioneered the use of television stars in summer stock productions. In 1950, he was the first producer to desegregate live theater in Washington, DC. In 2004 he was made an Honorary Life Member of Actors' Equity for his contributions to American theater. His Kenley Players company was described by Variety as "the largest network of theaters on the straw-hat circuit."

== Early life ==
Kenley was born John Kremchek on February 20, 1906, to Ana Machuga and John Kremchek Zyanskovsky in Denver, Colorado. At birth, he was intersex. His father, a Slovak saloon owner, baptized him as Russian Orthodox. Kenley made his stage debut singing in church in both Russian and English, and was given a solo part at age 4. His family had moved several times ahead of the spread of prohibition, finally settling in Erie, Pennsylvania.

== Performing career ==
After graduating high school at 16, he moved to Cleveland and despite his lack of training worked for a burlesque show as a choreographer. According to Kenley, "I taught the girls silly simple routines. As I taught them, I got pretty good."

Three years later he moved to New York and landed a part as an acrobat in John Murray Anderson's Greenwich Village Follies. With the signing of his first performance contract Kremchek became known as John Kenley. He played the vaudeville circuit throughout the 1920s, dancing, singing, and doing impersonations of Al Jolson, Maurice Chevalier, Ethel Barrymore, and Beatrice Lillie.

From 1928 to 1940, Kenley worked as an assistant to producer Lee Shubert. He estimated he read 1000 scripts during that period and discovered William Saroyan's The Time of Your Life and Lillian Hellman's first play, The Children's Hour.

== Producing career ==
During World War II he joined the Merchant Marines and served aboard the SS Andrew Furuseth. Purser-Pharmacist's mate Kremchek participated in a number of harrowing exploits including the support of Allied landings in Southern France. When a convoy of 30 ships came under attack, he was aboard one of only eight that remained afloat. His practical jokes and quirky humor aboard ship earned him the nickname, "The Storm Petrel of the Merchant Marines".

After the war, Kenley was unable to find stage work in New York and began producing summer stock in Pennsylvania and Ohio. His first theater was converted from a Greek Byzantine church in Deer Lake, Pennsylvania and his second a new theatre in Barnesville, Pennsylvania. He produced The Barretts of Wimpole Street played at the Barnesville theatre in 1950 starring Susan Peters as the invalid Elizabeth Barrett. Peters was a former MGM starlet who had been paralyzed from the waist down in a hunting accident. When he took the show to Washington DC, he became the first producer to desegregate live theater there.

Over the next fifty years, Kenley's summer stock productions became what Variety called the "largest network of theaters on the straw hat circuit". His Kenley Players company brought popular shows and celebrities to Ohio, in Akron, Cleveland, Columbus, Dayton, Toledo, and Warren. Many of the shows also played in Flint, Michigan. Kenley often rode his bike backstage through the large theaters and was known for putting make-up on his dog, Sadie. He often came up with gimmicks to market and sell tickets.

Well-known film and TV actors appeared in his productions, also to sell tickets; Kenley was one of the first to use this concept. During the TV version of The Odd Couple (1970 TV series), stars Jack Klugman and Tony Randall recreated their TV roles in Neil Simon's original play. Jayne Mansfield played in Bus Stop, Bobby Rydell appeared in West Side Story, Merv Griffin was cast in Come Blow Your Horn, Rock Hudson in Camelot, Karla DeVito in Pirates of Penzance and Robby Benson in Evita.

In 1995 at the age of 89, he was still producing summer shows in parts of Ohio.

== Personal life and death ==
Kenley was intersex, according to Griffin and Barbara Eden. Eden recalled him confiding in her that his parents had concluded "it would be easier for him to go through life as a male rather than as a female," and that he spent the theater season in Ohio and the off season living in Palm Springs as a woman named Joan. In his unpublished memoirs, Kenley writes, "People have often wondered if I am gay. Sometimes I wished I was. Life would have been simpler. Androgyny is overrated."

Kenley died on October 23, 2009, aged 103, of pneumonia at the Cleveland Clinic in Cleveland, Ohio.

== Legacy ==
Kenley is credited with introducing professional live theater to the Midwest, laying the groundwork for national tours of Broadway productions. Dorothy Kilgallen in 1964 devoted a The Voice of Broadway column to the Kenley Players, writing that Broadway producers should spend "a few pleasant days in Warren, Ohio. … There is a man out there who knows how to get people into the theater—and in show business, that's Trick 1." He "pioneered the notion of putting TV stars in summer stock years before everyone started doing it."

In 1950, he broke the color line in Washington DC, bringing a production of The Barretts of Wimpole Street to Washington and advertising that all seats were "available to any paying customer, without regard for race." Washington was at the time "without professional theater because, in response to segregationist seating policies, the Actors Equity union would not allow its members to perform there," and police showed up on opening night expecting a riot. After a sold-out, trouble-free two-week engagement, Kenley was "feted in the local media, with civil-rights pundits lauding the nobility of his groundbreaking production."

In 2004, Actors' Equity awarded Kenley an Honorary Life Membership, calling out his "extraordinary contribution to the American theater" and describing him as having "refined and ultimately defined the golden days of Equity Summer Stock."
