= Morris K. Jessup =

American UFO researcher (1900–1959)

- Born: March 2, 1900
- Died: April 20, 1959 (aged 59)
- Known for: UFO conspiracy theories including Philadelphia Experiment

Morris Ketchum Jessup (March 2, 1900 – April 20, 1959) was an American ufologist. He had a Master of Science degree in astronomy and, though employed for most of his life as an automobile-parts salesman and a photographer, is probably best remembered for his writings on UFOs.

== Early life ==
Born near Rockville, Indiana, Jessup grew up with an interest in astronomy. He earned a bachelor of science degree in astronomy from The University of Michigan in Ann Arbor, Michigan in 1925 and, while working at the Lamont-Hussey Observatory, received a master of science degree in 1926. Though he began work on his doctorate in astrophysics, he ended his dissertation work in 1931 and never earned the PhD. Nevertheless, he was sometimes referred to as "Dr. Jessup". He apparently dropped his career and studies in astronomy and worked for the rest of his life in a variety of jobs unrelated to science, although he is sometimes erroneously described as having been an instructor in astronomy and mathematics at the University of Michigan and Drake University.

== Career ==
Jessup has been referred to in ufological circles as "probably the most original extraterrestrial hypothesiser of the 1950s", and it has been said of him that he was "educated in astronomy and archeology and had working experience in both." Actual evidence of an educational background in archaeology or archaeological field work is absent from Jessup's resume, but Jerome Clark reports that Jessup took part in archeological expeditions to the Yucatan and Peru in the 1920s. Jessup documented an expedition to Cuzco he took part in during 1930. In 1923, along with University of Michigan botanist Carl D. LaRue and plant pathologist James Weir, Jessup participated as a photographer in a U.S. Department of Agriculture expedition to Brazil to study the possibility of growing rubber in the Amazon. Henry Ford would later draw on the expedition's findings, as well as the assistance of LaRue and Weir, when planning Fordlandia, his rubber plantation in the Amazon.

Jessup achieved some notoriety with his 1955 book The Case for the UFO, in which he argued that unidentified flying objects (UFOs) represented a mysterious subject worthy of further study. Jessup speculated that UFOs were "exploratory craft of 'solid' and 'nebulous' character." Jessup also "linked ancient monuments with prehistoric superscience"; years later similar claims were made by Erich von Däniken in Chariots of the Gods? in 1968 and other books. A copy of The Case for the UFO unwittingly became the nexus of a whole other conspiracy theory when Carl Meredith Allen (sometimes calling himself Carlos Miguel Allende), an ex-merchant mariner, sent it covered in scribbled notes to a US Navy research institute, and sent a series of letters to Jessup himself, laying out an incident Allen claimed to have witnessed during World War II where the US Navy made a ship invisible and accidentally teleported it through space, the so-called "Philadelphia Experiment".

Jessup wrote three further flying-saucer books, UFOs and the Bible, The UFO Annual (both 1956), and The Expanding Case for the UFO (1957). The latter suggested that transient lunar phenomena were somehow related to UFOs in the earth's skies. Jessup's main flying-saucer scenario came to resemble that of the Shaver Hoax perpetrated by the science-fiction magazine editor Raymond A. Palmer—namely, that "good" and "bad" groups of space aliens were/are meddling with terrestrial affairs. Like most of the writers on flying saucers and the so-called contactees that emerged during the 1950s, Jessup displayed familiarity with the alternative mythology of human prehistory developed by Helena P. Blavatsky's cult of Theosophy, which included the mythical lost continents of Atlantis, Mu, and Lemuria.

== Death ==
Jessup attempted to make a living writing on the subject of UFOs, but his follow-up books did not sell well, and his publisher rejected several other manuscripts. In 1958 his wife left him, and he traveled to New York City; his friends described him as being somewhat unstable. After returning to Florida, he was involved in a serious car accident and was slow to recover, apparently increasing his despondency. On April 20, 1959, in Dade County, Florida, Jessup's car was found along a roadside with Jessup dead inside. A hose had been run from the exhaust pipe into a rear window of the vehicle, which had filled with toxic fumes when turned on. The death was ruled a suicide. Friends said that he had been extremely depressed, and had discussed suicide with them for several months.

Jessup's death would get rolled into more conspiracy theories surrounding the Philadelphia Experiment with some believing that "[t]he circumstances of Jessup's apparent suicide [were] mysterious". The William L. Moore and Charles Berlitz book, The Philadelphia Experiment: Project Invisibility, put forward the conspiracy theory that his death was connected to his knowledge of the Philadelphia Experiment. Friends interviewed in the same book thought the bizarre letters from Carl Meredith Allen may have initiated a decline in Jessup's mental state leading to his eventual suicide.

== Books by Jessup ==
- The Case for the UFO. New York: Citadel Press (1955).
- UFO and the Bible. New York: Citadel Press (1956).
- The UFO Annual. New York: Citadel Press (1956).
- The Expanding Case for the UFO. New York: Citadel Press (1957).

== See also ==
- Ancient Astronauts

== Sources ==
- Clark, Jerome (1988). The UFO Encyclopedia. Detroit: Omnigraphics.
- Richie, David (1994). UFO: The Definitive Guide to Unidentified Flying Objects and Related Phenomena. New York: Facts on File.
- Story, Ronald D. (2001). The Encyclopedia of Extraterrestrial Encounters. Garden City, NY: New American Library.
- Story, Ronald D. (1980). The Encyclopedia of UFOs. Garden City, NY: Doubleday/Dolphin.
- Moore, William L.; Charles Berlitz (1979). The Philadelphia Experiment: Project Invisibility. New York: Fawcett Crest.
- Farrell, Joseph P. (2008). Secrets of the Unified Field: The Philadelphia Experiment, The Nazi Bell, and the Discarded Theory. Adventures Unlimited Press. ISBN 978-1-931882-84-2.
