= Daniel Cohen (children's writer) =

American non-fiction writer

Daniel Edward Cohen
- Born: Daniel Edward Reba; March 12, 1936; Chicago, Illinois, U.S.
- Died: May 6, 2018 (aged 82); Cape May, New Jersey, U.S.
- Education: University of Illinois Urbana-Champaign
- Occupation: Writer
- Spouse: Susan Cohen (née Handler) (m. 1958)
- Writing career
- Language: English
- Genres: Young adult, non-fiction
- Notable works: Curses, Hexes and Spells; When Someone You Know Is Gay

Daniel Edward Cohen (né Reba; March 12, 1936 – May 6, 2018) was an American non-fiction author who wrote over one hundred books on a variety of subjects, mainly for young audiences. He also fought for justice for the death of his daughter and the other 269 victims of the terrorist bombing of Pan Am Flight 103 over Lockerbie, Scotland.

== Early life ==
Daniel Edward Reba was born in Chicago. His father, Edward Reba, and his mother, Suzanne Greenberg, divorced when he was young. Later, his mother married Milton Cohen, and Daniel took his stepfather's surname. Cohen attended Chicago public schools in the early 1950s. He attended the University of Illinois at Urbana-Champaign. While there he worked on the student newspaper and found he had a knack for journalism; he was eventually promoted to editor in chief. After two years at the Chicago campus he transferred to the university's central campus at Urbana-Champaign. He graduated with a degree in journalism in 1958.

After graduation he worked as a proofreader at Time Inc. before becoming an editor for Science Digest. Cohen married Susan Handler, a writer who has worked on the news magazine 60 Minutes, on February 2, 1958. The couple had one child, a daughter, Theodora (September 10, 1968 – December 21, 1988), who graduated from Port Jervis High School and attended Syracuse University at the time of her death.

== Career ==
Cohen was well known for his books about UFOs, ghosts, psychic phenomena, cryptozoology, and the occult. Though Cohen is a self-described skeptic and onetime member of CSICOP, his books on paranormal phenomena take a more light-hearted, open-minded stance.

Cohen wrote about a variety of subjects of interest to young readers, including movies and television, extraterrestrials, and the supernatural. While the majority of Cohen's books deal with the mysterious and otherworldly, he approaches these topics with a certain amount of skepticism. He initially wrote science books for the non-specialist, but had difficulty interesting publishers in these works. In the course of researching his work, Cohen developed a genuine interest in the occult. However, despite having crept around haunted houses, attending séances, and spending a night in a graveyard, he admitted he had never seen a ghost. Though Cohen was intensely interested in the UFO phenomenon, writing several books on the subject, he was an admitted skeptic; he maintains though that the lack of conclusive evidence does not disprove anything.

Cohen and his wife Susan have collaborated on books for teens. Susan's background in sociology helped the couple write Teenage Competition : A Survival Guide and When Someone You Know is Gay. While writing books for a teenage audience, the Cohens were able to understand their audience by paying attention to their daughter's taste in fashion and entertainment. Their most personal book was Pan Am 103: The Bombing, the Betrayals, and a Bereaved Family's Search for Justice (2000), which recounted their dramatically altered lives without their daughter.

Cohen is also the author of the controversial Curses, Hexes and Spells (1974), which has appeared on several "banned books" lists due to its perceived advocacy of magic and witchcraft. Curses, Hexes, and Spells is number 73 on the American Library Association's list of the 100 Most Frequently Challenged Books of 1990–2000. Cohen said he has no problem with a parent telling his or her own child not to read the book, but "when a parent says no child should read the book, it becomes an object of censorship."

== Selected bibliography ==
Daniel Cohen wrote on a variety of subjects in addition to the paranormal: historical and current biographies; advice for teenagers; world history; science and technology; animals and nature; urban legends; and popular television, music, film, and sports personalities. In all, he wrote nearly 200 books. Good Reads shows 209 distinct works.

Some of his titles include: Myths of the Space Age (1967 - his first published book), The World of UFOs (1978), A Close Look at Close Encounters (1981), The Encyclopedia of Monsters (1981), The Great Airship Mystery (1981), How to Test Your ESP (1982), The Encyclopedia of Ghosts (1984), Phone Call from a Ghost (1988), Ghostly Tales of Love and Revenge (1992), and The Ghost of Elvis and Other Celebrity Spirits (1994).

== Pan Am Flight 103 ==
Cohen's daughter, Theodora, died at the age of 20 in the bombing of Pan Am Flight 103. Thirty-eight minutes into its flight from Heathrow to JFK in New York, Pan Am Flight 103 exploded at 31,000 feet over the town of Lockerbie in Scotland, killing 243 passengers, 16 crew members and 11 local residents in their homes. On that flight was the only child of Susan and Dan Cohen, Theodora ("Theo"). Susan Cohen calls December 21, 1988, not only the worst day of her life, but the last day of her life. "I'm not the same person ... There is not a day that will ever go by that is not filled with what happened." The Cohens were perhaps the most vocal activists among the Pan Am 103 families. They cowrote a book about it, entitled Pam Am 103: The Bombing, The Betrayals, and a Bereaved Family's Search for Justice.

They have criticized Pan Am, the U.S. and British governments, and dictator Muammar Gaddafi, who was killed in 2011. Susan Cohen maintains that with Gaddafi's death came the only justice she was ever to receive. A documentary was made about the aftermath of the bombing, titled Since: The Bombing of Pan Am Flight 103. The film follows the Cohens and two other couples in the years since the loss of their children. The Cohens were chosen by filmmaker Phil Furey because they were "outspoken, and angry, and embittered."

In August 2009, the convicted bomber was released on grounds of compassion. Susan Cohen, furious with the sympathy shown for the bomber, said, "You want to feel sorry for anyone, please feel sorry for me, feel sorry for my poor daughter, her body falling a mile through the air".

Daniel and Susan Cohen were featured in the film Since: The Bombing of Pan Am Flight 103. The film's creator, Phil Furey, stated that he selected the Cohens because of their anger and "how honest they were about how this ruined their lives."

== Personal life ==
Cohen lived in Port Jervis, New York, and later Cape May Court House, Middle Township, New Jersey, with his wife, Susan. He died in Cape May, New Jersey in 2018.

Cohen along with Philip J. Klass, James E. Oberg and Ernest H. Taves were founding members of a Committee for Skeptical Inquiry UFO subcommittee. UFO expert Robert Sheaffer writes in his 1981 book UFO Verdict that the subcommittee was "the first ufological group formed by individuals 'not inclined to believe in the literal truth of UFO claims'".
