= Carl Meredith Allen =

American merchant marine (1925–1994)

- Born: May 31, 1925; Springdale, Pennsylvania, U.S.
- Died: March 5, 1994 (aged 68); Greeley, Colorado, U.S.
- Other names: Carlos Miguel Allende; Carlos Miguel Christofero Allende; Karl Merditt Allenstein
- Occupation: Merchant mariner
- Known for: Philadelphia Experiment hoax

Carl Meredith Allen (May 31, 1925 – March 5, 1994) was an American merchant mariner who claimed that during World War II he witnessed the "Philadelphia Experiment," a supposed paranormal event where the United States Navy made a ship invisible and accidentally teleported it through space. The story is widely considered to be a hoax perpetrated by Allen, something he confessed to several times over the years, then recanted, then confessed to again.

== Biography ==
Carl Allen was born on May 31, 1925, in Springdale, Pennsylvania, the eldest of five children. His family described him as brilliant in school with a "fantastic mind" but also as a person who never held any particular job for long and was a drifter. He was also known as a "master leg-puller", pulling pranks on people, and was said by one of his siblings to do "all he could to get out of [school], out of the work". In 1942, he joined the U.S. Marine Corps but was discharged less than a year later. Immediately thereafter, he enlisted in the United States Merchant Marine, at first serving on the SS Andrew Furuseth and then on over two dozen other vessels until 1952 when he left service. Allen would later claim that in 1943, he witnessed an invisibility experiment carried out by the U.S. Navy at the Philadelphia Naval Shipyard (the so-called Philadelphia Experiment), met Albert Einstein there, and was schooled in physics by Einstein over the course of several weeks.

During his lifetime, he would use many aliases including Carlos Miguel Allende, Señor Professor and Colonel Carlos Miguel Christofero Allende, and, on one occasion when he wrote to rocket engineer Wernher von Braun, Dr. Karl Merditt Allenstein. He appeared in various locales, including Colorado, Mexico, and eventually Greeley, Colorado, where he died on March 5, 1994.

== Connection to the Philadelphia Experiment ==
In late 1955, an anonymous package arrived at the U.S. Office of Naval Research (ONR). It contained a copy of Morris K. Jessup's book The Case for the UFO: Unidentified Flying Objects that was filled with handwritten notes in its margins, written with three different shades of blue ink, appearing to detail a debate among three individuals. They discussed ideas about the propulsion for flying saucers, alien races, and expressed concern that Jessup was too close to discovering their technology. When Jessup was invited to the Office of Naval Research a year later and shown the annotated copy of his book, he noticed the handwriting of the annotations resembled a series of letters he received from Carl Allen, who also signed some of his letters "Carlos Miguel Allende". In the letters to Jessup, Allen alleged the existence of a science experiment that was based on unpublished theories by Albert Einstein, which had been put into practice at the Philadelphia Naval Shipyard in October 1943. Allen claimed to have witnessed this experiment while serving aboard the SS Andrew Furuseth. In Allen's account, a destroyer escort was successfully rendered invisible, but the ship inexplicably teleported to Norfolk, Virginia, for several minutes, and then reappeared in the Philadelphia yard. According to the narrative, the ship's crew supposedly suffered various side effects, including mental illness, intangibility, and being "frozen" in place. When Jessup wrote back requesting more information to corroborate his story, Allen said his memory would have to be recovered and referred Jessup to a seemingly non-existent Philadelphia newspaper article that Allen claimed covered the incident.

Twelve years later, Allen would say that he authored all the annotations in order to frighten Jessup.

The Jessup book with Allen's scribbled commentaries gained prominence when the Varo Manufacturing Corporation of Garland, Texas, which did contract work for ONR, began producing mimeographed copies of the book with Allen's annotations and Allen's letters to Jessup, first a dozen and then eventually 127 copies. These copies came to be known as the "Varo edition". This became the heart of many "Philadelphia Experiment" books, documentaries, and movies to come. Over the years, various writers and researchers who tried to get more information from Carl Allen stated that they found his responses elusive, or could not find him at all.

== See also ==
- Fred Crisman, promoter of the Maury Island hoax
- Richard C. Doty and John Lear, promoters of the Dulce Base hoax
- UFO reports and disinformation
