= Philadelphia Experiment =

Supposed 1943 US Navy experiment

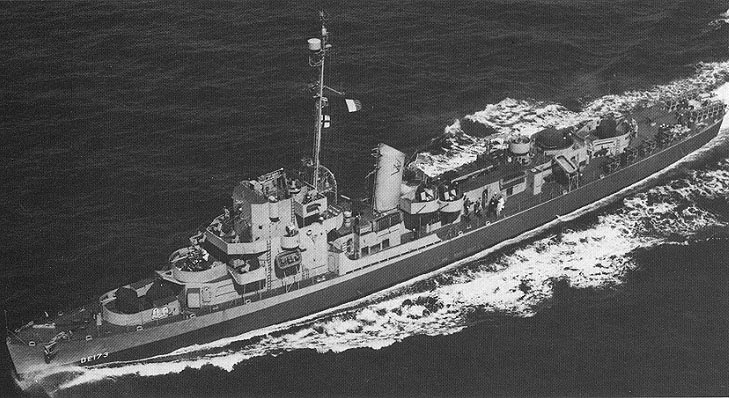
USS Eldridge (DE-173), c. 1944

The Philadelphia Experiment was an alleged event claimed to have been witnessed by an ex-merchant mariner named Carl M. Allen at the United States Navy's Philadelphia Naval Shipyard in Philadelphia, Pennsylvania, United States, some time around October 28, 1943. Allen described an experiment where the U.S. Navy attempted to make a destroyer escort, USS Eldridge, disappear and the bizarre results that followed.

The story surfaced in late 1955 when Allen sent a book full of hand-written annotations referring to the experiment to a U.S. Navy research organization and, a little later, a series of letters making further claims to a UFO author. Allen's account of the event is widely understood to be a hoax.

Several different—and sometimes contradictory—versions of the alleged experiment have circulated over the years in paranormal literature and popular movies. The U.S. Navy maintains that no such experiment was ever conducted, that the details of the story contradict well-established facts about USS Eldridge, and that the physics the experiment is claimed to be based on are non-existent.

== Origins of the story ==
The story of a "Philadelphia Experiment" originated in late 1955 when Carl M. Allen sent an anonymous package marked "Happy Easter" containing a copy of Morris K. Jessup's book The Case for the UFO: Unidentified Flying Objects to the U.S. Office of Naval Research. The book was filled with handwritten notes in its margins, written with three different shades of blue ink, appearing to detail a debate among three individuals, only one of whom is given a name: "Jemi". They commented on Jessup's ideas about the propulsion for flying saucers, discussed alien races, and expressed concern that Jessup was too close to discovering their technology.

The commenters referred to each other as "Gypsies", and discussed two different types of "people" living in outer space. Their text contained non-standard use of capitalization and punctuation, and detailed a lengthy discussion of the merits of various elements of Jessup's assumptions in the book. There were oblique references to the Philadelphia Experiment (one commenter reassures his fellow annotators who have highlighted a certain theory which Jessup advanced).

Shortly thereafter, in January 1956, Allen began sending a series of letters to Jessup, using his given name as well as "Carlos Miguel Allende". The first known letter warned Jessup not to investigate the levitation of unidentified flying objects. Allen put forward a story of dangerous science based on alleged unpublished theories by Albert Einstein. He further claimed a scientist named Franklin Reno put these theories into practice at the Philadelphia Naval Shipyard in October 1943.

Allen claimed to have witnessed this experiment while serving aboard the SS Andrew Furuseth. In Allen's account, a destroyer escort was successfully made invisible, but the ship inexplicably teleported to Norfolk, Virginia, for several minutes, and then reappeared in the Philadelphia yard. The ship's crew was supposed to have suffered various side effects, including insanity, intangibility, and being "frozen" in place. When Jessup wrote back requesting more information to corroborate his story, Allen said his memory would have to be recovered and referred Jessup to what seems to be a non-existent Philadelphia newspaper article that Allen claimed covered the incident.

In 1957, Jessup was invited to the Office of Naval Research where he was shown the annotated copy of his book. Jessup noticed the handwriting of the annotations resembled the letters he received from Allen. (Twelve years later, Allen would say that he authored all of the annotations in order "to scare the hell out of Jessup".)

Two officers at ONR, Captain Sidney Sherby and Commander George W. Hoover, took a personal interest in the matter. Hoover later explained that his duties as Special Projects Officer required him to investigate many publications and that he ultimately found nothing of substance to the alleged invisibility experiment. Hoover discussed the annotations with Austin N. Stanton, president of Varo Manufacturing Corporation of Garland, Texas, during meetings about Varo's contract work for ONR.

Stanton became so interested that Varo's office began producing mimeographed copies of Jessup's book with the annotations and Allen's letters, first a dozen and eventually 127 copies. These copies came to be known as the "Varo edition". Besides noting handwriting of the individual named "Jemi" (addressed as such by the others and using blue-violet ink), the anonymous introduction to the Varo edition concludes that there were two other individuals making annotations, "Mr. A" (identified as Allen by Jessup, in blue ink) and "Mr. B" (in blue-green ink).

Jessup tried to publish more books on the subject of UFOs, but was unsuccessful. He lost his publisher and experienced a succession of downturns in his personal life, and died of suicide in Florida on April 30, 1959.

The various book writers who tried to get more information from Carl Allen found his responses elusive, or could not find him at all. One reporter from Allen's hometown of New Kensington, Pennsylvania, interviewed his family and was handed a pile of documents and books, all scribbled with Allen's annotations. They described Allen as a "fantastic mind", but also a drifter and a "master leg-puller".

=== Repetitions ===
In 1965 Vincent Gaddis published a book of Forteana, titled Invisible Horizons: True Mysteries of the Sea. In it he recounted the story of the experiment from the Varo annotations.

George E. Simpson and Neal R. Burger published a 1978 novel titled Thin Air. In this book, set in the present day, a Naval Investigative Service officer investigates several threads linking wartime invisibility experiments to a conspiracy involving matter transmission technology.

Large-scale popularization of the story came about in 1979 when the author Charles Berlitz, who had written a best selling book on the Bermuda Triangle, and his co-author, ufologist William L. Moore, published The Philadelphia Experiment: Project Invisibility, which purported to be a factual account. The book expanded on stories of bizarre happenings, lost unified field theories by Albert Einstein, and government coverups, all based on the Allende/Allen letters to Jessup.

Moore and Berlitz devoted one of the last chapters in The Philadelphia Experiment: Project Invisibility to "The Force Fields of Townsend Brown", namely the experimenter and then-U.S. Navy technician Thomas Townsend Brown. Paul LaViolette's 2008 book Secrets of Antigravity Propulsion also recounts some mysterious involvement of Townsend Brown.

The story was adapted into a 1984 time travel film called The Philadelphia Experiment, directed by Stewart Raffill. Though only loosely based on the prior accounts of the "Experiment", it served to dramatize the core elements of the original story. In 1989, Alfred Bielek claimed to have been aboard USS Eldridge during the Experiment. Addressing the MUFON Conference in 1990, Bielek asserted that Raffill's film was largely consistent with the events he claimed to have witnessed in 1943. Bielek would later add details to his claims on radio talk shows, conferences, and the Internet.

=== General synopsis ===
Note: Several different, and sometimes contradictory, versions of the alleged experiment have circulated over the years. The following synopsis recounts key story points common to most accounts.

The experiment was allegedly based on an aspect of some unified field theory, a term coined by Albert Einstein to describe a class of potential theories; such theories would aim to describe — mathematically and physically — the interrelated nature of the forces of electromagnetism and gravity.

According to some accounts, unspecified "researchers" thought that a theory of this type would enable using large electrical generators to bend light around an object via refraction, so that the object became completely invisible. The Navy regarded this as of military value and it sponsored the experiment.

Another unattributed version of the story proposes that researchers were preparing magnetic and gravitational measurements of the seafloor to detect anomalies, supposedly based on Einstein's attempts to understand gravity. In this version, there were also related secret experiments in Nazi Germany to find anti-gravity, allegedly led by SS-Obergruppenführer Hans Kammler.

There are no reliable or attributed accounts, but in most accounts of the supposed experiment, USS Eldridge was fitted with the required equipment at the Philadelphia Naval Shipyard. Testing began in the summer of 1943, and it was supposedly successful to a limited extent. One test resulted in Eldridge being rendered nearly invisible with some witnesses reporting a "greenish fog" appearing in its place. Crew members complained of severe nausea afterwards.

Allegedly, when the ship reappeared some sailors were embedded in the metal structures of the ship, including one sailor who ended up on a deck level below where he began and had his hand embedded in the steel hull of the ship as well as some sailors who went "completely bananas". There is also a claim the experiment was altered after that point at the request of the Navy, limiting it to creating a stealth technology that would render USS Eldridge invisible to radar. None of these allegations have been independently substantiated.

Other versions of the story give the date of the experiment as October 28, 1943. In this version, Eldridge not only became invisible, but disappeared from the area and teleported to Norfolk, Virginia, over 200 miles (320 km) away. It is claimed that Eldridge sat for some time in view of men aboard the ship SS Andrew Furuseth, whereupon Eldridge vanished and then reappeared in Philadelphia at the site it had originally occupied.

Many versions of the tale include descriptions of serious side effects for the crew. Some crew members were said to have been physically fused to bulkheads while others suffered from mental disorders, some re-materialized inside out, and still others vanished. It is also claimed that the ship's crew may have been subjected to brainwashing to maintain the secrecy of the experiment.

== Evidence and research ==
The historian Mike Dash notes that many authors who publicized the "Philadelphia Experiment" story after that of Jessup appeared to have conducted little or no research of their own. Through the late 1970s, for example, Allende/Allen was often described as mysterious and difficult to locate, but Goerman determined Allende/Allen's identity after only a few telephone calls.

Others speculate that much of the key literature emphasizes dramatic embellishment rather than pertinent research. Berlitz's and Moore's account of the story (The Philadelphia Experiment: Project Invisibility) claimed to include factual information, such as transcripts of an interview with a scientist involved in the experiment, but their work has also been criticized for plagiarizing key story elements from the novel Thin Air which was published a year earlier.

=== Misunderstanding of documented naval experiments ===
Personnel at the Fourth Naval District have suggested that the alleged event was a misunderstanding of routine research during World War II at the Philadelphia Naval Shipyard. One theory is that "the foundation for the apocryphal stories arose from degaussing experiments which have the effect of making a ship undetectable or 'invisible' to magnetic mines." Another possible origin of the stories about levitation, teleportation, and effects on human crew might be attributed to experiments with the generating plant of the destroyer USS Timmerman (DD-828), wherein a higher-frequency generator produced corona discharges, although none of the crew reported suffering effects from the experiment.

Observers have argued that it is inappropriate to grant credence to an unusual story promoted by one individual in the absence of corroborating evidence. Robert Goerman wrote in Fate magazine in 1980, that "Carlos Allende"/"Carl Allen", who is said to have corresponded with Jessup, was Carl Meredith Allen of New Kensington, Pennsylvania, who had an established history of psychiatric illness and who may have fabricated the primary history of the experiment as a result of his mental illness. Goerman later realized that Allen was a family friend and "a creative and imaginative loner… sending bizarre writings and claims".

=== Timeline inconsistencies ===
USS Eldridge was not commissioned until August 27, 1943, and it remained in port in New York City until September 1943. The October experiment allegedly took place while the ship was on its first shakedown cruise in the Bahamas, which conspiracy theorists try to explain away by claiming that the ship's logs might have been falsified or else still be classified. Conspiracy theorists also attempt to explain away the inconsistency by claiming that USS Hammann (DE-131) was actually used rather than USS Eldridge as USS Hammann arrived in the shipyard on October 20, 1943, ignoring the "eyewitness statements" from Carl M. Allen which launched the hoax in the first place.

The Office of Naval Research (ONR) stated in September 1996, "ONR has never conducted investigations on radar invisibility, either in 1943 or at any other time." Pointing out that the ONR was not established until 1946, it denounces the accounts of "The Philadelphia Experiment" as complete "science fiction".

A reunion of Navy veterans who had served aboard USS Eldridge told a Philadelphia newspaper in April 1999 that their ship had never made port in Philadelphia. Further evidence discounting the Philadelphia Experiment timeline comes from USS Eldridge’s complete World War II action report, including the remarks section of the 1943 deck log, available on microfilm.

=== Alternative explanations ===
Researcher Jacques Vallée describes a procedure on board USS Engstrom, which was docked alongside the Eldridge in 1943. The operation involved the generation of a powerful electromagnetic field on board the ship in order to deperm or degauss it, with the goal of rendering the ship undetectable or "invisible" to magnetically fused undersea mines and torpedoes. This system was invented by a Canadian, Charles F. Goodeve, when he held the rank of commander in the Royal Canadian Naval Volunteer Reserve, and the Royal Navy and other navies used it widely during World War II.

British ships of the era often included such degaussing systems built into the upper decks (the conduits are still visible on the deck of HMS Belfast in London, for example). Degaussing is still used today. However, it has no effect on visible light or radar. Vallée speculates that accounts of USS Engstrom's degaussing might have been garbled and confabulated in subsequent retellings, and that these accounts may have influenced the story of "The Philadelphia Experiment".

Vallée cites a veteran who served on board USS Engstrom and who suggests it might have traveled from Philadelphia to Norfolk and back again in a single day at a time when merchant ships could not, by use of the Chesapeake & Delaware Canal and Chesapeake Bay, which at the time was open only to naval vessels. Use of that channel was kept quiet: German submarines had ravaged shipping along the East Coast during Operation Drumbeat, and thus military ships unable to protect themselves were secretly moved via canals to avoid the threat.

The same veteran claims to be the man that Allende witnessed "disappearing" at a bar. He claims that when a fight broke out, friendly barmaids whisked him out of the bar before the police arrived, because he was under age for drinking. They then covered for him by claiming that he had disappeared.

== See also ==
- Fred Crisman, promoter of the Maury Island hoax
- Richard C. Doty and John Lear, promoters of the Dulce Base hoax
- UFO reports and disinformation
- Mirage Men, Paul Bennewitz
- Diffused lighting camouflage, a prototype Royal Canadian Navy counter-illumination system for ships
- List of conspiracy theories
- Montauk Project
- Yehudi lights, a prototype US Navy counter-illumination system for aircraft
