= David Francis Raine =

British (Bermudian) teacher, historian, author, and town counsellor

- Born: David Francis Raine; 1948
- Died: 2004 (aged 55–56); Bermuda
- Education: University of Maryland
- Occupations: teacher, historian, author, and St. George's town counsellor

David Francis Raine (1948–2004) was a Bermudan educator and writer. He was a St. George's town councillor, historian and former teacher who authored 13 books and numerous articles, particularly on the subject of the history of Bermuda.

== Books ==
=== Non-fiction ===
- 1980: Pitseolak: A Canadian Tragedy. ISBN 9789997571830
- 1971: The Historic Towne of St. George Bermuda. ASIN B0007ANC4Y
- 1984: Sir George Somers: A Man and his Times. ISBN 9780921962106
- 1986: Bermuda As It Used To Be. ASIN B000GP3QB4
- 1992: Rattle and Shake: The Story of the Bermuda Railway. ISBN 9780921962113
- 1994: The Imprisoned Splendour: The Life and Work of Sam Morse-Brown. 9780921962090
- 1996: Architecture: Bermuda Style. ASIN B0007JD182
- 1997: Solved!: The Greatest Sea Mystery of All. ISBN 9780921962151.
- 2005: The Magic of Bermuda. ISBN 9781843309390
