= The Bermuda Triangle (book) =

1974 book by Charles Berlitz

- The cover of the 1977 Panther paperback edition
- Author: Charles Berlitz
- Publication date: 1974

The Bermuda Triangle is a best-selling 1974 book by Charles Berlitz which popularized the belief of the Bermuda Triangle as an area of ocean prone to disappearing ships and airplanes. The book sold nearly 20 million copies in 30 languages.

In the book, Berlitz elaborates upon several theories for the purported disappearances. One of those theories states that the Bermuda Triangle was actually a by-product of the destruction of Atlantis.

The book was the subject of criticism in Larry Kusche's 1975 work The Bermuda Triangle Mystery—Solved, in which Kusche cites errors in the reports of missing ships, and has also said "If Berlitz were to report that a boat were red, the chance of it being some other color is almost a certainty."

The book was produced with the collaboration of J. Manson Valentine, who provided photos and illustrations. It was later the basis for a theatrical film of René Cardona Jr. released in 1978 and a Sunn Classic Pictures documentary by Richard Friedenberg released in 1979.
