= Charles Berlitz =

American linguist, writer and CIC agent (1914–2003)

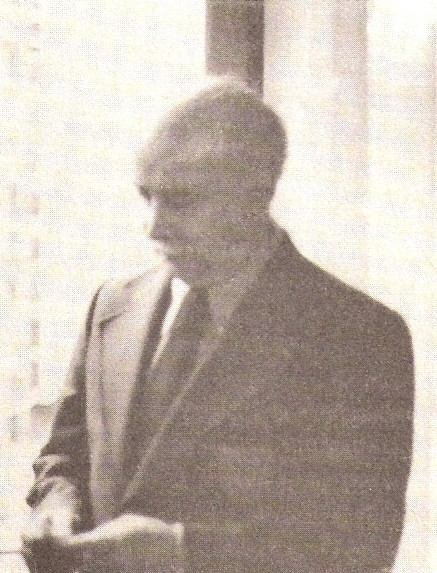
- Berlitz in 1979
- Born: November 22, 1914; New York City, New York, USA
- Died: December 18, 2003 (aged 89); Tamarac, Florida, USA
- Other name: Charles L. Frambach-Berlitz
- Education: Yale University
- Occupations: Linguist; writer; CIC agent; publisher
- Notable work: The Bermuda Triangle (1974)
- Spouse: Valerie Seary (m. 1950)
- Children: 2
- Relatives: Maximilian Berlitz (grandfather)

Charles L. Frambach Berlitz (Note: Also cited as Frambach-Berlitz.) (né Frambach; November 22, 1914 – December 18, 2003) was an American linguist, writer, CIC agent, publisher and polyglot. A writer on language learning and paranormal phenomena, Berlitz is known for his 1974 work The Bermuda Triangle.

== Early life and education ==
Berlitz was born Charles L. Frambach on November 22, 1914, in New York City to Charles L. Frambach and Millicent Frambach née Berlitz). (Note: Also cited as Melicent Frambach.) The maternal grandson of Maximilian Berlitz, a linguist, language teacher, writer and founder of Berlitz Language Schools, his grandfather later requested that Berlitz be given his last name.

As a child, Charles was raised in a household in which (by his father's orders) every relative and servant spoke to Charles in a different language: he reached adolescence speaking eight languages fluently. In adulthood, he recalled having had the childhood delusion that every human being spoke a different language, wondering why he did not have his own language like everyone else in his household. His father spoke to him in German, his grandfather in Russian, and his nanny in Spanish.

He began working for the family language school, The Berlitz School of Languages, during college breaks. He graduated magna cum laude from Yale University.

== Career ==
During World War 2, Berlitz served as a CIC agent. The publishing house, of which he was vice president, sold, among other things, tourist phrase books and pocket dictionaries, several of which he authored. He also played a key role in developing record and tape language courses. He left the company in the late 1960s, not long after he sold the company to publishing firm Crowell, Collier & Macmillan.

Berlitz was a writer on paranormal phenomena. He wrote a number of books on Atlantis. In his book The Mystery of Atlantis, he claimed Atlantis was real, based on his interpretation of geophysics, psychic studies, classical literature, tribal lore, and archeology. He also attempted to link the Bermuda Triangle to Atlantis. He claimed to have located Atlantis undersea in the area of the Bermuda Triangle. He was also an ancient astronaut proponent who believed that extraterrestrials had visited Earth.

Berlitz spent 13 years on active duty in the U.S. Army, mostly in intelligence. In 1950, he married Valerie Seary, with whom he had two children, a daughter Lin, and son, Marc. He died in 2003 at the age of 89 at University Hospital in Tamarac, Florida.

== Reception ==
Berlitz's statements about the Bermuda Triangle and the Philadelphia Experiment were heavily criticized by researchers and scientists for their inaccuracy. He has also drawn criticism for ignoring possible natural explanations and promoting pseudoscientific ideas. Larry Kusche has accused Berlitz of fabricating evidence and inventing mysteries that have no basis in fact.

== See also ==
- Berlitz International

== Bibliography ==
=== Anomalous phenomena ===
- The mystery of Atlantis, 1969
- Mysteries from forgotten worlds, 1972
- The Bermuda triangle, 1974, ISBN 0-285-63326-0
- Without a trace, 1977
- The Philadelphia experiment – Project Invisibility, 1979
- The Roswell Incident, 1980
- Doomsday 1999 A.D., 1981, ISBN 0-586-05543-6
- Atlantis - The eighth continent: G. P. Putnams Sons, New York, 1984
- Atlantis: The Lost Continent Revealed, Macmillan, London, 1984
- The lost ship of Noah: In search of the ark at Ararat, 1987
- World of the incredible but true: Ballantine Books, New York, 1988
- The dragon's triangle, 1989
- World of Strange Phenomena: Little Brown & Company, New York, 1995

=== Language ===
- Native Tongues, 1982
