= Larry Kusche =

American investigator of the Bermuda Triangle

Larry David Kusche
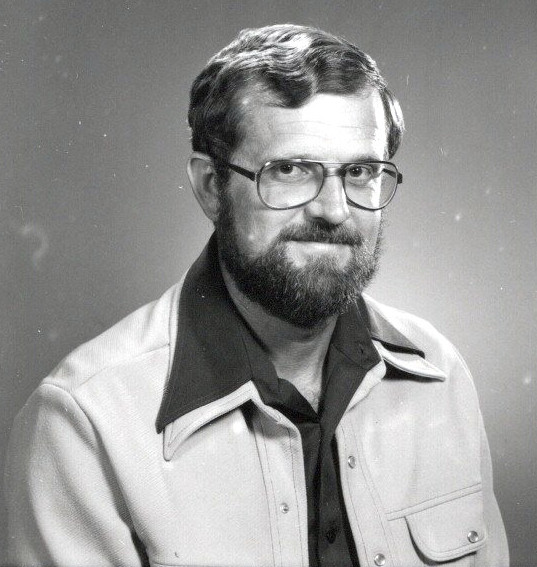
- Kusche in 1975
- Born: Lawrence David Kusche; November 1, 1940; Racine, Wisconsin
- Died: July 22, 2024 (aged 83)
- Other name: Larry
- Education: Arizona State University
- Occupation: Writer
- Spouse: Sally Jo Rhodes
- Writing career
- Language: English
- Genre: Skepticism
- Notable work: The Bermuda Triangle Mystery – Solved
- Notable awards: CSI Fellow

Lawrence David Kusche (November 1, 1940 — July 22, 2024) was an American author, research librarian, and pilot. He investigated unexplained disappearances and other unusual events related to the Bermuda Triangle to answer queries he was getting as a research librarian. He eventually wrote a book debunking most of the mysteries touted by other writers about that location.

== Early life and education ==
Kusche was born in Wisconsin, and his family moved to the Arizona area when he was six. Interested in aviation, Kusche qualified for a commercial pilot's license at age 19, was a commercial pilot by age 21, a flight instructor by age 24, and an instrument instructor.

== Career ==
In 1964, Kusche graduated from Arizona State University (ASU). He completed a training course to become a commercial flight engineer, but, as he told the Tucson Daily Citizen in 1975, "I decided I didn't like it, so the day I was supposed to report for work, I resigned and came back to Arizona. I just didn't like being an engineer, the guy with hundreds and hundreds of instruments and controls. You really can't see out of the airplane." He returned to Arizona to become a high school math teacher and librarian. Later, he acquired a master's degree in library science and began working at ASU's Hayden Library in June 1969.

Kusche took a leave-of-absence from ASU to finish his first book. After the success of the Bermuda Triangle book, Kusche left his career as a librarian to become a writer. He has worked as a technical writer in the Phoenix area. After the publication of his investigative books, Kusche became a fellow of the Committee for Skeptical Inquiry (CSI).

== Books ==
=== Bermuda Triangle ===
As a research librarian at Arizona State University, Kusche got queries for all types of information from students writing term papers. In the early 1970s, he became interested in the Bermuda Triangle mystery, as he was confronted by numerous queries related to the Triangle. This prompted Kusche and fellow librarian Debbie Blouin to start gathering information, mostly by writing hundreds of letters to request information from official sources. Initially, the two librarians began selling (for $2) a bibliography of the information about the Bermuda Triangle that they had acquired. Later, it occurred to Kusche that somebody should put down all of the information they had gathered into a book. When the publishing company Harper and Row ordered a copy of the bibliography, Kusche sent them a copy with a note scribbled on it asking if they were interested in a book about the subject that he was writing – and they were.

Initially intrigued by the mysteries surrounding the Triangle, Kusche's research convinced him that virtually all the incidents had been caused by storms or accidents, or they happened outside the Triangle, or no proof could be found that they ever occurred at all. His conclusion was that the Triangle was a "manufactured mystery," the result of poor research and reporting, and the occasional deliberate falsification of facts.

=== The Disappearance of Flight 19 ===
Kusche originally included a long chapter in his Bermuda Triangle book about Flight 19, five Navy Avenger torpedo airplanes on a training mission out of Fort Lauderdale Naval Air Station that disappeared in the Atlantic Ocean on December 5, 1945. Kusche later expanded this chapter into a book, The Disappearance of Flight 19. He studied the Navy's report of the investigation, interviewed many of the Navy personnel who were involved at the time, and flew the likely route of the missing aircraft himself. At the time, the lost flight of five torpedo bombers was said to be a victim of the mysterious forces in the Triangle. Kusche explained why the flight leader erroneously thought he was in the Florida Keys, why he said his compass had failed, and why no wreckage has yet been found.

=== Other books ===
Kusche is the author of Larry Kusche's Popcorn Cookery, a 1977 cookbook detailing recipes involving popcorn, including baked goods made from ground-up popcorn "flour", and Shape Up Your Hips and Thighs.

== Bibliography ==
- The Bermuda Triangle Mystery – Solved (ISBN 0450028615) (1975)
- Larry Kusche's Popcorn Cookery (ISBN 091265662X) (1977)
- Shape Up Your Hips and Thighs (ISBN 0020591004) (1979)
- The Disappearance of Flight 19 (ISBN 0060124776) (1980)
