= Bermuda Triangle =

Urban legend based on a region in North Atlantic

- Devil's Triangle
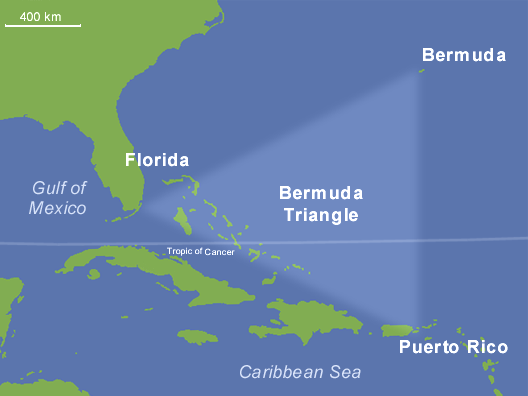
- Map of the Bermuda Triangle area
- Interactive map of Bermuda Triangle
- Coordinates: 25°N 71°W

The Bermuda Triangle, also known as the Devil's Triangle, is a loosely defined region in the North Atlantic Ocean, roughly bounded by Florida, Bermuda, and Puerto Rico. Since the mid-20th century, it has been the focus of an urban legend suggesting that many aircraft, ships, and people have disappeared there under mysterious circumstances. However, extensive investigations by reputable sources, including the U.S. federal government and scientific organizations, have found no evidence of unusual activity, attributing reported incidents to natural phenomena, human error, and misinterpretation.

== Origins ==
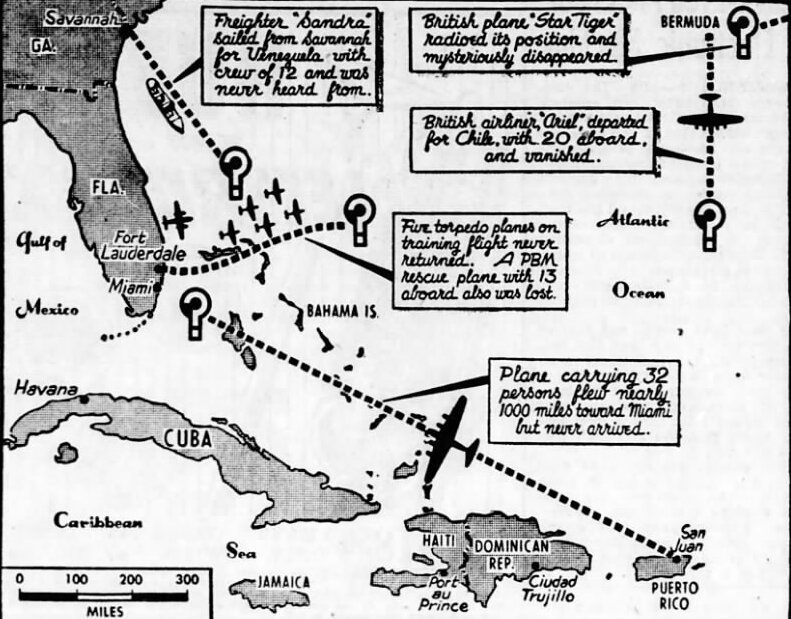
Map that was published in various newspapers with the Associated Press article of 17 September 1950

Although the nearby Sargasso Sea already had a reputation as a mysterious region where ships may become lost, the earliest suggestion of unusual disappearances in the Bermuda area appeared in an article written by Edward Van Winkle Jones of the Miami Herald that was distributed by the Associated Press and appeared in various American newspapers on 17 September 1950.

Two years later, Fate magazine published "Sea Mystery at Our Back Door": a short article, by George X. Sand, that was the first to lay out the now-familiar triangular area where the losses took place. Sand recounted the loss of several planes and ships since World War II: the disappearance of Sandra, a tramp steamer; (Note: Sandra disappeared in April 1950; a wreck consistent with its size and cargo was discovered in 2020.) the December 1945 loss of Flight 19, a group of five US Navy torpedo bombers on a training mission; the March 1948 disappearance of a fishing skiff with three men, including jockey Albert Snider; (Note: Sand's article refers to jockey Albert Snider as Al Snyder, and includes this disappearance although it occurred southwest of Miami in Florida Bay.) the December 1948 disappearance of an Airborne Transport DC-3 charter flight en route from Puerto Rico to Miami; and the January 1949 disappearance of Star Ariel, (Note: Sand's article refers to Star Ariel as Aerial.) another BSAA passenger airplane.

Flight 19 was covered again in the April 1962 issue of The American Legion Magazine. In it, author Allan W. Eckert wrote that the flight leader had been heard saying, "We cannot be sure of any direction ... everything is wrong ... strange ... the ocean doesn't look as it should." In February 1964, Vincent Gaddis wrote an article called "The Deadly Bermuda Triangle" in Argosy saying Flight 19 and other disappearances were part of a pattern of strange events in the region, dating back to at least 1840. The next year, Gaddis expanded this article into a book, Invisible Horizons.

Other writers elaborated on Gaddis' ideas, including John Wallace Spencer (Limbo of the Lost, 1969, repr. 1973); Charles Berlitz (The Bermuda Triangle, 1974); and Richard Winer (The Devil's Triangle, 1974). Various of these authors incorporated supernatural elements.

== Triangle area ==
Sand's article in Fate described the area as "a watery triangle bounded roughly by Florida, Bermuda and Puerto Rico". The Argosy article by Gaddis further delineated the boundaries, giving its vertices as Miami, San Juan, and Bermuda. Subsequent writers did not necessarily follow this definition. Some writers gave different boundaries and vertices to the triangle, with the total area varying from 1.3 to 3.9 million km^{2} (0.50 to 1.51 million sq mi), in some cases expanding the boundary of the triangle as far as the coast of Ireland. Consequently, the determination of which accidents occurred inside the triangle depends on which writer reported them.

== Criticism of the concept ==
=== Larry Kusche ===
Larry Kusche, author of The Bermuda Triangle Mystery: Solved (1975), argued that many claims of Gaddis and subsequent writers were exaggerated, dubious or unverifiable. Kusche's research revealed a number of inaccuracies and inconsistencies between Berlitz's accounts and statements from eyewitnesses, participants, and others involved in the initial incidents. Kusche noted cases where pertinent information went unreported, such as the disappearance of round-the-world yachtsman Donald Crowhurst, which Berlitz had presented as a mystery, despite clear evidence to the contrary. Another example was the ore-carrier recounted by Berlitz as lost without trace three days out of an Atlantic port when in fact it had been lost three days out of a port with the same name in the Pacific Ocean. Kusche also argued that a large percentage of the incidents that sparked allegations of the Triangle's mysterious influence actually occurred well outside it. Often his research was simple: he would review period newspapers of the dates of reported incidents and find reports on possibly relevant events, like unusual weather, that were never mentioned in the disappearance stories.

Kusche concluded:

- The number of ships and aircraft reported missing in the area was not significantly greater, proportionally speaking, than in any other part of the ocean.
- In an area prone to tropical cyclones, the number of disappearances that did occur were, for the most part, not disproportionate, unlikely, or mysterious.
- Berlitz and other writers often failed to mention such storms and sometimes even represented the disappearance as having happened in calm conditions when meteorological records clearly contradict this.
- The numbers themselves had been exaggerated by sloppy research. A boat's disappearance, for example, would be reported, but its eventual (if belated) return to port may not have been.
- Some alleged disappearances were, in reality, not mysterious. Berlitz found that one plane believed to have disappeared in 1937 had, in fact, crashed off Daytona Beach, Florida, in front of hundreds of witnesses.
- The legend of the Bermuda Triangle is a manufactured mystery, perpetuated by writers who either purposely or unknowingly made use of misconceptions, faulty reasoning, sensationalism and hoaxes.

=== Further responses ===
When the British Channel 4 television program The Bermuda Triangle (1992) was being produced by John Simmons of Geofilms for the Equinox series, the marine insurance market Lloyd's of London was asked if an unusually large number of ships had sunk in the Bermuda Triangle area. Lloyd's determined that large numbers of ships had not sunk there. Lloyd's does not charge higher rates for passing through this area. United States Coast Guard records confirm their conclusion. In fact, the number of supposed disappearances is relatively insignificant considering the number of ships and aircraft that pass through on a regular basis.

The Coast Guard is also officially skeptical of the Triangle, noting that they collect and publish, through their inquiries, much documentation contradicting many of the incidents written about by the Triangle authors. In one such incident involving the 1972 explosion and sinking of the tanker V. A. Fogg, the Coast Guard photographed the wreck and recovered several bodies, in contrast with one Triangle author's claim that all the bodies had vanished, with the exception of the captain, who was found sitting in his cabin at his desk, clutching a coffee cup. In addition, V. A. Fogg sank off the coast of Texas, nowhere near the commonly accepted boundaries of the Triangle.

Nova/Horizon aired the episode "The Case of the Bermuda Triangle" on 27 June 1976. The episode was highly critical, stating that "When we've gone back to the original sources or the people involved, the mystery evaporates. Science does not have to answer questions about the Triangle because those questions are not valid in the first place [...] Ships and planes behave in the Triangle the same way they behave everywhere else in the world."

Skeptical researchers, such as Ernest Taves and Barry Singer, have noted how mysteries and the paranormal are very popular and profitable. This has led to the production of vast amounts of material on topics such as the Bermuda Triangle. They were able to show that some of the pro-paranormal material is often misleading or inaccurate, but its producers continue to market it. Accordingly, they have claimed that the market is biased in favor of books, TV specials, and other media that support the Triangle mystery, and against well-researched material if it espouses a skeptical viewpoint.

In a 2013 study, the World Wide Fund for Nature identified the world's 10 most dangerous waters for shipping, but the Bermuda Triangle was not among them.

Benjamin Radford, an author and scientific paranormal investigator, noted in an interview on the Bermuda Triangle that it could be very difficult to locate an aircraft lost at sea due to the vast search area, and although the disappearance might be mysterious, that did not make it paranormal or unexplainable. Radford further noted the importance of double-checking information as the mystery surrounding the Bermuda Triangle had been created by people who had neglected to do so.

NOAA attributes most Bermuda Triangle disappearances to environmental factors such as hurricanes, sudden weather shifts from the Gulf Stream, and hazardous shallow waters. The U.S. Navy dismisses supernatural claims, emphasizing natural causes and human error. Additionally, the U.S. Board on Geographic Names does not list the Bermuda Triangle as an official location, given the lack of evidence distinguishing it from other ocean regions.

In the 2010s and 2020s, scientists and researchers have reiterated that the Bermuda Triangle does not exhibit higher rates of disappearances than other heavily traveled ocean regions. Australian scientist Karl Kruszelnicki told The Independent in 2017 that the "mystery" can be explained by human error, unpredictable weather, and the sheer volume of traffic passing through the area. According to Kruszelnicki, "On a percentage basis, the number of accidents in the Bermuda Triangle is the same as anywhere else in the world."

== Hypothetical explanation attempts ==
Those accepting the Bermuda Triangle as a real phenomenon have suggested a number of explanations.

=== Paranormal explanations ===
Triangle writers have used a number of supernatural concepts to explain the events. One explanation pins the blame on leftover technology from the mythical lost city of Atlantis. Sometimes connected to the Plato's Atlantis story is the submerged rock formation known as the Bimini Road off the island of Bimini in the Bahamas, which is in the Triangle by some definitions. Followers of the purported psychic Edgar Cayce take his prediction that evidence of Atlantis would be found in 1968 as referring to the discovery of the Bimini Road. Believers describe the formation as a road, wall, or other structure, but the Bimini Road is of natural origin.

Some hypothesize that a parallel universe exists in the Bermuda Triangle region, causing a time/space warp that sucks the objects around it into a parallel universe. Others attribute the events to UFOs. Charles Berlitz, author of various books on anomalous phenomena, lists several theories attributing the losses in the Triangle to anomalous or unexplained forces.

=== Natural explanations ===
==== Compass variations ====
Compass issues are frequently cited in accounts of Bermuda Triangle incidents. While some have theorized that unusual local magnetic anomalies may exist in the area, such anomalies have not been found. Compasses have natural magnetic variations in relation to the magnetic poles, a fact navigators have known for centuries. Only for a small number of places are magnetic (compass) north and geographic (true) north exactly the same— in the United States, for example, as of 2000, magnetic north and true north will appear to be the same in only those places located along a line running from Wisconsin to the Gulf of Mexico. Members of the public who are unaware of this, however, may think there is something mysterious about a compass "changing" across an area as large as the Triangle, which it naturally will.

==== Gulf Stream ====
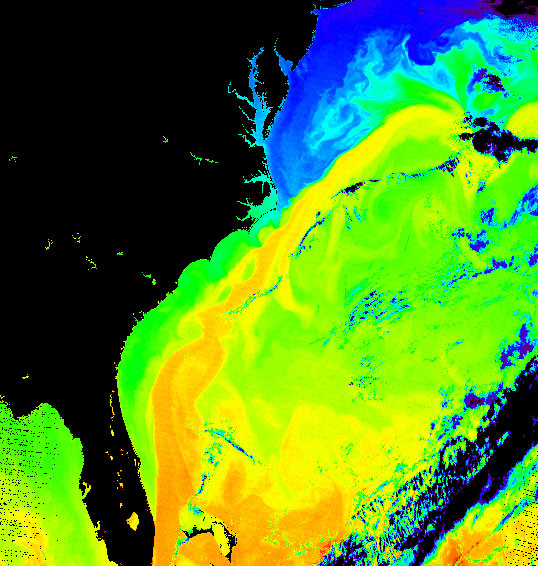
False-color image of the Gulf Stream flowing north through the western Atlantic Ocean (NASA)

The Gulf Stream (Florida Current) is a major surface current, primarily driven by thermohaline circulation that originates in the Gulf of Mexico and then flows through the Straits of Florida into the North Atlantic. In essence, it is a river within an ocean, and, like a river, it can and does carry floating objects. It has a maximum surface velocity of about 2 m/s (6.6 ft/s). A small plane making a water landing or a boat having engine trouble can be carried away from its reported position by the current.

==== Human error ====
One of the most cited explanations in official inquiries as to the loss of any aircraft or vessel is human error. Human stubbornness may have caused businessman Harvey Conover to lose his sailing yacht, Revonoc, as he sailed into the teeth of a storm south of Florida on 1 January 1958.

==== Violent weather ====
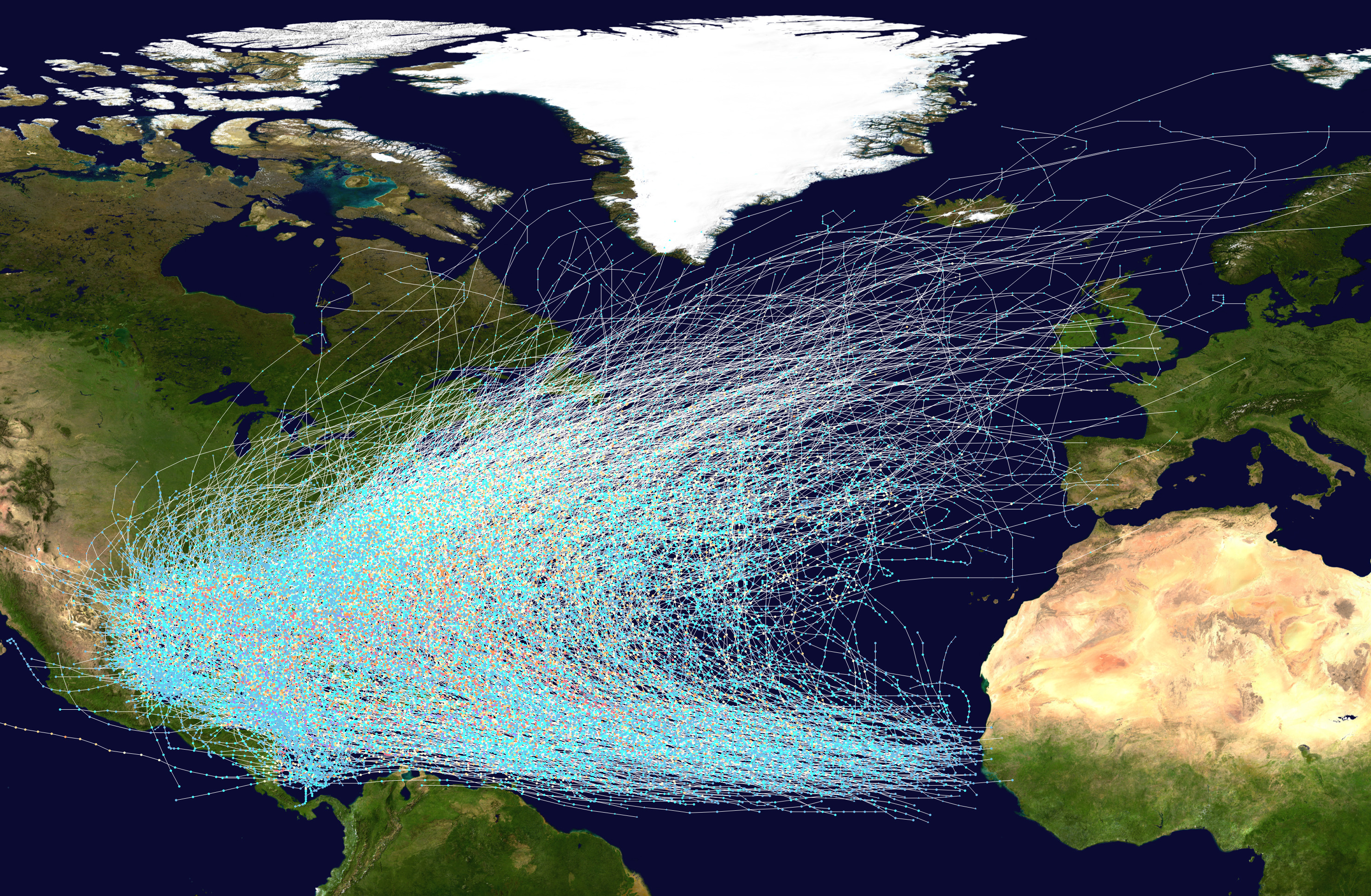
Tracks of all known Atlantic hurricanes between 1851 and 2019. Many storms pass through the Bermuda Triangle.

Hurricanes are powerful storms which form in tropical waters and have cost thousands of lives and caused billions of dollars in damage. The sinking of Francisco de Bobadilla's Spanish fleet in 1502 was the first recorded instance of a destructive hurricane. These storms have caused a number of incidents related to the Triangle. Many Atlantic hurricanes pass through the Triangle as they recurve off the Eastern Seaboard, and, before the advent of weather satellites, ships often had little to no warning of a hurricane's approach.

A powerful downdraft of cold air was suspected to be a cause in the sinking of Pride of Baltimore on 14 May 1986. The crew of the sunken vessel noted the wind suddenly shifted and increased velocity from 32 km/h (20 mph) to 97–145 km/h (60–90 mph). A National Hurricane Center satellite specialist, James Lushine, stated "during very unstable weather conditions the downburst of cold air from aloft can hit the surface like a bomb, exploding outward like a giant squall line of wind and water."

==== Methane hydrates ====
Worldwide distribution of confirmed or inferred offshore gas hydrate-bearing sediments, 1996. Source: United States Geological Survey

An explanation for some of the disappearances has focused on the presence of large fields of methane hydrates (a form of natural gas) on the continental shelves. Laboratory experiments carried out in Australia have proven that bubbles can, indeed, sink a scale model ship by decreasing the density of the water, and any wreckage would be deposited on the ocean floor or rapidly dispersed by the Gulf Stream. It has been hypothesized that periodic methane eruptions (sometimes called "mud volcanoes") may produce regions of frothy water that are no longer capable of providing adequate buoyancy for ships. If this were the case, such an area forming around a ship could cause it to sink very rapidly and without warning.

Publications by the USGS describe large stores of undersea hydrates worldwide, including the Blake Ridge area, off the coast of the southeastern United States. However, according to the USGS, no large releases of gas hydrates are believed to have occurred in the Bermuda Triangle for the past 15,000 years.

== Notable incidents ==
=== HMS Atalanta ===
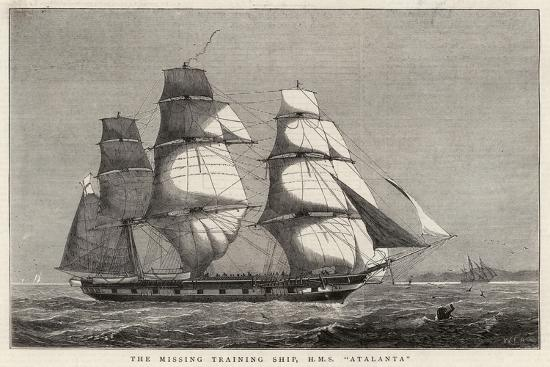
HMS Atalanta. The Graphic, 1880

The sail training ship HMS Atalanta (originally named HMS Juno) disappeared with her entire crew after setting sail from the Royal Naval Dockyard, Bermuda for Falmouth, England, on 31 January 1880. It was presumed that she sank in a powerful storm which crossed her route a couple of weeks after she sailed, and that her crew's being composed primarily of inexperienced trainees may have been a contributing factor. The search for evidence of her fate attracted worldwide attention at the time (connection is also often made to the 1878 loss of the training ship HMS Eurydice, which foundered after departing the Royal Naval Dockyard in Bermuda for Portsmouth on 6 March), and she was alleged decades later to have been a victim of the mysterious triangle, an allegation resoundingly refuted by the research of author David Francis Raine in 1997.

=== USS Cyclops ===
The incident resulting in the single largest loss of life in the history of the US Navy not related to combat occurred when the collier Cyclops, carrying a full load of manganese ore and with one engine out of action, went missing without a trace with a crew of 306 sometime after 4 March 1918, after departing the island of Barbados in the West Indies. Although there is no strong evidence for any single theory, many independent theories exist, some blaming storms, some capsizing, and some suggesting that wartime enemy activity was to blame for the loss. In addition, two of Cyclops's sister ships, Proteus and Nereus, were subsequently lost in the North Atlantic during World War II. Both ships were transporting heavy loads of metallic ore similar to that which was loaded on Cyclops during her fatal voyage. In all three cases structural failure due to overloading with a much denser cargo than designed is considered the most likely cause of sinking.

=== Carroll A. Deering ===
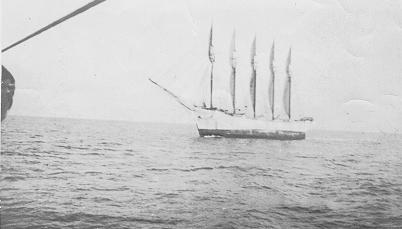
The schooner Carroll A. Deering, as seen from the Cape Lookout lightvessel on 29 January 1921, two days before she was found deserted in North Carolina (US Coast Guard)

Carroll A. Deering, a five-masted schooner built in 1919, was found hard aground and abandoned at Diamond Shoals, near Cape Hatteras, North Carolina, on 31 January 1921. FBI investigation into the Deering scrutinized, then ruled out, multiple theories as to why and how the ship was abandoned, including piracy, sabotage and the involvement of rum-runners.

=== SS Cotopaxi ===
On 29 November 1925, Cotopaxi departed Charleston, for Havana, under Captain W. J. Meyer, with a cargo of coal and 32 crew. On 1 December, Cotopaxi radioed a distress call reporting that the ship was listing and taking on water during a tropical storm. The ship was officially listed as overdue on 31 December. The wreck of Cotopaxi lies 35 nmi (65 km; 40 mi) off St. Augustine, Florida. She was discovered in the 1980s, but could not be identified, and subsequently dubbed the "Bear Wreck". Cotopaxi was identified in January 2020, based on 15 years of investigation by marine biologist Michael Barnette.

In the 1977 science fiction drama film Close Encounters of the Third Kind, Cotopaxi is connected to the legend of the Bermuda Triangle, and is discovered in the Gobi Desert, presumably set there by extraterrestrial forces.

=== Flight 19 ===
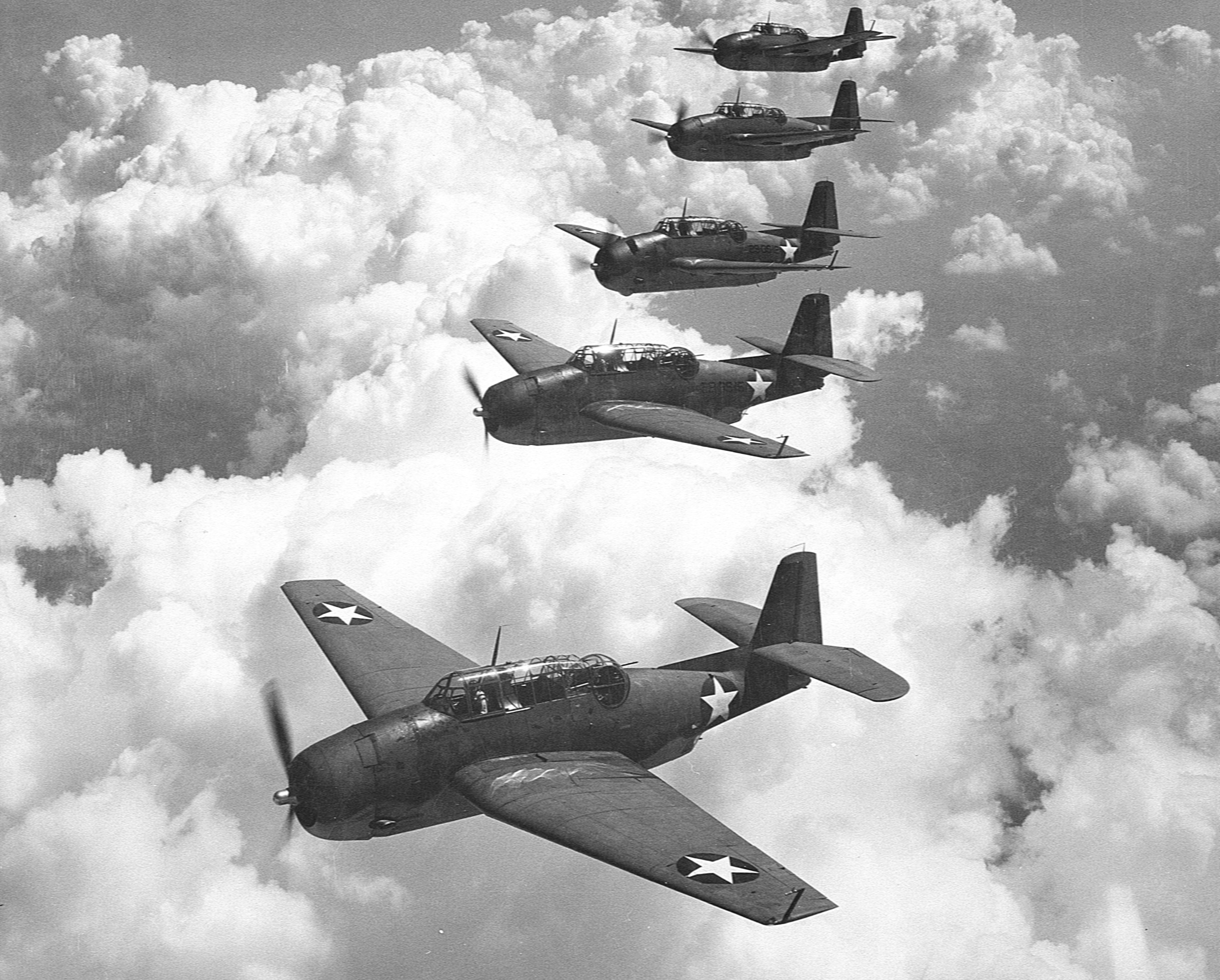
US Navy Avengers, similar to those of Flight 19

Flight 19 was a training flight of five Grumman TBM Avenger torpedo bombers that disappeared on 5 December 1945, while over the Atlantic. The squadron's flight plan was scheduled to take them due east from Fort Lauderdale for 141 mi (227 km), north for 73 mi (117 km), and then back over a final 140 mi (225 km) leg to complete the exercise. The flight never returned to base. The disappearance was attributed by Navy investigators to navigational error leading to the aircraft's running out of fuel.

One of the search-and-rescue aircraft deployed to look for them, a PBM Mariner with a 13-man crew, also disappeared. A tanker off the coast of Florida reported seeing an explosion and observing a widespread oil slick when fruitlessly searching for survivors. The weather was becoming stormy by the end of the incident. According to contemporaneous sources, the Mariner had a history of explosions due to vapor leaks when heavily loaded with fuel, as it might have been for a potentially long search-and-rescue operation.

=== Star Tiger and Star Ariel ===
G-AHNP Star Tiger disappeared on 30 January 1948, on a flight from the Azores to Bermuda; G-AGRE Star Ariel disappeared on 17 January 1949, on a flight from Bermuda to Kingston, Jamaica. Both were Avro Tudor IV passenger aircraft operated by British South American Airways. Both planes were operating at the very limits of their range and the slightest error or fault in the equipment could keep them from reaching the small island.

=== Douglas DC-3 ===
On 28 December 1948, a Douglas DC-3 aircraft, number NC16002, disappeared while on a flight from San Juan, Puerto Rico, to Miami. No trace of the aircraft, or the 32 people on board, was ever found. A Civil Aeronautics Board investigation found there was insufficient information available on which to determine the probable cause of the disappearance.

=== Connemara IV ===
A pleasure yacht was found adrift in the Atlantic south of Bermuda on 26 September 1955; it is usually stated in the stories (Berlitz, Winer) that the crew vanished while the yacht survived being at sea during three hurricanes. The 1955 Atlantic hurricane season shows Hurricane Ione passing nearby between 14 and 18 September, with Bermuda being affected by winds of almost gale force. In his second book on the Bermuda Triangle, Winer quoted from a letter he had received from Mr J.E. Challenor of Barbados:

On the morning of September 22, Connemara IV was lying to a heavy mooring in the open roadstead of Carlisle Bay. Because of the approaching hurricane, the owner strengthened the mooring ropes and put out two additional anchors. There was little else he could do, as the exposed mooring was the only available anchorage. ... In Carlisle Bay, the sea in the wake of Hurricane Janet was awe-inspiring and dangerous. The owner of Connemara IV observed that she had disappeared. An investigation revealed that she had dragged her moorings and gone to sea.

=== KC-135 Stratotankers ===
On 28 August 1963, a pair of US Air Force KC-135 Stratotanker aircraft collided and crashed into the Atlantic 300 miles (480 km) west of Bermuda. Some writers say that while the two aircraft did collide, there were two distinct crash sites, separated by over 160 miles (260 km) of water. However, Kusche's research showed that the unclassified version of the Air Force investigation report revealed that the debris field defining the second "crash site" was examined by a search and rescue ship, and found to be a mass of seaweed and driftwood tangled in an old buoy.

== In popular culture ==
- Heroes Are Hard to Find, 1974 Fleetwood Mac album featuring a track about the mysterious disappearances
- Satan's Triangle, 1975 made-for-television mystery horror film
- Milton Bradley's "Bermuda Triangle", 1976 board game
- "The Bermuda Triangle", 1976 episode of In Search of...
- Airport '77, the 1977 installment of the Airport film series features hijackers who stage a Triangle disappearance
- Close Encounters of the Third Kind, 1977 sci-fi drama film begins with the recovery of Flight 19 from Mexico's Sonoran Desert/ Bermuda Triangle pilots return at the end of the film. The SS Cotopaxi is similarly recovered from the Gobi desert.
- The Fantastic Journey, 1977 sci-fi TV series depicts the Triangle as a portal across time and space.
- "Bermuda Triangle Crisis", 1977 episode of Wonder Woman
- "A Creepy Tangle in the Bermuda Triangle", 1978 episode of The Scooby-Doo Show features a flying saucer hijacking an airplane
- The Bermuda Triangle (film), 1978 Mexican-Italian science fiction horror film
- The Island (1980 film), action adventure-horror film
- "Bermuda Triangle (song)", 1980 Barry Manilow song expressing fear about traveling to the triangle
- The 13 Ghosts of Scooby-Doo, 1985 series where the heroes are tricked into travelling to the Triangle
- "Elvis is Everywhere", 1987 satirical song that links Elvis to a variety of supposed unexplained phenomenon
- "Ghost Ship", 1992 episode of Quantum Leap centered around the Triangle disappearances
- "The Package", 1996 Seinfeld episode in which characters speculate the 1995 Alien Autopsy footage led to decreased media interest in the Triangle.
- The Triangle (film), 2001 thriller television movie
- The Triangle (miniseries), 2005 US-British-German science fiction TV three-parter.
- Scooby-Doo! Pirates Ahoy!, 2006 direct-to-DVD film
- Wizards of Waverly Place, 2007 fantasy series the Triangle is a realm in which wizards' magic does not work
- Suite Life on Deck, 2008 sitcom where the Triangle is used to explore an alternate reality where the protagonists didn't grow up together.
- "Welcome to Bikini Bottom Triangle", 2011 episode of Spongebob Squarepants

== See also ==
- Devil's Sea (or Dragon's Triangle)
- List of Bermuda Triangle incidents
- List of topics characterized as pseudoscience
- Nevada Triangle
- Vile vortex
