= Lübeck (electoral district) =

Federal electoral district of Germany

11 Lübeck
- Electoral district for the Bundestag
- Lübeck in 2025
- State: Schleswig-Holstein
- Population: 235,600 (2019)
- Electorate: 179,394 (2021)
- Major settlements: Lübeck
- Area: 406.3 km^{2}

Current electoral district
- Created: 1949
- Party: SPD
- Member: Tim Klüssendorf
- Elected: 2021, 2025

Lübeck is an electoral constituency (German: Wahlkreis) represented in the Bundestag. It elects one member via first-past-the-post voting. Under the current constituency numbering system, it is designated as constituency 11. It is located in southern Schleswig-Holstein, comprising the city of Lübeck and parts of the Herzogtum Lauenburg district.

Lübeck was created for the inaugural 1949 federal election. Since 2021, it has been represented by Tim Klüssendorf of the Social Democratic Party (SPD).

== Geography ==
Lübeck is located in southern Schleswig-Holstein. As of the 2021 federal election, it comprises the urban district of Lübeck and the Ämter of Berkenthin and former Amt of Sandesneben from the Herzogtum Lauenburg district.

== History ==
Lübeck was created in 1949. Until 1972, it was constituency 9 in the numbering system. In the 1949 and 1953 elections, it covered the entirety of the city of Lübeck with the exception of voting districts 28, 30–33, 35–42, 52–55, 57–59, 140–143, and 151–161). In the 1957 and 1961 elections, it did not cover voting districts 26, 28–33, 35–43, 45–49, 52–57, 145–148, 150–153, 155, 156, 158, and 160. In the 1965 election, it acquired constituency number 11, and its borders were coterminous with the urban district of Lübeck, which remained until the 2002 election. At this election, the Ämter of Berkenthin and Sandesneben were transferred into the Lübeck constituency; the Amt of Sandesneben was abolished in 2008, but the constituency was not geographically affected.

Election	No.	Name	Borders
1949	9	Lübeck	Lübeck city (excluding voting districts 28, 30–33, 35–42, 52–55, 57–59, 140–143, and 151–161)
1953	9	Lübeck	Lübeck city (excluding voting districts 28, 30–33, 35–42, 52–55, 57–59, 140–143, and 151–161)
1957	9	Lübeck	Lübeck city (excluding voting districts 26, 28–33, 35–43, 45–49, 52–57, 145–148, 150–153, 155, 156, 158, and 160)
1961	9	Lübeck	Lübeck city (excluding voting districts 26, 28–33, 35–43, 45–49, 52–57, 145–148, 150–153, 155, 156, 158, and 160)
1965	11	Lübeck	Lübeck city
1969	11	Lübeck	Lübeck city
1972	11	Lübeck	Lübeck city
1976	11	Lübeck	Lübeck city
1980	11	Lübeck	Lübeck city
1983	11	Lübeck	Lübeck city
1987	11	Lübeck	Lübeck city
1990	11	Lübeck	Lübeck city
1994	11	Lübeck	Lübeck city
1998	11	Lübeck	Lübeck city
2002	11	Lübeck	Lübeck city; Herzogtum Lauenburg district (only Berkenthin Amt and former Sandesneben Amt)
2005	11	Lübeck	Lübeck city; Herzogtum Lauenburg district (only Berkenthin Amt and former Sandesneben Amt)
2009	11	Lübeck	Lübeck city; Herzogtum Lauenburg district (only Berkenthin Amt and former Sandesneben Amt)
2013	11	Lübeck	Lübeck city; Herzogtum Lauenburg district (only Berkenthin Amt and former Sandesneben Amt)
2017	11	Lübeck	Lübeck city; Herzogtum Lauenburg district (only Berkenthin Amt and former Sandesneben Amt)
2021	11	Lübeck	Lübeck city; Herzogtum Lauenburg district (only Berkenthin Amt and former Sandesneben Amt)
2025	11	Lübeck	Lübeck city; Herzogtum Lauenburg district (only Berkenthin Amt and former Sandesneben Amt)

== Members ==
The constituency has been held by the Social Democratic Party (SPD) during all but five Bundestag terms since 1949; it returned a representative from the SPD in every federal election from 1969 through 2013. Its first representative was Paul Bromme of the SPD, who served for a single term. The constituency was won by the Christian Democratic Union (CDU) in 1953, and represented by Paul Bock (until 1957) and Helmut Wendelborn. It was won by the SPD in 1969, and represented by future Minister-President of Schleswig-Holstein Björn Engholm until 1983. He was succeeded by Reinhold Hiller, who served until 2002. Between then and 2017, it was represented by Gabriele Hiller-Ohm. It was held by Claudia Schmidtke of the CDU for one term before SPD candidate Tim Klüssendorf regained it in 2021.

Election	Member	Party	%
1949	Paul Bromme	SPD	35.8
1953	Paul Bock	CDU	42.3
1957	Helmut Wendelborn	CDU	52.3
1961	Helmut Wendelborn	CDU	43.5
1965	Helmut Wendelborn	CDU	47.7
1969	Björn Engholm	SPD	49.9
1972	Björn Engholm	SPD	58.8
1976	Björn Engholm	SPD	54.1
1980	Björn Engholm	SPD	55.7
1983	Reinhold Hiller	SPD	48.6
1987	Reinhold Hiller	SPD	46.3
1990	Reinhold Hiller	SPD	43.1
1994	Reinhold Hiller	SPD	45.7
1998	Reinhold Hiller	SPD	51.3
2002	Gabriele Hiller-Ohm	SPD	50.8
2005	Gabriele Hiller-Ohm	SPD	49.7
2009	Gabriele Hiller-Ohm	SPD	36.7
2013	Gabriele Hiller-Ohm	SPD	40.7
2017	Claudia Schmidtke	CDU	35.3
2021	Tim Klüssendorf	SPD	34.1
2025	Tim Klüssendorf	SPD	28.1

== Election results ==
=== 2025 election ===
Federal election (2025): Lübeck
Notes:	Blue background denotes the winner of the electorate vote. Pink background denotes a candidate elected from their party list. Yellow background denotes an electorate win by a list member, or other incumbent. A ✓ or ✗ denotes status of any incumbent, win or lose respectively.						
Party	Candidate	Votes	%	±%	Party votes	%	±%
SPD	✓ Tim Klüssendorf	39,809	28.1	▼6.0	30,026	21.1	▼9.4
CDU	Nils Lötsch	33,695	23.8	▲2.0	32,037	22.5	▲4.4
Greens	Bruno Hönel	27,477	19.4	▼2.0	25,444	17.9	▼4.5
AfD	Kerstin Przygodda	21,972	15.5	▲8.9	22,254	15.7	▲8.9
Left	Andreas Müller	10,175	7.2	▲4.1	14,921	10.5	▲6.1
FDP	Robert Schörck	4,028	2.8	▼4.6	5,547	3.9	▼6.6
BSW					5,307	3.7	New
SSW					2,664	1.9	▲0.6
Volt	Kathrin Ostertag	2,350	1.7	▲1.1	1,529	1.1	▲0.7
PARTEI					1,147	0.8	▼0.2
FW	Sabastian Ising	1,960	1.4	0.0	1,006	0.7	▼0.3
BD					198	0.1	New
MLPD	Lüder Möller	286	0.2	▲0.1	90	0.1	0.0
Informal votes		1,247			829		
Total valid votes		141,752			142,170		
Turnout		142,999	80.2	▲6.9			
SPD hold	Majority	6,114	4.3	▼8.0			

=== 2021 election ===
Federal election (2021): Lübeck
Notes:	Blue background denotes the winner of the electorate vote. Pink background denotes a candidate elected from their party list. Yellow background denotes an electorate win by a list member, or other incumbent. A ✓ or ✗ denotes status of any incumbent, win or lose respectively.						
Party	Candidate	Votes	%	±%	Party votes	%	±%
SPD	Tim Klüssendorf	44,315	34.1	▲0.3	39,704	30.5	▲5.1
CDU	✗ Claudia Schmidtke	28,266	21.8	▼13.5	23,628	18.1	▼11.3
Greens	Bruno Hönel	27,809	21.4	▲8.4	29,229	22.4	▲9.7
FDP	Heike Stegemann	9,700	7.5	▲1.0	13,626	10.5	▼0.4
AfD	David Jenniches	8,538	6.6	▼2.1	8,827	6.8	▼2.1
Left	Emil Tankacheyev	4,020	3.1		5,785	4.4	▼5.0
SSW					1,666	1.3	
Tierschutzpartei					1,495	1.1	
PARTEI	Alexander Schacht	2,193	1.7		1,329	1.0	▼0.4
FW	Gregor Voht	1,788	1.4	▼0.6	1,296	1.0	▲0.2
dieBasis	Uta Kemper	1,594	1.2		1,531	1.2	
Team Todenhöfer					663	0.5	
Volt	Fabio Sánchez Copano	765	0.6		550	0.4	
Humanists					196	0.2	
NPD					166	0.1	▼0.1
ÖDP					134	0.1	▼0.1
V-Partei3					122	0.1	
du.	Jennifer Wobusa	298	0.2		106	0.1	
Independent	Thorsten Kerkhoff	220	0.2				
MLPD	Lüder Möller	189	0.1	▼0.6	71	0.1	▼0.1
DKP	Wilfried Emil Link	91	0.1		46	0.0	
LKR	Lutz Nielsen	89	0.1		67	0.1	
Informal votes		1,580			1,218		
Total valid votes		129,875			130,237		
Turnout		131,455	73.3	▲1.2			
SPD gain from CDU	Majority	16,049	12.3				

=== 2017 election ===
Federal election (2017): Lübeck
Notes:	Blue background denotes the winner of the electorate vote. Pink background denotes a candidate elected from their party list. Yellow background denotes an electorate win by a list member, or other incumbent. A ✓ or ✗ denotes status of any incumbent, win or lose respectively.						
Party	Candidate	Votes	%	±%	Party votes	%	±%
CDU	Claudia Schmidtke	45,432	35.3	▼1.2	38,263	29.5	▼4.8
SPD	✗ Gabriele Hiller-Ohm	43,578	33.9	▼6.8	32,919	25.4	▼8.8
Greens	Thorsten Fürter	16,785	13.0	▲5.3	16,568	12.7	▲1.7
AfD	Hans-Eberhard Knust	11,137	8.7	▲5.3	11,539	8.9	▲4.6
FDP	Timo Jeguschke	8,312	6.5	▲4.1	14,097	10.9	▲6.1
Left					12,213	9.4	▲2.9
FW	Ingo Voht	2,535	2.0	▲1.1	1,091	0.8	▲0.2
PARTEI					1,850	1.4	
MLPD	Lüder Möller	954	0.7		162	0.1	0.0
BGE					475	0.4	
NPD					351	0.3	▼0.5
ÖDP					266	0.2	
Informal votes		2,228			1,167		
Total valid votes		128,733			129,794		
Turnout		130,961	72.1	▲3.5			
CDU gain from SPD	Majority	1,854	1.4				

=== 2013 election ===
Federal election (2013): Lübeck
Notes:	Blue background denotes the winner of the electorate vote. Pink background denotes a candidate elected from their party list. Yellow background denotes an electorate win by a list member, or other incumbent. A ✓ or ✗ denotes status of any incumbent, win or lose respectively.						
Party	Candidate	Votes	%	±%	Party votes	%	±%
SPD	✓ Gabriele Hiller-Ohm	50,119	40.7	▲4.0	42,083	34.1	▲4.0
CDU	Alexandra Dinges-Dierig	44,896	36.5	▲6.1	42,218	34.2	▲7.1
Greens	Spyridon Aslanidis	9,475	7.7	▼3.9	13,638	11.1	▼2.8
Left	Jens Schulz	6,662	5.4	▼3.7	7,970	6.5	▼3.4
AfD	Christoph Elfenkämper	4,152	3.4		5,323	4.3	
FDP	Gerrit Koch	2,958	2.4	▼8.6	5,857	4.8	▼9.4
Pirates	Moritz von Allwörden	2,825	2.3		2,994	2.4	▼0.1
FW	Thomas Misch	1,113	0.9		781	0.6	
NPD	Kai Otzen	948	0.8	▼0.5	974	0.8	▼0.4
Tierschutzpartei					918	0.7	
Rentner					422	0.3	▼0.6
MLPD					93	0.0	0.0
Informal votes		1,563			1,440		
Total valid votes		123,148			123,271		
Turnout		124,711	68.6	▼0.5			
SPD hold	Majority	5,223	4.2	▼2.2			

=== 2009 election ===
Federal election (2009): Lübeck
Notes:	Blue background denotes the winner of the electorate vote. Pink background denotes a candidate elected from their party list. Yellow background denotes an electorate win by a list member, or other incumbent. A ✓ or ✗ denotes status of any incumbent, win or lose respectively.						
Party	Candidate	Votes	%	±%	Party votes	%	±%
SPD	✓ Gabriele Hiller-Ohm	44,393	36.7	▼13.0	36,578	30.1	▼13.2
CDU	Anke Eymer	36,745	30.3	▼5.3	32,970	27.2	▼4.0
Greens	Volker Koß	14,098	11.6	▲7.3	16,764	13.8	▲4.6
FDP	Wilhelm Melchers	13,296	11.0	▲7.5	17,173	14.2	▲5.8
Left	Sascha Thomas	10,973	9.1	▲4.9	12,002	9.9	▲4.3
Pirates					3,010	2.5	
NPD	Thomas Wulff	1,595	1.3	▲0.3	1,412	1.2	▲0.1
Rentner					1,197	1.0	
DVU					144	0.1	
MLPD					90	0.1	0.0
Informal votes		3,524			3,284		
Total valid votes		121,100			121,340		
Turnout		124,624	69.1	▼4.7			
SPD hold	Majority	7,648	6.3	▼7.8			

=== 2005 election ===
Federal election (2005):Lübeck
Notes:	Blue background denotes the winner of the electorate vote. Pink background denotes a candidate elected from their party list. Yellow background denotes an electorate win by a list member, or other incumbent. A ✓ or ✗ denotes status of any incumbent, win or lose respectively.						
Party	Candidate	Votes	%	±%	Party votes	%	±%
SPD	✓ Gabriele Hiller-Ohm	64,442	49,.7	▼1.2	56,267	43.4	▼4.3
CDU	Anke Eymer	46,254	35.6	▲1.0	40,458	31.2	▼0.6
Greens	Angelika Birk	5,664	4.4	▼2.4	11,928	9.2	▼0.7
Left	Ragnar Lüttke	5,358	4.1	▲2.2	7,236	5.6	▲4.0
FDP	Michaela Blunk	4,493	3.5	▼1.9	10,859	8.4	▲1.7
Familie	Helmut Ruge	2,249	1.2		1,488	1.1	
NPD	Reinhart Jahnke	1,322	1.0		1,352	1.0	▲0.7
MLPD					142	0.1	
Informal votes		2,286			2,338		
Total valid votes		129,782			129,730		
Turnout		132,068	73.7	▼3.1			
SPD hold	Majority	18,188	14.1				
