= Bock (surname) =

Bock is a German surname. Notable people with the surname include:

- Adam Bock (born 1961), Canadian playwright
- André Bock (born 1973), German politician
- Audie Bock (born 1946), American film scholar and politician
- Berta Bock (1857–1945), Romanian composer
- Brittany Bock (born 1987), American soccer player
- Carl Ernst Bock (1809–1874), German anatomist
- Charles Bock, American writer
- Darrell Bock (born 1953), research professor of New Testament studies in Dallas, Texas
- Dennis Bock (born 1964), Canadian novelist
- Eberhardt Otto George von Bock (d. 1814), Hanoverian cavalry general
- Ernest-Camille Bock (1894–1952), governor of Orientale Province in the Belgian Congo from 1945 to 1952.
- Fedor von Bock (1880–1945), German field marshal of World War II
- Felicia Gressitt Bock (1916–2011), American scholar and translator
- Friedrich Samuel Bock (1716–1785), German philosopher and theologian
- Gisela Bock (1942–2025), German historian
- Hans Bock (chemist) (1928–2008), German chemist
- Hans Bock (painter), 16th-century German painter
- Hans Georg Bock (born 1948), German professor of mathematics and scientific computing
- Heini Bock (born 1981), Namibian rugby union scrum-half
- Hieronymus Bock (1498–1554), medieval German botanist
- Ior Bock (1942–2010), Finnish historian
- Jerry Bock (1928–2010), American musical theatre composer
- John Bock, German artist
- Karolina Bock (1792–1872), Swedish dancer, actor and singer
- Kate Bock (born 1988), fashion model
- Larry Bock (1959–2016), American entrepreneur
- Lorenz Bock (1883–1948), politician
- Mathieu Bock-Côté (born 1980), Québécois journalist
- Michel Bock (born 1971), Canadian historian
- Nathalie Bock (born 1988), German football midfielder
- Nathan Bock (born 1983), Australian rules footballer
- Otto Bock (1881–?), Danish athlete
- Paul Bock (1890–1968), German politician
- Peter Bock (born 1948), American politician
- Rainer Bock (born 1954), German actor
- Richard Bock (1865–1949), American sculptor
- Roland Bock (1944–2025), German wrestler
- Rolf Bock (1937–2022), German football manager
- Thea Bock (1938–2025), German politician
- Thomas Bock (1793–1855), Australian artist
- Ute Bock (1942–2018), Austrian educator
- Violetta Bock (born 1987), German politician
- Walter Bock (1895–1948), German chemist
- Walter Joseph Bock (1933–2022), American ornithologist

== See also ==
- Tan Cheng Bock, Singaporean politician (surname Tan, given name Cheng Bock)
