= Bock (disambiguation) =

Bock is a type of strong lager originating from Germany.

Bock may also refer to:

- Super Bock, a Portuguese brand of strong pale lager
- Bock (bagpipe), a type of bellows-blown bagpipe native to Germany, Austria, and Bohemia
- Bote & Bock, a German publishing house

== People ==
- Bock (footballer), the nickname of a retired Portuguese professional footballer
- Bock (surname), or Böck, surnames

== Places ==
- Bock (Luxembourg), a fortified promontory in Luxembourg City
- Bock, Minnesota, a small city in the United States
- Bock (island), a German island in the Baltic Sea

== See also ==
- Bach (disambiguation)
