= Nathaniel Weil =

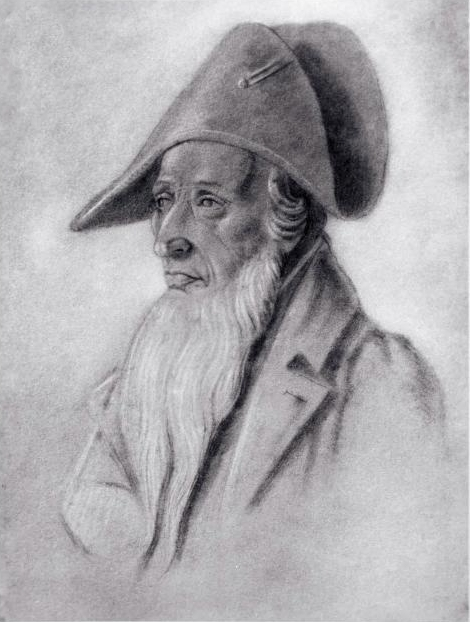
Rabbi Natanael Weil as rabbi of Karlsruhe, mid-18th century

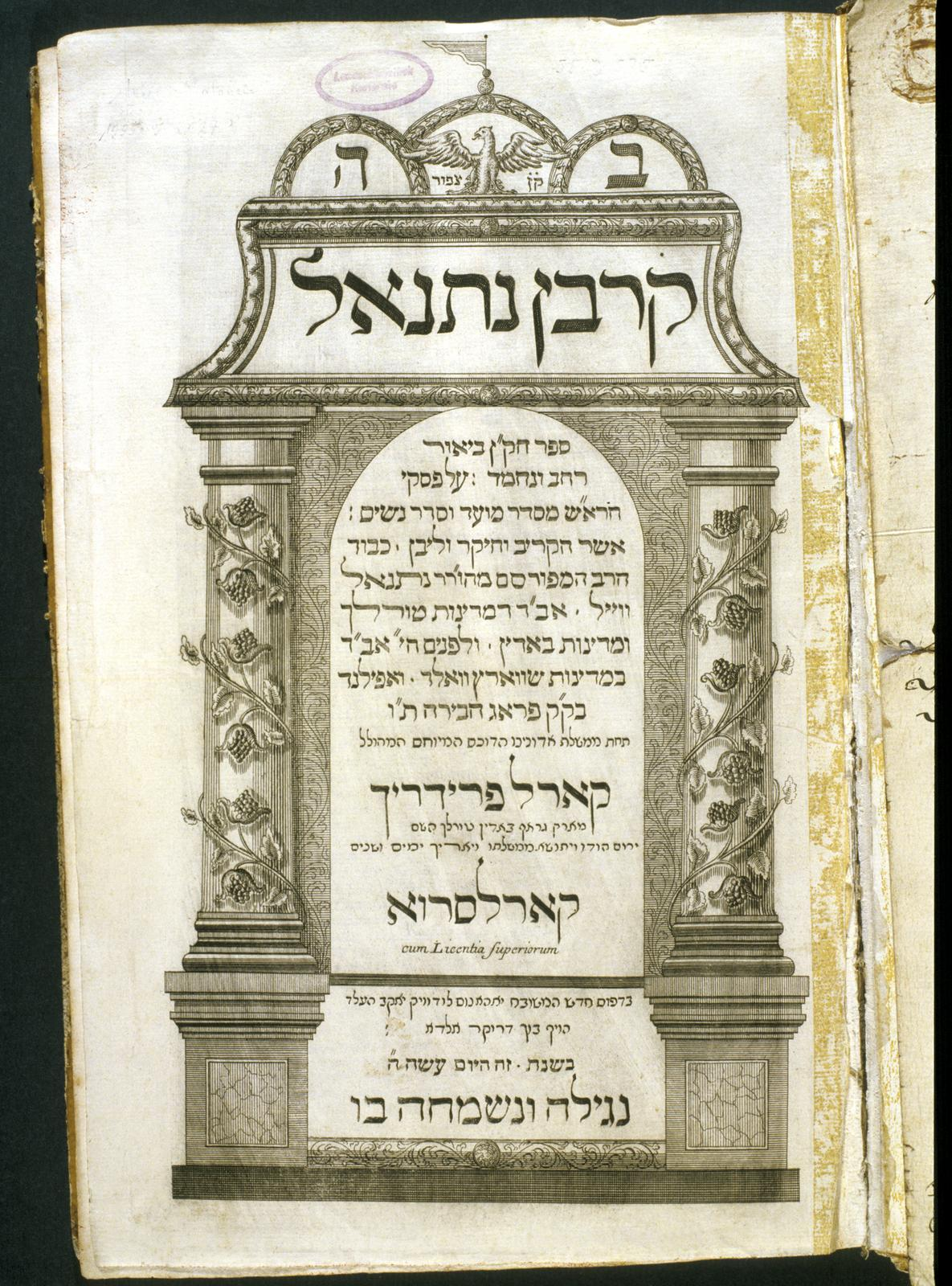
Title page of the Talmud commentary Korban Netana'el, Karlsruhe 1755

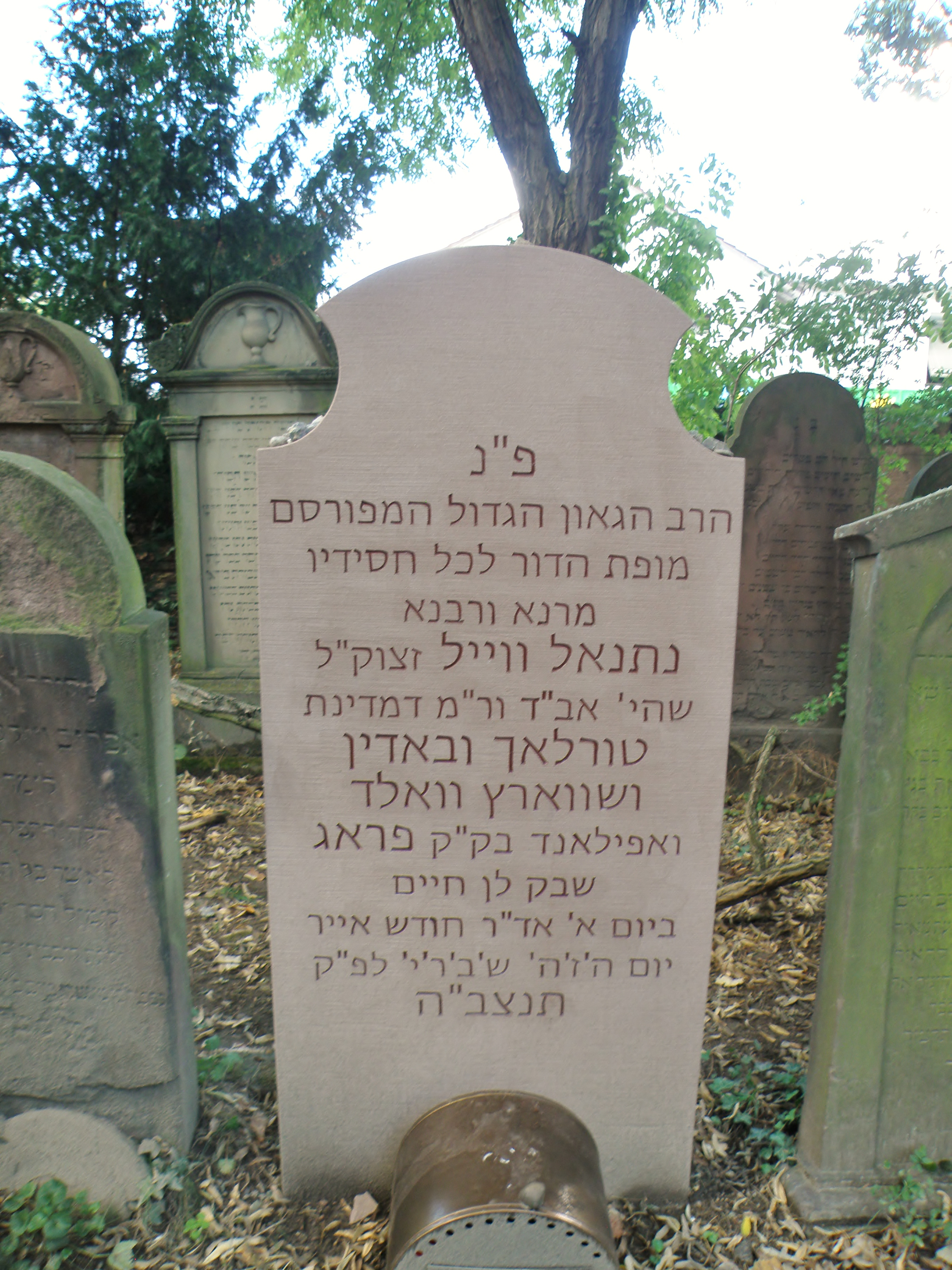
Gravestone to rabbi Nataniel Weil, in 2013

Nathaniel Weil (1687 – 7 May 1769) was a rabbi and talmudist born at Stühlingen, son of Naphtali Zvi Hirsch Weil.

== Biography ==
His mother took him to Fürth when he was ten years old, and sent him afterward on a wagon to Prague, where his father's brother, Lippman Weil, adopted him. Although so young, he was granted permission to attend the lectures of R. Abraham Broda, head of the Prague yeshiva; R. Abraham was so impressed with him that he arranged a match between him and R. Abraham's niece, Vögele פיגלא. The wedding was celebrated in 1708, and when R. Abraham was called to the rabbinate of Metz, Nathaniel came with him. In 1717 he returned to Prague, where he occupied himself with Talmudic studies and with teaching thousands of students, while drawing a scanty salary as assistant rabbi of Prague.

Weil remained in Prague until the issue of the edict of Maria Theresa of Austria of Dec. 18, 1744, ordering the expulsion of all Jews from Bohemia. This proved to be the means of releasing him from a burdensome existence, for he was then offered the rabbinate of the Black Forest, with headquarters in Mühringen (near Horb am Neckar). He assumed office in 1745, and held it for five years, writing the greater part of his commentary on Asher ben Jehiel during that time. In 1750 he was called as rabbi to Karlsruhe, and there he completed the commentary in the spring of 1754. It was published at Karlsruhe in 1755 under the title Korban Nethan'el, and was later printed together with Asheri in editions of the Talmud, although it embraces only the orders Moed and Nashim.

Nathaniel officiated in Karlsruhe for about twenty years, and died at Rastatt on May 7, 1769. In addition to the Ḳorban Netan'el, which was published by himself, he was the author of two works published posthumously by his son Simeon Hirsch:

1. Netib Ḥayyim (Fürth, 1779), containing critical notes on the Shulhan Aruk, Oraḥ Ḥayyim, and its commentaries, the Ṭure Zahab and Magen Abraham
2. Torat Netan'el (ib. 1795), in two parts, the first consisting of a collection of his responsa, and the second consisting of halakic derashot on the Pentateuch

Also published posthumously were:

- "Minhat Netanel" (Bilgoray, 1936), selected notes on the Babylonian Talmud.
- "Korban Netanel al Ha-Shas" (Jerusalem, 1995), his commentary on the Babylonian Talmud.

The photograph posted is of the backside of the newly renovated tombstone. Attached is a photograph of the front of the newly renovated tombstone.
