= Berlitz =

Berlitz can refer to:

- Berlitz Corporation, formerly Berlitz International
- Maximilian Berlitz, founder of the Berlitz Language Schools
- Charles Berlitz, grandson of Maximilian Berlitz and author of several Bermuda Triangle related books
- Platinum Berlitz, one of the Pokédex holders in Pokémon Special
