= Bach (disambiguation) =

Johann Sebastian Bach (1685–1750) was a German composer of the Baroque period.

Bach may also refer to:

== People ==
- Bach (surname)
  - Bach family, a noted family in music
- Bach (actor), stage name of French actor, singer and music hall performer Charles-Joseph Pasquier (1882–1953)
- Bach Buquen (born 2005 or 2006), French social media influencer
- King Bach (born 1988), American actor, comedian, and Internet personality
- Bill Bachrach (1879–1959), American swim coach known as "Bach"
- Joel Sirkis (1561–1640), Polish posek and halakhist, known as "the Bach"
- P. D. Q. Bach (1807–1742), a fictitious composer invented by musical satirist Peter Schickele
- Nigel Bach, the pen name of Tom Fanslau, the creator of the Bad Ben series

== Places ==
- Bach, Austria, a municipality in Reutte
- Bach, Lot, a commune in France
- Bach an der Donau, a town in Regensburg, Bavaria, Germany
- Bäch, a settlement of the Freienbach municipality in Schwyz, Switzerland
  - Bäch railway station, in Freienbach, Switzerland
- Bach, Michigan, US, an unincorporated community
- Bach Ice Shelf, on Alexander Island, Antarctica
- Bach quadrangle, on the planet Mercury
- Bach (crater), on the planet Mercury
- 1814 Bach, an asteroid

== Radio stations ==
- WBQK, a radio station licensed to West Point, Virginia, US, known as Bach FM
- WLTT, a defunct radio station formerly licensed to Carolina Beach, North Carolina, US, known as Bach FM from 2011 to 2013

== Other uses ==
- Bach Gesellschaft, an 1850 society for publishing J.S. Bach's complete works
- Bach (journal), an academic journal of Baroque music
- BACH motif, a sequence of notes
- Bach (New Zealand), a modest holiday home or beach house
- Brown Association for Cooperative Housing, in Providence, Rhode Island, United States
- Bach Aircraft, an aircraft manufacturer from 1927 to 1931
- Bach-Werke-Verzeichnis (abbreviated BWV), a catalogue of compositions by J.S. Bach
- Quarry Bach, a slate quarry near Cilgerran, Wales

== See also ==
- Bache (disambiguation)
- Bach House (disambiguation)
- Batch (disambiguation)
- Bạch, a Vietnamese surname
- Bachs, a municipality in the canton of Zürich, Switzerland
