= Rexingen =

Rexingen may refer to:

- Rexingen, Baden-Württemberg, town in Germany
- Rexingen, Bas-Rhin, village in France
