= London School of English =

English language teaching establishment

The London School of English
- English as a second language
- Location: London
- Coordinates: 51.5051°N 0.2111°W
- Motto in English: to help people communicate more effectively across borders and cultures, leading to personal and professional development, benefit for sponsors and employers, and greater international understanding.
- Founder: Alfred James P. Larke (1888 – 1957)
- Established: 1912
- Head: Hauke Tallon, Chief Executive
- Website: www.londonschool.com

The London School of English is a private English language teaching organisation based in London, with a small operation in Sweden.

Established in 1912, it is among the oldest accredited English language schools in the UK, offering a range of English courses primarily designed for adult learners.

== History ==
The London School of English was founded in 1912 (Note: There were at least two addresses trading under the name "London School of English" in the early 1900s, advertisements for an address 52 Oxford Street in 1901 and 1906 and 34 Knox Street near Marlybone in 1909.) by Alfred James P. Larke c. (1888 – 1957), a former Berlitz teacher, together with a partner, Walter Beazley. In 1921 the partnership was terminated and Larke became the sole proprietor.

In the early days, the school taught both English and other languages. Larke published the textbooks, Larke’s System and English for Foreign Students, which formed the foundation of the school's work for many years. They were regularly updated, but were abandoned in the early 1970s as being no longer in line with contemporary ideas of language learning.

Larke retired around 1950, handing over to a member of the school staff, William John Hailes (1905–1960), with the formal incorporation of the company "The London School of English and Foreign Languages Limited" on 17 August 1953 to carry on Larke's business trading as The London School of English and Foreign. Hailes had joined the school as a junior employee, working his way up to Principal. After his sudden death in 1960 his wife organised a transfer of the company to Peter Alfred Fabian (1919 - ). a German citizen who had obtained a first class honours degree at Cambridge in 1947. He had started to work for the school in the mid-1950s, acquiring ownership in 1961.

The original premises were on the corner of Oxford Street and Dering Street. During the early 1950s, further premises were added in Princes Street, just south of Oxford Circus, and eventually the Oxford Street premises were abandoned and operations consolidated in Princes Street. In 1962, the school acquired the Oversea Language Centre, a smaller school situated opposite in Princes Street.

In the 1960s TLSE moved to new premises in Holland Park, some 6 km west.

In 1997 the school was acquired by Timothy Blake, a long-standing member of the staff. He remains the owner but in 2012 transferred everyday operational control to Hauke Tallon, also an existing member of the staff.

In an inspection in June 2019 the British Council recommended TLSE's continued accreditation having met required standards of management, teaching, welfare and resources provided in suitable premises. (Note: The British Council June 2019 report will expire in 31 March 2024 unless superseded.)

The COVID-19 pandemic has impacted English language teaching demand with many providers put in difficulties and TLSE needing to close its Canterbury and Westcroft Square sites by 2020.

=== Offshore ===
TLSE has established branches and organised English language teaching in other countries: a permanent branch being established in Stockholm, and some branches run as franchises. Offshore courses have also been organised in other countries.

== Services ==
TLSE provides English language teaching services in both open and closed groups, catering for general, academic, and professional for adults. (Note: Adults being defined as those at least 18 years of age.)

As well as the main Holland Park Gardens base, mostly used by mature professionals on short term courses, TLSE also operated a site at Westcroft Square typically used by students in their twenties on longer term courses. TLSE also had an additional accredited site in Canterbury, Kent. With the COVID-19 pandemic, TLSE had been forced to keep only its Holland Park site open in the UK.

The London School of International Communication and London School Online are related businesses. The London School Trust, a charity which sponsors educational, and cultural development projects is funded by TLSE. An additional overseas branch is located in Stockholm, Sweden.

== Bibliography ==
- Larke, Alfred J. P. (1921). Larke's System. English for foreign students. London: London School of English. OCLC 562097617.
- Larke, Alfred J. P. (1929). French for Beginners. (Méthode Larke.). London: London School of English & Foreign Languages. OCLC 562097611.
- Larke, Alfred J. P.; Jacomb, Charles E. (1957) [1954]. Larke's System. English for foreign students ... Revised ... by C.E. Jacomb. London: London School of English. OCLC 562097625.
