= Przygodda =

Przygodda is a surname. Notable people with the surname include:

- Kerstin Przygodda (born 1962), German politician
- Peter Przygodda (1941–2011), German filmmaker and editor

== See also ==
- Przygoda z piosenką
