= Abraham ben Saul Broda =

Bohemian Talmudist (Talmudforscher)

Abraham ben Saul Broda (Hebrew: אברהם בן שאול ברודא; c. 1640 – 11 April 1717) was a Bohemian Talmudist (Talmudforscher).

== Biography ==
Abraham ben Saul Broda was born in Prague in c. 1640. Saul Broda sent his son to Kraków to pursue his Talmudic studies with Rabbi Isaac ben Ze'eb Ḥarif of that city, in order to withdraw him from what he considered the evil influences of Shabbethaism, at that time spreading throughout Bohemia. After receiving his rabbinical diploma, Broda returned to his native city, but was soon called as rabbi to Lichtenstadt/Hroznětín, and thence to Raudnitz/Roudnice Even then his reputation was so great that Shabbethai Bass asked for his approbation to a book that Bass had written. Hence, when the office of chief rabbi of Prague became vacant about 1693, it was offered to Broda, who accepted it, although it was probably not very remunerative in consequence of the great fire of 1689, which impoverished many members of the congregation. This office, from which he had doubtless expected much pleasure, involved him, on the contrary, in many difficulties; for when a difference arose between Broda and Ẓebi Ashkenazi in regard to a ritual question, all the rabbis of Prague took sides against Broda.

It was probably this that induced Broda, who disliked quarrels, to seek another position. He was called to Metz. The documents available are conflicting as to the date of his entry into office; but the contract of the community of Metz with Broda, dated 30 October 1708, has been discovered by Kaufmann, from which it is evident that Broda went to Metz in 1709, as claimed by Eliakim Carmoly, and not in 1703, as Cahen assumed. Here, as at Raudnitz and Prague, Broda's chief activity consisted in founding and directing a yeshibah; it is said that he had an excellent method of initiating into the style of the Talmud those who had never before pursued such study. His stay at Metz was of short duration; for in 1713 he was called to Frankfort-on-the-Main, where, also, he founded a yeshibah. This had a large attendance, many of his pupils becoming eminent rabbis. He died in Frankfort on 11 April 1717.

== Literary works ==
Broda's collected works appeared after his death. They include:

1. Ḥiddushe Geonim (Offenbach, 1723), consisting of scholia to the treatises Baba Ḳamma, Baba Meẓi'a, and Sanhedrin;
2. Ḥiddushe Halakot, on Giṭṭin, Wandsbeck, 1731;
3. Shema'ta Ḥadta, on Ketubot and Giṭṭin, Frankfort-on-the-Main, 1722;
4. Eshel Abraham, on Pesaḥim, Ḥullin, and Baba Batra, Frankfort-on-the-Main, 1747;
5. Toledot Abraham, on Ḳiddushin and Ketubot, Fürth, 1764;

Aside from these works written by him, many of his explanations of different questions are found in the works of other scholars, as in:

- Nathaniel Weil's Ḳorban Netanel, Karlsruhe, 1755;
- Ẓebi Ashkenazi's Ḥakam Ẓebi, et seq;
