= Simeon Hirsch Weil =

Simeon Hirsch Weil (Hebrew: שמעון הירש ווייל) was a German-Jewish scholar who lived in Carlsruhe in the eighteenth century. He published his father Nathaniel Weil's Netiv ḥayyim, Torat Netan'el, and responsa, and wrote Sefer Eldad ha-Dani (with a Judeo-German translation; 1769).
