= Bruno Hönel =

German politician (born 1996)

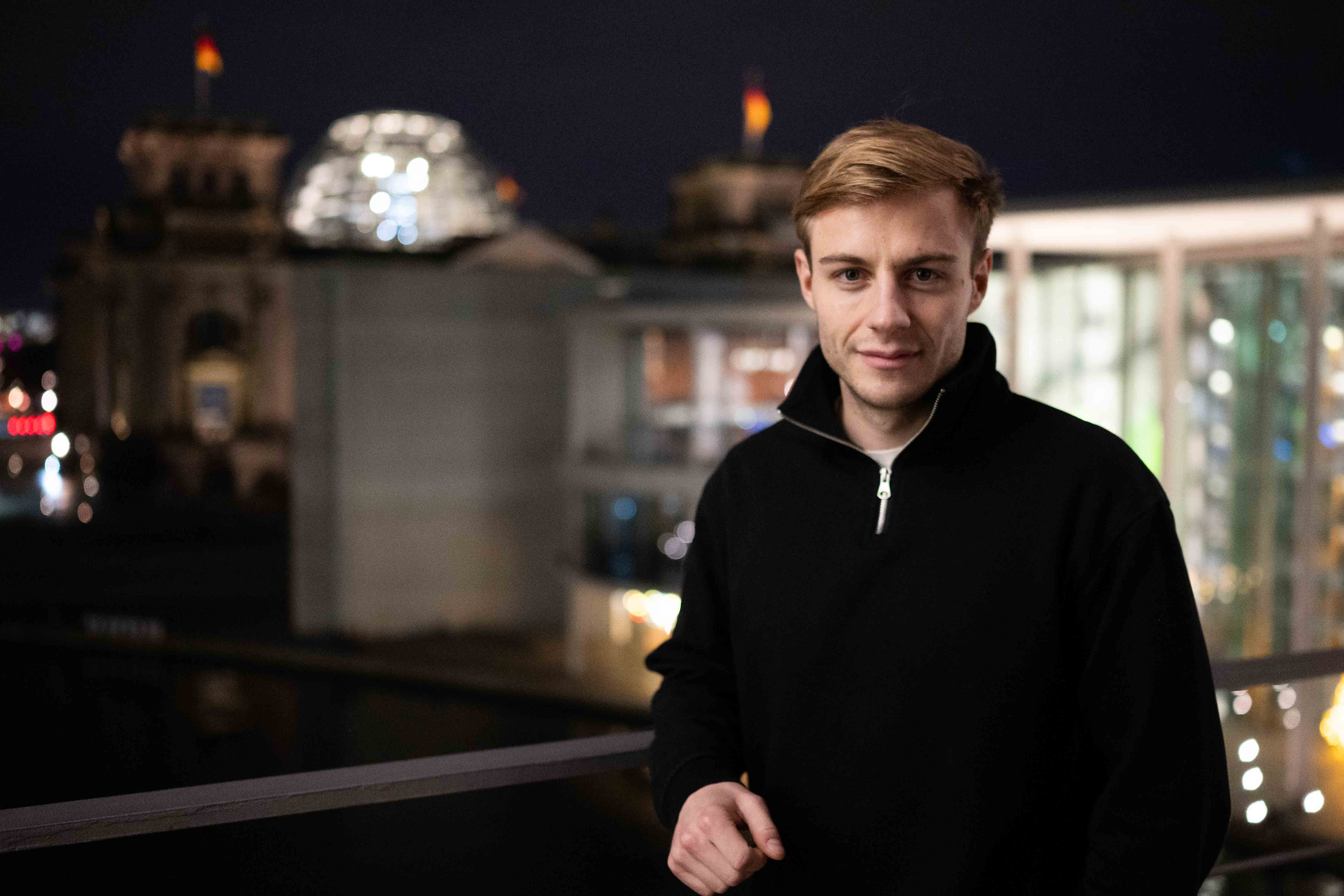
- Hönel in 2024

Member of the Bundestag
- In office 26 October 2021 – 2025

Personal details
- Born: 1 April 1996 (age 30) Dresden, Germany
- Party: Alliance 90/The Greens
- Education: University of Lübeck

Bruno Hönel (born 1 April 1996) is a German politician of the Alliance 90/The Greens who served as a member of the Bundestag from 2021 to 2025.

== Political career ==
Hönel was a member of the Bundestag from 2021 to 2025, representing the Lübeck district. In parliament, he served on the Budget Committee and its Subcommittee on European Affairs. In this capacity, he was his parliamentary group's rapporteur on the annual budget of the Federal Ministry of Education and Research.

== Other activities ==
- Nuclear Waste Disposal Fund (KENFO), Alternate Member of the Board of Trustees (since 2022)
- Association for the Taxation of Financial Transactions and for Citizens' Action (attac), Member
- German Federation for the Environment and Nature Conservation (BUND), Member
- German United Services Trade Union (ver.di), Member
