= Christina Rauscher =

Christina Rauscher (c. 1570–1618) was a German official and critic of witchcraft persecutions.

== Life ==
Christina Rauscher was the daughter of the rich textile merchant and brewer Martin Gerber of Horb and Anna Kurner, and the rich hotelier Horber Johann Rauscher of Innsbruck. In 1604, she was arrested and accused of witchcraft following political conflicts between the political elite families of the city. She was subjected to torture which caused her to have a miscarriage and held for about a year, but resisted torture and did not confess to anything. Her spouse and family protested against her arrest, and eventually managed to secure her release.

She sued the city government for her arrest. She was given the support of Archduke Maximilian Ernest of Austria, who in 1609 appointed her special independent government commissionaire ('Regierungskommissarin') with the authority to intervene in any legal crime made during the witchcraft persecutions. While there was no formal law against the appointment of a woman to an official post as commissionaire, it was a unique position for a woman during the witch hunt. She used her authority to intervene in the ongoing witch hunt of the County of Hohenberg, which she managed to stop.

== Legacy ==
A street in Horb was named after her: the Christina-Rauscher-Straße.
