= Claudia Schmidtke =

German politician

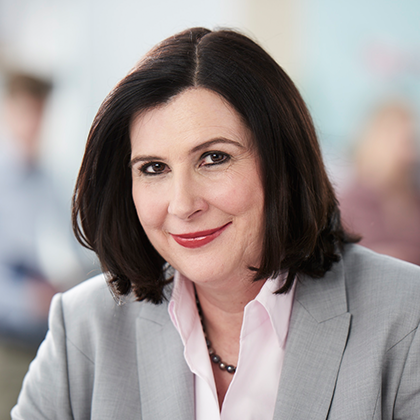
- Claudia Schmidtke in 2017

Member of the Bundestag for Lübeck
- In office 2017–2021
- Preceded by: Gabriele Hiller-Ohm
- Succeeded by: Tim Klüssendorf

Personal details
- Born: 29 March 1966 (age 60) Neumünster, West Germany (now Germany)
- Party: CDU
- Education: University of Hamburg

Claudia Schmidtke (born 29 March 1966) is a German cardiologist and politician of the Christian Democratic Union (CDU) who served as a member of the Bundestag from the state of Schleswig-Holstein from 2017 to 2021.

== Political career ==
Schmidtke became a member of the Bundestag in the 2017 German federal election. She defeated Gabriele Hiller-Ohm from the SPD, becoming the first CDU MP for the seat since 1969. She was a member of the Health Committee. Schmidtke lost her seat at the 2021 German federal election.

== Other activities ==
=== Government agencies ===
- Federal Agency for Civic Education (BPB), Alternate Member of the Board of Trustees (2018–2021)

=== Non-profit organizations ===
- Berlin Institute of Health (BIH), Member of the Scientific Advisory Board
- University of Lübeck, Member of the Board of Trustees
- Music and Congress Centre of Lübeck (MuK), Member of the Supervisory Board
- Cardiothoracic Surgery Network (CTSNet), Member
- European Association for Cardio-Thoracic Surgery (EACTS), Member
