= Tim Klüssendorf =

German politician (born 1991)

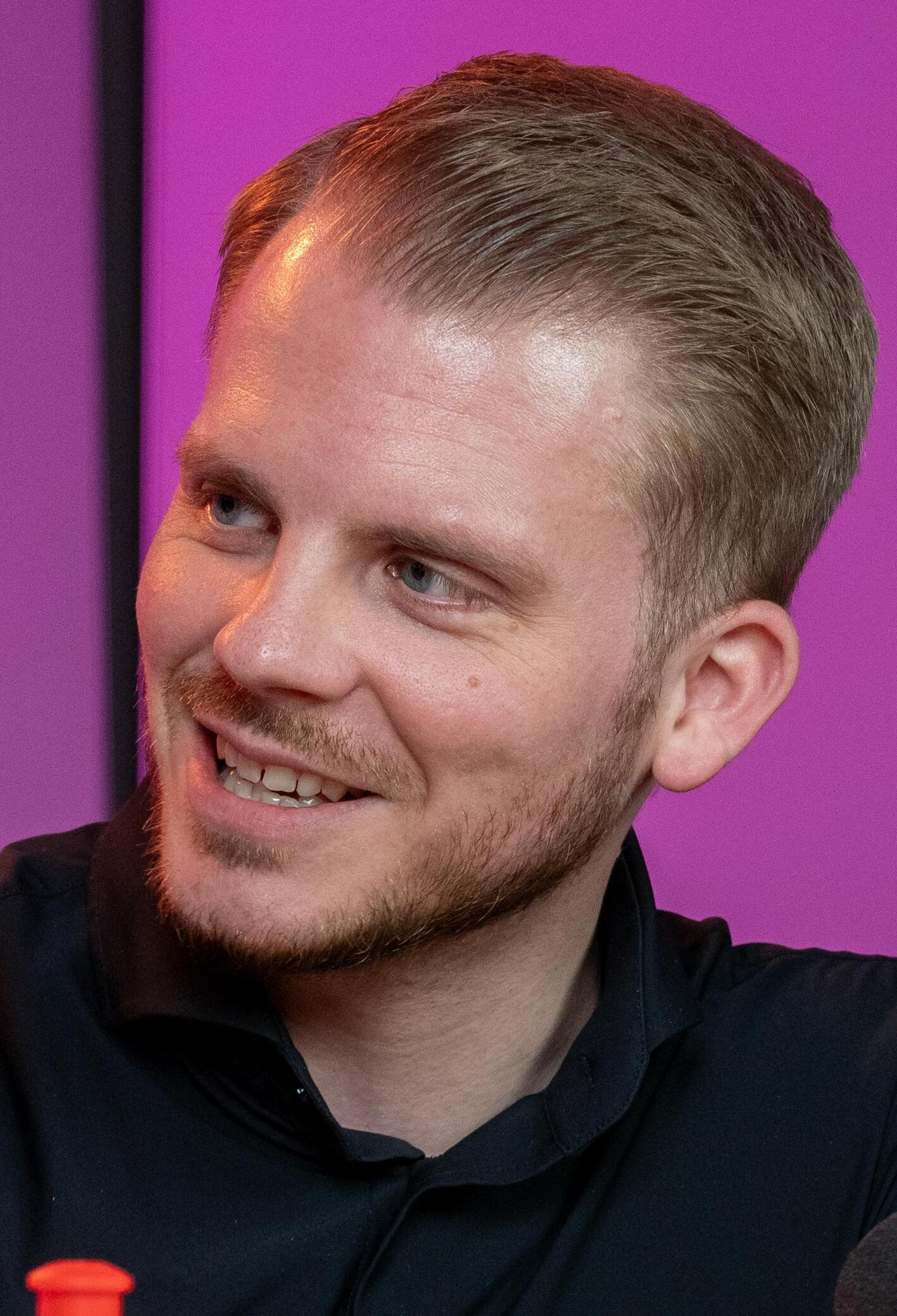
- Klüssendorf in 2025

Secretary General of the Social Democratic Party
- Incumbent
- Assumed office 27 June 2025
- Leader: Bärbel Bas; Lars Klingbeil
- Preceded by: Matthias Miersch

Member of the Bundestag for Lübeck
- Incumbent
- Assumed office 29 September 2021
- Preceded by: Claudia Schmidtke

Personal details
- Born: 16 August 1991 (age 35) Lübeck, Schleswig-Holstein, Germany
- Party: SPD (since 2007)
- Education: University of Hamburg

Tim Klüssendorf (born 16 August 1991) is a German economist and politician of the Social Democratic Party of Germany (SPD). He has been serving as a member of the Bundestag since the 2021 federal election, representing Lübeck, and has been the General Secretary of the SPD since June 2025. Klüssendorf is associated with the party's left wing and served as a spokesperson for the Parlamentarische Linke until 2025.

== Early life ==
Klüssendorf was born in Lübeck, Schleswig-Holstein, into a family of craftsmen. After completing his Abitur at the Ernestinenschule in 2011, and performing a year of voluntary service with the Lübecker Jugendring, he studied at the University of Hamburg. He earned a Bachelor of Science in economics in 2015, and a Master of Science in business administration in 2018.

== Political career ==
Klüssendorf joined the SPD in 2007, motivated by opposition to right-wing extremism in Lübeck. He served as chairperson of the Jusos Lübeck from 2010 to 2012 and was elected to the City Council in 2013, serving until 2018. During this time, he chaired the Youth Welfare Committee. From 2018 to 2021, Klüssendorf worked as a personal assistant to Lübeck Mayor Jan Lindenau.

In the 2021 German federal election, Klüssendorf won the Lübeck constituency, defeating CDU incumbent Claudia Schmidtke. He became a full member of the Finance Committee and a deputy member of the Digital Committee.

He is considered part of the party's left wing and has served as a spokesperson for the Parlamentarische Linke from 2024 to 2025.

Klüssendorf was re-elected in the 2025 federal election, again winning his direct mandate and remaining the only SPD candidate to secure a direct seat in Schleswig-Holstein.

In the negotiations to form a Grand Coalition following the 2025 German elections, Klüssendorf was part of the SPD delegation in the working group on public finances, led by Mathias Middelberg, Florian Oßner and Dennis Rohde.

Following the SPD's leadership restructuring in 2025, Klüssendorf was appointed interim General Secretary in May and was formally elected at the party's federal congress on 27 June 2025 with over 90% of delegate votes.

== Other activities ==
- VfB Lübeck, Member of the supervisory board (2021–2024)
- German United Services Trade Union (ver.di), Member
- Socialist Youth of Germany – The Falcons, Member
