= Martin Gerbert =

German scholar (1720–1793)

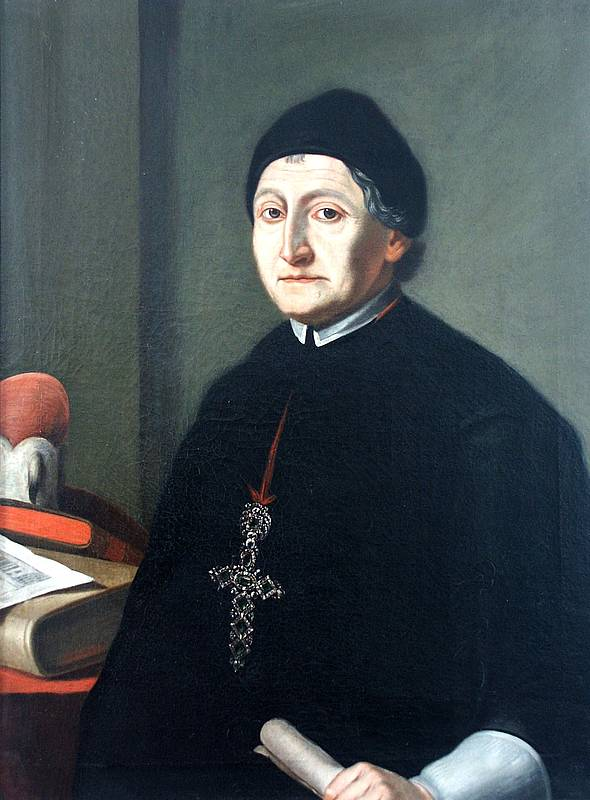
Martin Gerbert

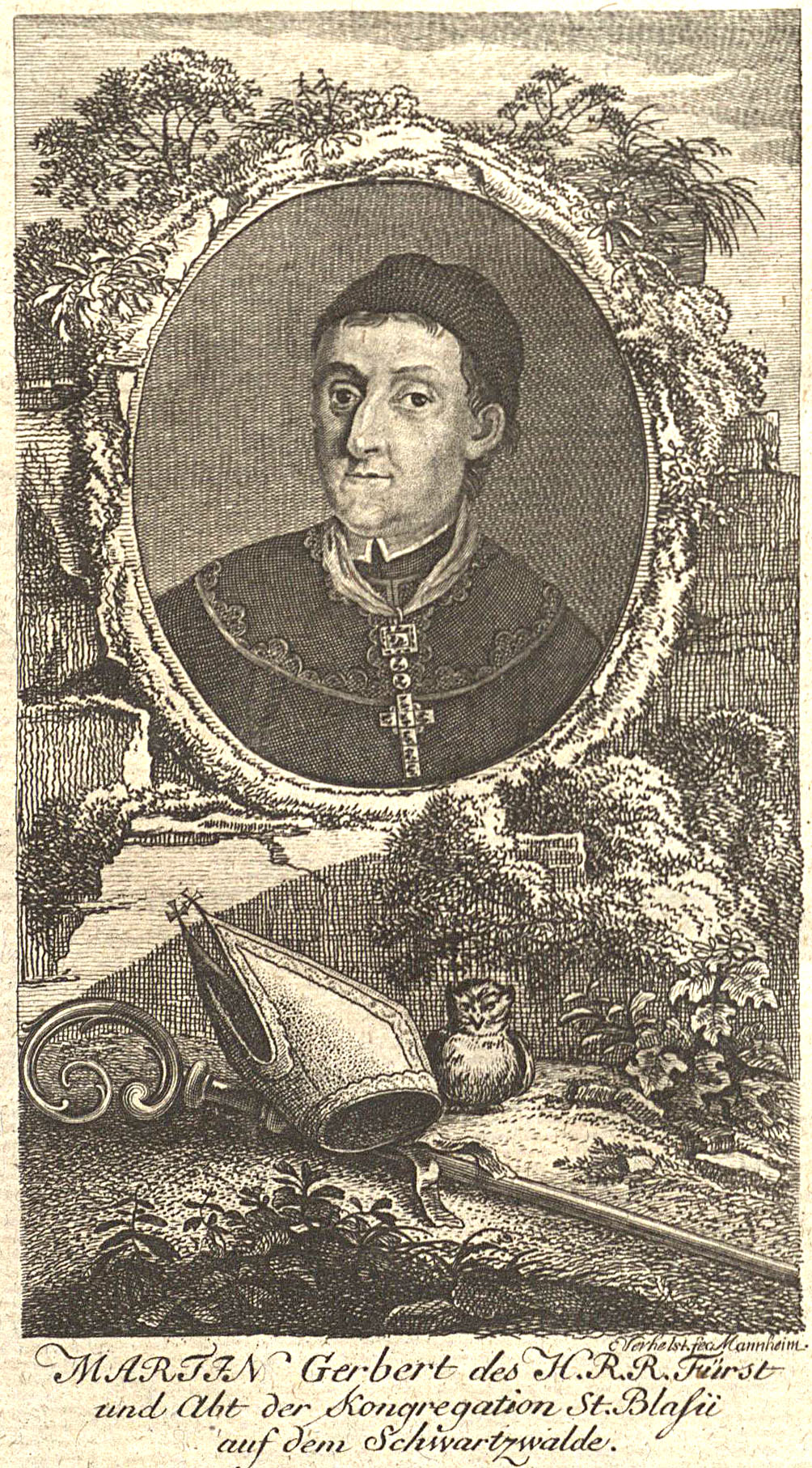
Martin Gerbert, portrait by Egid Verhelst in Allgemeine deutsche Bibliothek (1785)

Martin Gerbert (11 August 1720 – 3 May 1793), was a German theologian, historian and writer on music, belonged to the noble family of Gerbert von Hornau, and was born at Horb am Neckar, Württemberg, on 12 (or 11 or 13) August 1720.

== Life ==
He was educated at Freiburg im Breisgau, at Klingnau in Switzerland and at the Benedictine St. Blaise's Abbey in the Black Forest, where in 1737 he took the vows. In 1744 he was ordained priest, and immediately afterwards appointed professor, first of philosophy and later of theology. Between 1754 and 1764 he published a series of theological treatises, their main tendency being to modify the rigid scholastic system by an appeal to the Fathers, notably Augustine; from 1759 to 1762 he travelled in Germany, Italy and France, mainly with a view to examining the collections of documents in the various monastic libraries. In 1764 he was elected prince-abbot of St Blaise's, and proved himself a model ruler both as abbot and prince.

His examination of archives during his travels had awakened in him a taste for historical research, and under his rule St. Blaise's became a notable centre of the methodical study of history; it was here that Marquard Herrgott wrote his Monumenta domus Austriacae, of which the first two volumes were edited, for the second edition, by Gerbert, who also published a Codex epistolaris Rudolphi I., Romani regis (1772) and De Rudolpho Suevico comite de Rhinfelden, duce et rege, deque ejus familia (1785) (cf. Rudolf of Rheinfelden).

It was, however, in sacramental theology, liturgiology, and notably ecclesiastical music that Gerbert was mainly interested. In 1774 he published two volumes De cantu et musica sacra; in 1777, Monumenta veteris liturgiae Alemannicae; and in 1784, in three volumes, Scriptores ecclesiastici de musica sacra, a collection of the principal writers on church music from the 3rd century till the invention of printing. The materials for this work he had gathered during his travels, and although it contains many textual errors, its publication has been of great importance for the history of music, by preserving writings which might either have perished or remained unknown. His interest in music led to his acquaintance with the composer Gluck, who became his intimate friend.

As a prince of the Empire Gerbert was devoted to the interests of the house of Austria; as a Benedictine abbot he was opposed to Emperor Joseph II's church policy. In the Febronian controversy he had early taken a mediating attitude, and it was largely due to his influence that Bishop Hontheim had been induced to retract his extreme views. In 1768 St. Blaise's abbey, with the library and church, was burnt to the ground, and the splendid new church which rose on the ruins of the old (1783) remained until its destruction by fire in 1874, at once a monument of Gerbert's taste in architecture and of his Habsburg sympathies.

It was at his request that it was made the mausoleum of all the Austrian princes buried outside Austria, whose remains were solemnly transferred to its vaults. In connexion with its consecration he published his Historia Nigrae Silvae, ordinis S. Benedicti coloniae (3 vols, St Blasien, 1783). Gerbert, who was beloved and respected by Catholics and Protestants alike, died in St. Blasien on 3 May 1793.
