= Böck =

Surname list

Böck may refer to:

- Helmut Böck (skier) (1931–2025), German Nordic skier
- Johann Michael Böck (1743–1793), German actor
- Ludwig Böck (1902–1960), German skier

== See also ==
- Bock (disambiguation)
