= Mühringen =

Quarter of Horb am Neckar, Baden-Württemberg, Germany

Coordinates: 48.4188°N 8.7558°E

Mühringen is a district of Horb am Neckar. The village is located approximately 8 kilometres (5.0 mi) from the main town in the valley of the Eyach. Mühringen has 988 inhabitants as of July 2024.

There is a railway station of the Hohenzollerische Landesbahn in the valley; Mühringen is a station of a German Camino de Santiago.

== History ==
The first time Mühringen was mentioned in documents was May 3, 786 C.E.

Mühringen has a Jewish cemetery, which lies in the forest east of the district.

Maximilian Berlitz, founder of Berlitz Language Schools, was born in Mühringen, Kingdom of Württemberg, April 14, 1852.
