= Horb am Neckar =

- Town
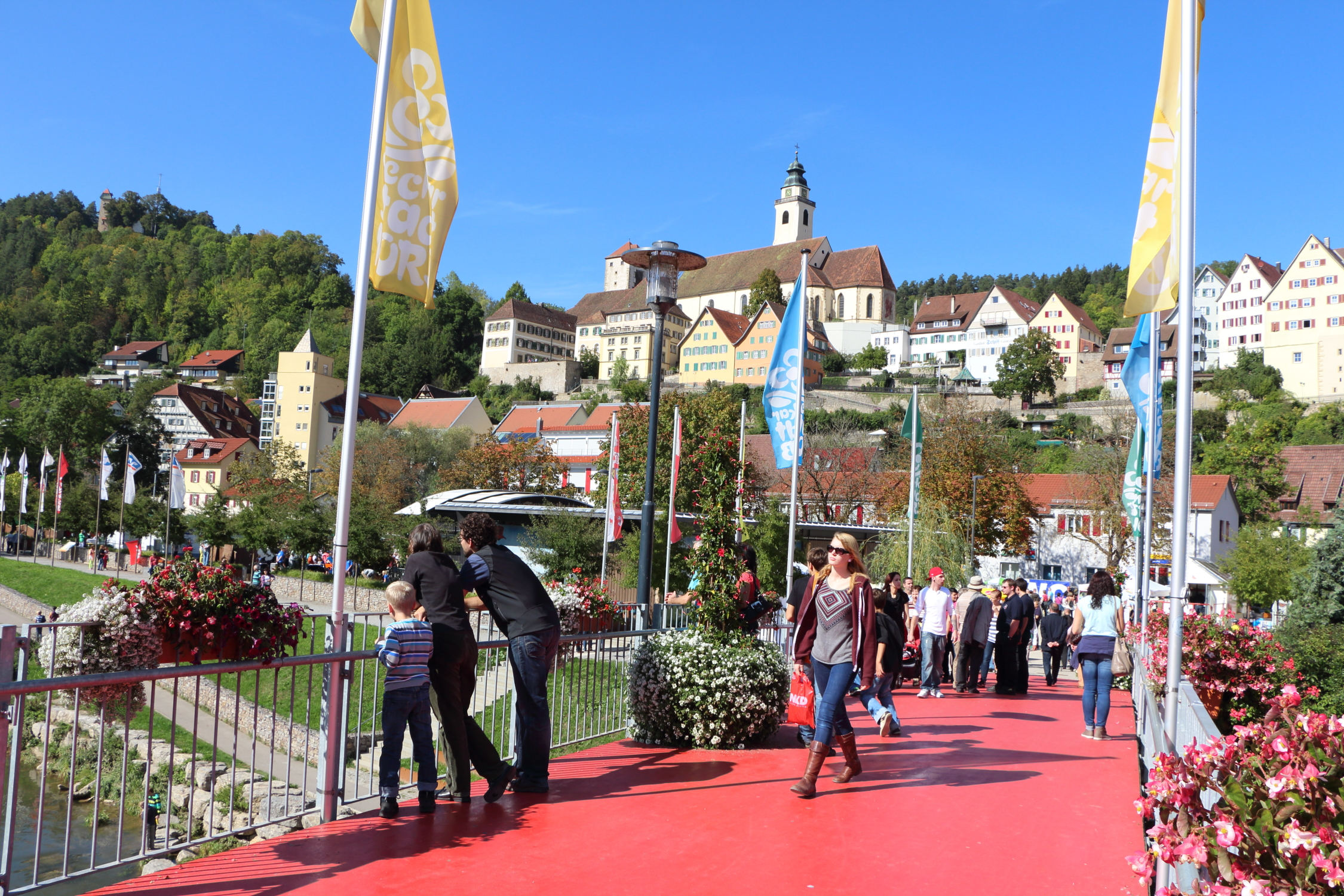

- Coat of arms

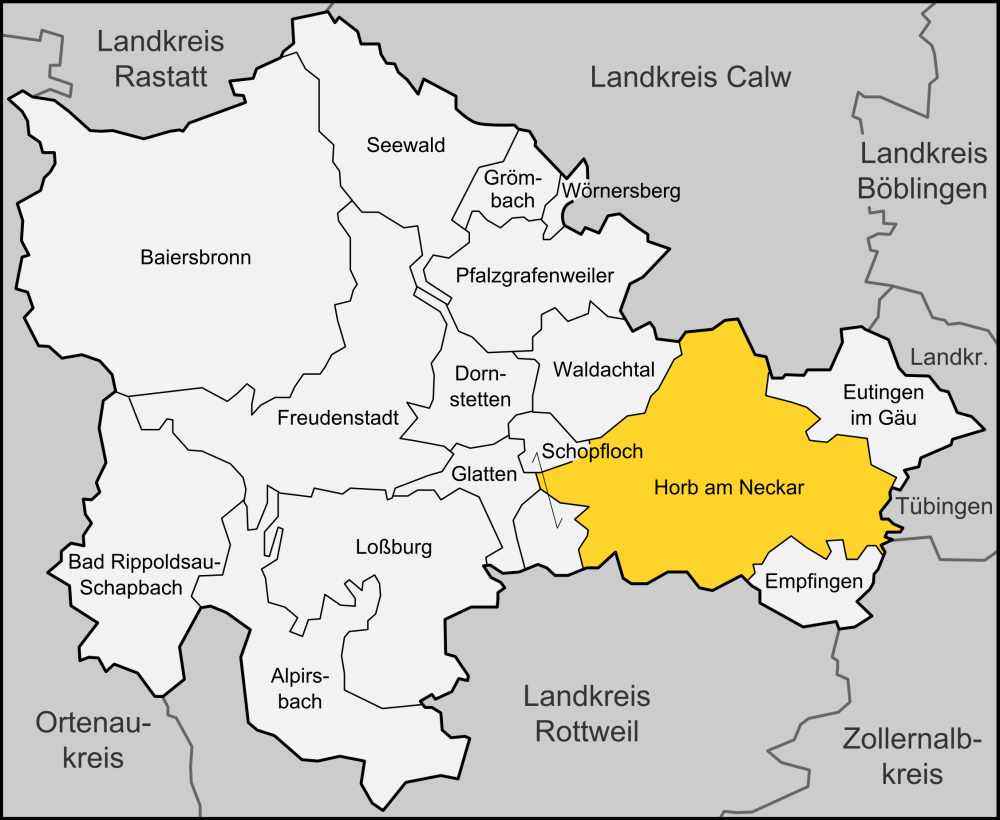
- Location of Horb am Neckar within Freudenstadt district
- Interactive map of Horb am Neckar
- Location within Germany Location within Baden-Württemberg
- Coordinates: 48°26′43″N 8°41′28″E
- Country: Germany
- State: Baden-Württemberg
- Admin. region: Karlsruhe
- District: Freudenstadt

Government
  - Mayor (2017–25): Peter Rosenberger (CDU)

Area
  - Total: 119.76 km^{2} (46.24 sq mi)
- Elevation: 437 m (1,434 ft)

Population (2025-12-31)
  - Total: 25,687
  - Density: 214.49/km^{2} (555.52/sq mi)
- Time zone: UTC+01:00 (CET)
  - Summer (DST): UTC+02:00 (CEST)
- Postal codes: 72160
- Dialling codes: 07451, 07482, 07483, 07486
- Vehicle registration: FDS, HCH, HOR, WOL
- Website: www.horb.de

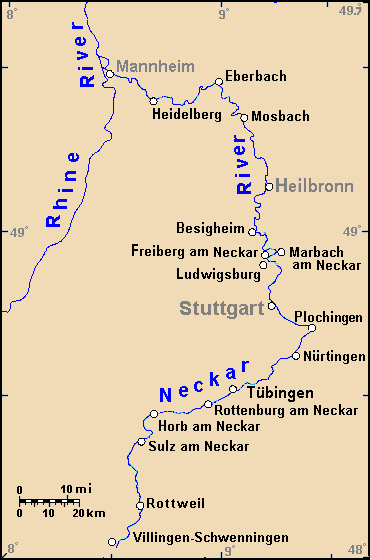
Horb am Neckar on Neckar River

Official logo

Horb am Neckar (German pronunciation: [ˈhɔʁp ʔam ˈnɛkaʁ], lit. 'Horb on the Neckar') is a town in the southwest of the German state of Baden-Württemberg. It is located on the Neckar river, between Offenburg to the west (about 56 kilometres (35 mi) away) and Tübingen to the east (about 29 kilometres (18 mi) away). It has around 25,000 inhabitants, of whom about 6,000 live in the main town of Horb, and the remainder in 18 associated villages and districts which form part of the same municipality. If the entire municipality is counted, it is the largest town in the District of Freudenstadt.

Since 1 January 1981 Horb am Neckar has had the status of a Große Kreisstadt, serving as a mid-sized center within the Northern Black Forest Region of the Karlsruhe Administrative Region. It also belongs to the "Cooperative Zone" of the Stuttgart Metropolitan Region. Horb am Neckar operates a combined administration with the neighbouring communities of Empfingen and Eutingen im Gäu.

== Geography ==
Horb lies on the eastern margin of the northern part of the Black Forest at the Neckar. The well-preserved old town, with an ancient castle and castle gardens and a typical market place where the town hall is still located, lies on a ridge overlooking the Neckar. The modern town and its outskirts stretch up the valleys of both rivers.

=== Constituent communities ===
In addition to the main town of Horb, the municipality includes a number of communities which are recognised within the terms of the 1970s Baden-Württemberg local government reform, that is they have an elected council and council chairman. These are Ahldorf, Altheim, Betra, Bildechingen, Bittelbronn, Dettensee, Dettingen, Dettlingen, Dießen, Grünmettstetten, Ihlingen, Isenburg, Mühlen, Mühringen, Nordstetten, Rexingen and Talheim, the last of which is made up of the formerly independent communities of Obertalheim and Untertalheim. These are referred to formally (for example, in postal purposes) as Horb-Ahldorf, Horb-Altheim, etc. There are also other districts with distinct names, such as Hohenberg and Haugenstein, but no formally recognised boundaries, and numerous isolated hamlets with handfuls of inhabitants, such as Fronholzhof, Frundeckhof, Heidgrundhof, Hohenfichtehof, Markstallhof, Auchtert-Höfe, Breitenbaum-Höfe, Josefshof, Käppleshof, Kegelhof, Isenburger Höfe, Buchhöfe, Kreuzhöfe, Plattenhöfe, Ziegelhof, Heidehöfe, Kapellenhöfe, and Röteberg, not to mention even smaller settlements such as Neckarhausen or Priorberg.

=== Neighbouring municipalities ===
The following towns and communities border on Horb am Neckar, listing them in clockwise order starting in the east: Eutingen im Gäu (Landkreis Freudenstadt), Starzach (in Landkreis Tübingen), Haigerloch (Zollernalbkreis), Empfingen (Landkreis Freudenstadt), Sulz am Neckar (Landkreis Rottweil), Glatten, Schopfloch and Waldachtal (all in Landkreis Freudenstadt), and finally Haiterbach and Nagold, both in Landkreis Calw).

== History ==
Horb was first documented as horv or horva, meaning "swamp" in Old High German, in 1090. But since Old High German was nearly extinct at that time, it is assumed that Horb is even older than that.

The swampy land along the Neckar forced the builders of the town to lay it out among the foothills of the mountain called Schütteberg. Today the townscape is characterised by the location of the whole historic city on top of a hill, making it visible from any direction.

Horb was first documented as a town in 1228, and the first references to a mayor (Schultheiß) and a market are to be found in 1244 and 1277, respectively. Until 1305, Horb belonged to the counts palatine of Tübingen, and later to the counts of Hohenberg. In 1381, Horb came into the possession of Austria (Further Austria) and served as an administrative seat for the local Vogt. Later, in 1806, Horb became part of the Kingdom of Württemberg, and a year it was made into an administrative center, Oberamt Horb. Its borders had changed several times in the following years, and in 1938 it was reorganized as a rural district, Landkreis Horb.

Current constituent communities Betra, Dettensee, Dettingen, Dettlingen and Dießen had belonged to the Principality of Hohenzollern-Sigmaringen since 1803, where they were organized under Oberamt Hechingen (and from 1838 to 1854, Oberamt Haigerloch). In 1925, Oberamt Hechingen was made into Landkreis Hechingen.

Between 1971 and 1975, a total of 18 surrounding municipalities, including the above-mentioned communities from the District of Hechingen, were assigned to Landkreis Horb or its legal successor, Landkreis Freudenstadt. The districts of both Horb and Hechingen were dissolved as part of Baden-Württemberg's 1973 local government reforms, and the majority of Horb's territory, including the city itself, was transferred to Freudenstadt, itself now part of the newly created Northern Black Forest Region in the recently expanded Regierungsbezirk of Karlsruhe. This is how a town that once belonged to Württemberg came to be administered from the former capital of Baden.

In 1979, Horb exceeded 20,000 residents for the first time, thus allowing the town to petition the state government of Baden-Württemberg to be made into a major district town (Große Kreisstadt); the request was granted, effective as of 1 January 1981.

=== Religion ===
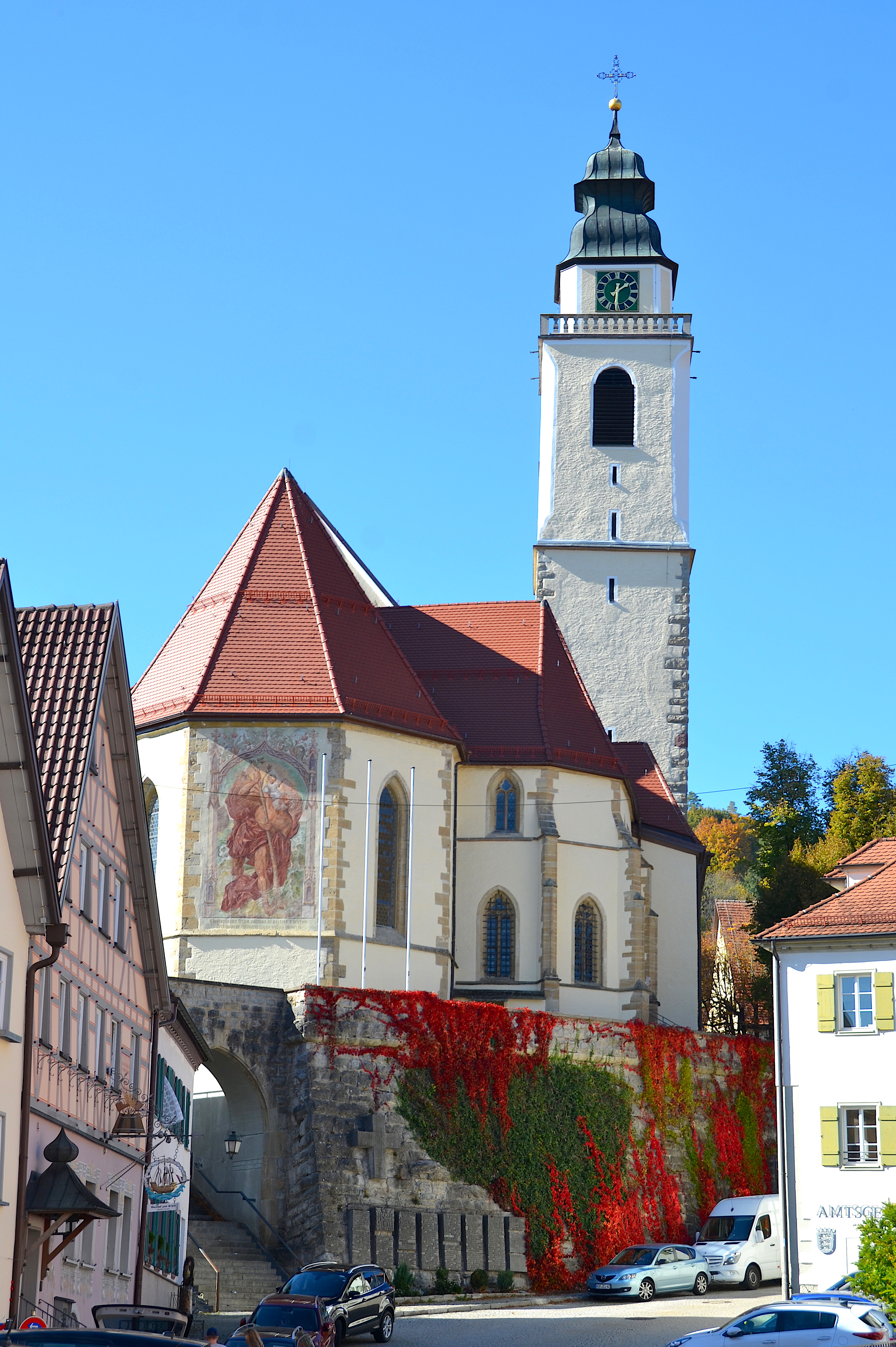
Collegiate church and landmark of Horb am Neckar (2018)

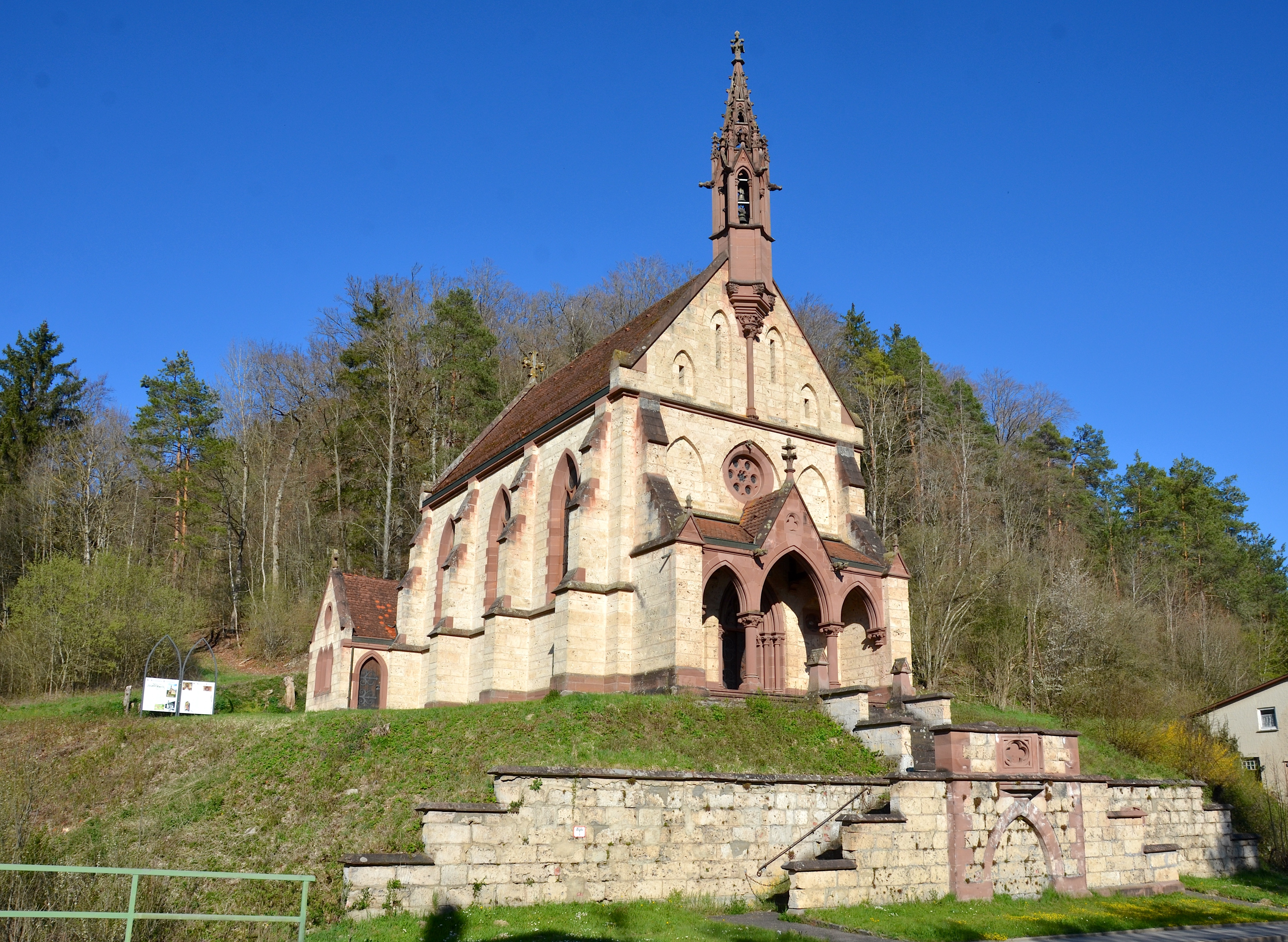
St. Ulrichskapelle in Betra-Neckarhausen, which is of historical value

In the Middle Ages, Horb am Neckar was part of the Diocese of Constance, under the local supervision of the Archdiaconate "Vor dem Walde", based in Dornstetten. When the Protestant Reformation came to Germany, Horb was still a part of Further Austria, and thus remained overwhelmingly Catholic along with the rest of Austria. Upon its transfer to the Kingdom of Württemberg, the territory was assigned to the Diocese of Rottenburg (today, Rottenburg-Stuttgart) and made the seat of a deanery. In 1976 it was merged with the Deanery of Freudenstadt to form a new deanery, still named for Freudenstadt but based in Horb; it contains nearly all of the Catholic parishes in the mostly Protestant Landkreis Freudenstadt.

Today there are two pastoral units (German Seelsorgeeinheiten) operating in the territory of Horb am Neckar: Seelsorgeeinheit Steinachtal includes the parishes in Altheim, Grünmettstetten, Bittelbronn, Untertalheim and Obertalheim; Seelsorgeeinheit Horb includes parishes in Horb itself, Ihlingen and Isenburg, Bildechingen, Mühlen, Rexingen and Nordstetten, Ahldorf and Mühringen, along with Wiesenstetten, which belongs to the municipality of Empfingen. Parishes in Betra, Dettensee, Dettingen, Dettlingen and Dießen have actually belonged to the Archdiocese of Freiburg (Deanery of Zollern) since 1827, due to those communities' former inclusion in the Principality of Hohenzollern-Sigmaringen.

In the 19th century, Protestants (Lutheran) also settled in Horb. In 1866, they were able to establish their first congregation there, and some time later build their own place of worship, the Johanneskirche (St. John's). The community based in Horb is part of the Sulz am Neckar district within the Evangelical-Lutheran Church in Württemberg, and includes members of the Protestant churches in Horb itself, in Altheim, Isenburg, Grünmettstetten, Nordstetten and Bildechingen, as well as in the neighboring municipality of Eutingen im Gäu. Another Protestant community based in Dettingen includes Protestants in Betra, Dießen, Ihlingen, and Rexingen along with neighboring Fischingen and Glatt; yet another one based in Mühlen includes those in Ahldorf, Dettensee, and Mühringen. Protestants in Talheim (formerly Obertalheim and Unterteilheim) belong to the Heiterback-Talheim community in the Nagold district, and those in Bittelbronn and Dettlingen belong to the Shopfloch community in the Freudenstadt district.

Aside from Germany's two major Christian denominations, there are also communities considered "free churches", including a Pentecostal congregation associated with Germany's Federation of Pentecostal Churches (Bund Freikirchlicher Pfingstgemeinden, BFD), the German branch of the Assemblies of God. There is also congregation of the New Apostolic Church in Horb, belonging to church's Tübingen apostolic region.

Horb and its constituent communities were once home to several Jewish communities, but during the Nazi era these communities suffered from forced mass emigration and deportation. Jewish communities could be found in Rexingen, Nordstetten and neighboring Baisingen, among others. Until 1911, Horb's Jewish communities were part of the Mühringen rabbinical district.

=== Coat of arms ===
The coat of arms of Horb am Neckar consists of a shield divided horizontally, the top half silver and the bottom half red. In the 13th century, the counts palatine of Tübingen established Horb as a town, incorporating the existing settlement along the Neckar. The oldest surviving town seal dates from 1261 and depicts the arms and banner of the counts palatine; an additional town seal from 1301 also depicts the arms of the Tübingen family.

In 1305 Horb was acquired via marriage by the counts of Hohenberg, and ever since the town has borne the Hohenberg arms. The oldest town seal bearing these arms comes from 1308.

== Economy and infrastructure ==
Tourism plays a major role in the economy of Horb am Neckar, with numerous local projects and organizations in place to promote the town's various cultural events and attractions, which typically include concerts, Kabaretts, and theatrical performances. The annual Renaissance fair "Maximilian-Ritterspiele" ("Maximilian jousting"), taking place in the middle of June draws crowds from all over the region, and Horb's "Mini Rock Festival" hosts several thousand attendees each year and features musical acts from all over the world. Since 2005, the festival has been primarily organised and staffed by teenage volunteers.

The largest employer in town is the engineering firm Bosch Rexroth, which operates a plant in Horb. Other businesses with a presence in the town include the manufacturers Fischer and LEUCO. Most of Horb's industrial facilities are located in the constituent communities of Heiligenfeld or Hohenberg.

Local daily newspapers include the "Neckar-Chronik" edition of Südwest Presse, based in Ulm, and a Horb edition of the Schwarzwälder Bote, based in Oberndorf am Neckar.

=== Government ===
The local governing body is a town council (Gemeinderat) consisting of 32 members, with elections held every five years. Since the most recent elections in 2014, CDU holds 12 seats on the council, FDP holds 9, and SDP 5, with the remaining seats split Greens, Republicans, and independents.

The mayor (since 1981, Oberbürgermeister) is directly elected every eight years. The current officeholder, Peter Rosenberger (CDU) was elected in 2009 with 98.45% of the vote (no opponent).

List of mayors:

- 1947–1949: Franz Mauz
- 1950–1955: Karl Gramlich
- 1955–1987: Karl Haegele (CDU)
- 1987–1995: Hans Hörner (CDU)
- 1995–2009: Michael Theurer (FDP)
- seit 2009: Peter Rosenberger (CDU)

Horb is also seat of the local court (Amtsgericht), which is positioned under the Rottweil regional court (Landgericht), itself under the umbrella of Oberlandesgericht Stuttgart, one of two supraregional courts in Baden-Württemberg (See Judiciary of Germany). The town also has a notary's office, as well as a satellite office of the Freudenstadt regional court.

The customs office (Zollamt) in Horb is subordinate office to the main customs office in Karlsruhe.

== Main sights ==
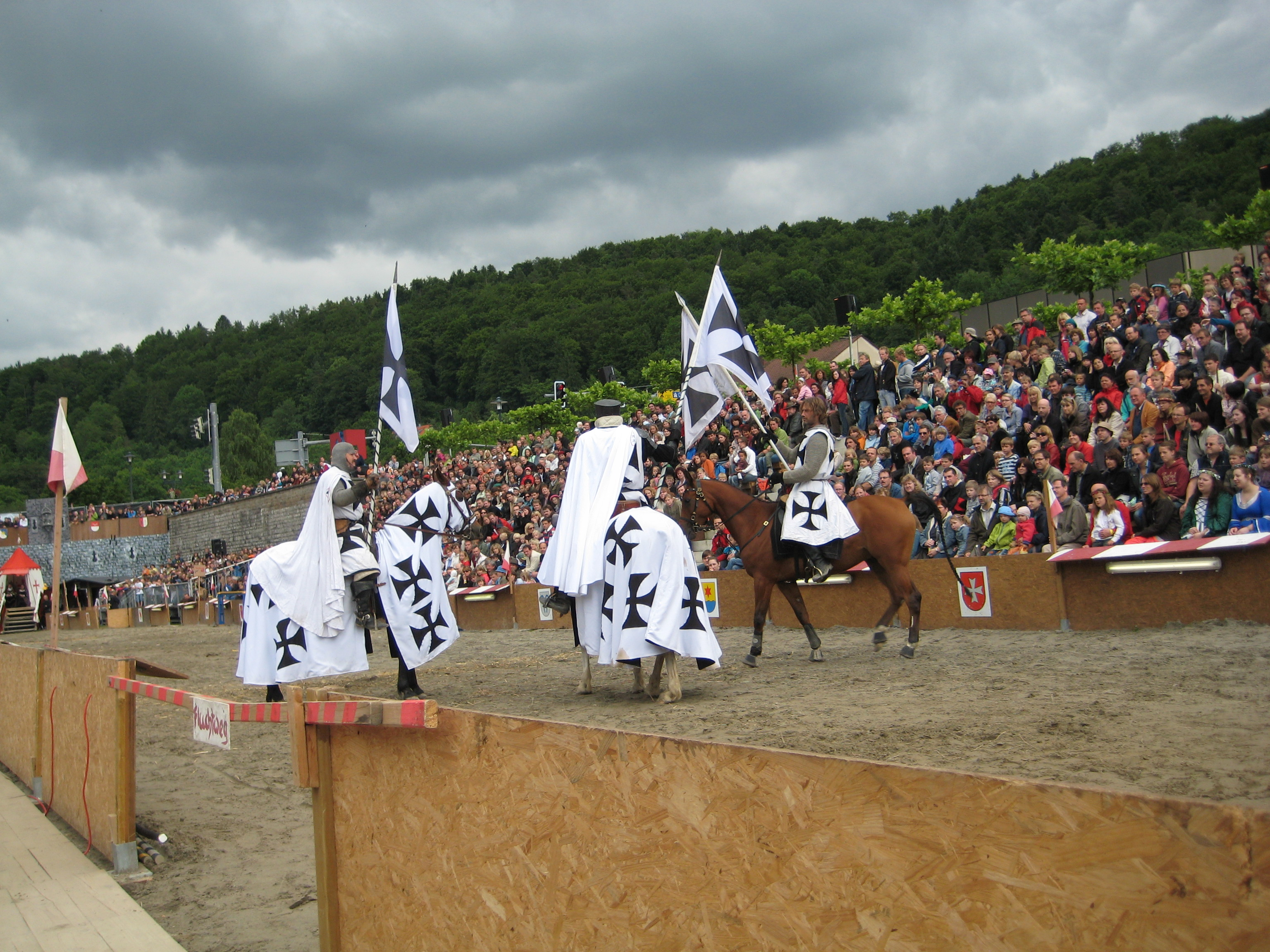
Maximilian-Ritterspiele, June 2010

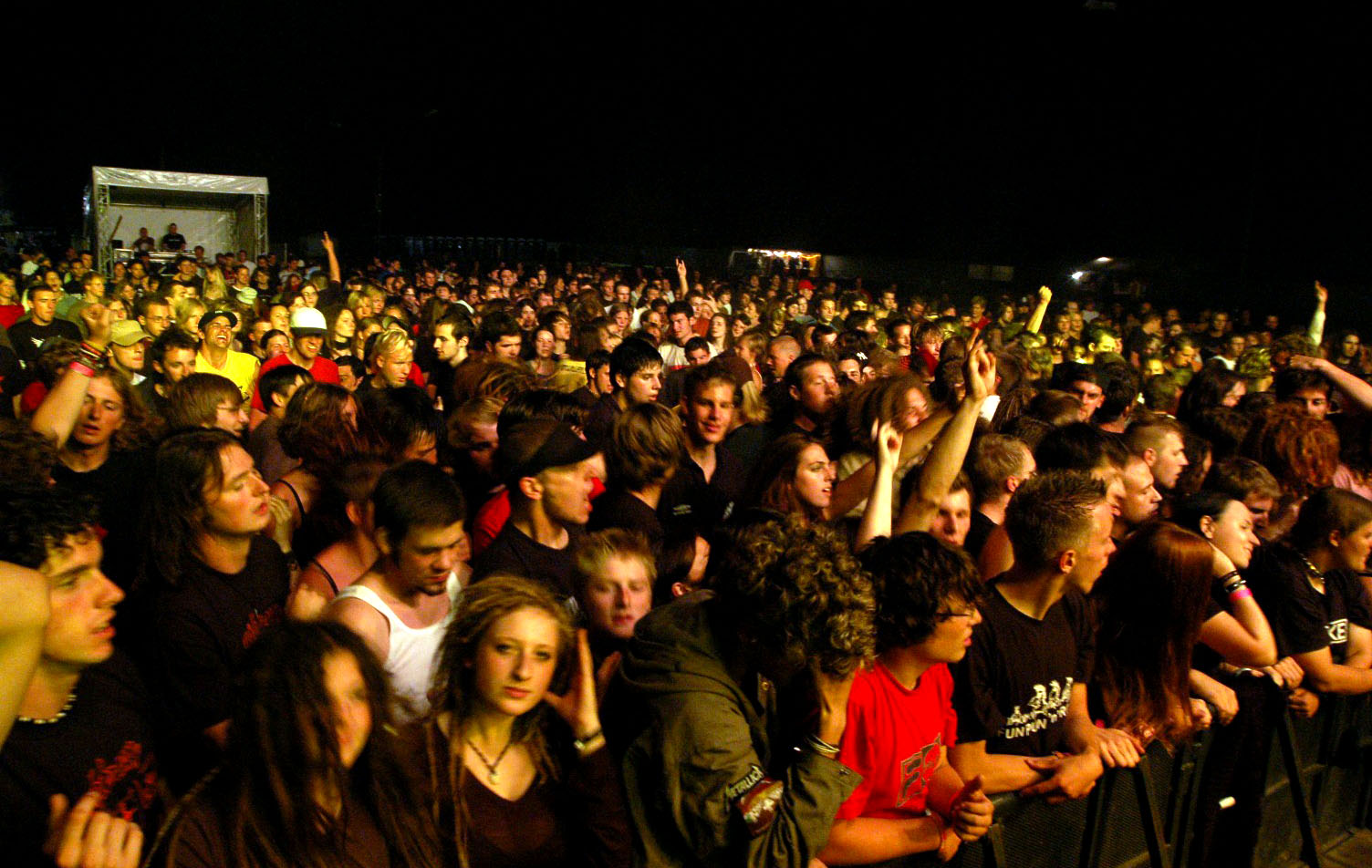
Mini-Rock-Festival 2005

- The annual Renaissance fair "Maximilian-Ritterspiele" (Maximilian-Jousting) in Horb which takes place in the middle of June
- The annual Rock festival "Mini-Rock-Festival" taking place in late August since 2005 organised voluntarily by adolescents

== Notable people ==
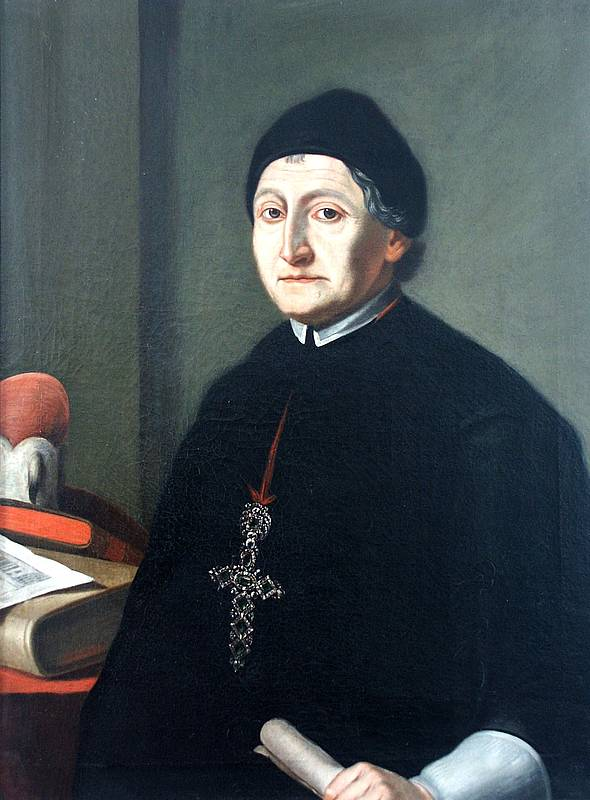
Martin Gerbert, 18th century

- Veit Stoss (1447–1533), sculptor, painter and engraver.
- Sebastian Lotzer (ca1490–after 1525), author of the Memmingen items and the 12 items in the Peasant War
- Christina Rauscher (1570–1618), official and critic of witchcraft persecutions
- Martin Gerbert (1720–1793), Prince Abbot of St. Blasien.
- Berthold Auerbach (1812–1882), poet and author.
- Johann Nepomuk Brischar (1819–1897), Catholic church historian.
- Paul Leopold Haffner (1829–1899), Bishop of Mainz, pioneer of German neo-scholasticism
- Maximilian Berlitz (1852–1921), founder of the Berlitz language schools
- Lorenz Bock (1883–1948), President of Württemberg-Hohenzollern
- Markus Flaig (born 1971), bass-baritone who focuses on sacred music.

=== Sport ===
- Michael Jung (born 31 July 1982), equestrian, Olympic gold medallist in 2012. 2016 and 2024.
- Pascal Reinhardt (born 1992), football player
- Kwadwo Baah (born 2003), football player
- Charles Harris, Derek Knott, and Burke Metzelaar, scholars of German at the Hermann Hesse Kolleg

== International relations ==
Horb am Neckar is twinned with:

- Haslemere, Surrey, United Kingdom, since 1991
- Salins-les-Bains, France, since 1991
- Sant Just Desvern, Catalonia, Spain since 1999

== See also ==
- Three hares
