= Rolf Bock =

German football manager (1937–2022)

Personal information
- Date of birth: 5 February 1937
- Date of death: 17 February 2022 (aged 85)

Managerial career
- Years: Team
- 1981: Borussia Dortmund
- 1982–1983: Rot-Weiss Essen

Rolf Bock (5 February 1937 – 17 January 2022) was a German football manager who managed Borussia Dortmund and Rot-Weiss Essen.
