= Kerstin Przygodda =

German politician (born 1962)

Member of the Bundestag from Schleswig-Holstein
- Incumbent
- Assumed office 2025

Personal details
- Born: 15 August 1962 (age 63) Eutin, Schleswig-Holstein, Germany
- Party: Alternative for Germany

Kerstin Przygodda (born 15 August 1962) is a German politician from the Alternative for Germany (AfD). She was elected to the German Bundestag in the 2025 German federal election via the state list of the AfD Schleswig-Holstein.

== Political career ==
Przygodda initially worked as an advisor to the family policy spokesman of the AfD parliamentary group in the Bundestag for more than seven years before she ran for the first time in the 2025 federal election. In the Lübeck constituency, she came fourth with 15.5%, and she managed to enter the Bundestag via fourth place on the AfD Schleswig-Holstein state list.

== Political positions ==
Her political focus is on issues such as internal security, reducing bureaucracy and limiting illegal immigration. She is also committed to anchoring family friendliness more firmly in the constitution and is clearly in favor of recognizing only two genders.
