= Bad Ben =

- Directed by: Tom Fanslau
- Written by: Tom Fanslau
- Screenplay by: Tom Fanslau
- Produced by: Tom Fanslau
- Starring: Tom Fanslau (1–present); Scott Tomlinson (10–11)
- Distributed by: Amazon Prime (2016–2020); Breaking Glass Productions (2020–present)
- Country: United States
- Language: English

Bad Ben is the name of a web series of independent found footage horror comedy films, the first of which released in 2016. The series has been written and directed by Tom Fanslau under the pen name of Nigel Bach. As of 2024, there are fifteen Bad Ben films. A sixteenth installment is being worked on but with no scheduled release date.

A video game based on the series has also been released.

== Films ==
To date, there are fifteen films in the Bad Ben series. A short film titled "Bad Ben's Night Before Christmas" was released in 2019. A television series made up of three episodes, Tom Riley: Paranormal Investigator, was released between 2018 and 2019.

=== Bad Ben (2016) ===
Bad Ben was released directly to the Internet on October 5, 2016. Fanslau stars as Tom Riley, an unsuspecting homeowner who has started to experience strange and inexplicable phenomena in his new home. He finds that he is unable to enter the basement, from which strange smells emerge. He uncovers evidence that this may be linked to an entity called "Bad Ben" and that his own life is in danger.

Bach had initially approached several producers with his concept. Per the director, he was met with interest but was unable to successfully convince them to bring the project to fruition. He eventually chose to create the film himself. Bach filmed Bad Ben on a budget of $300 with his cell phone and security cameras in his own home on Steelmanville Road in New Jersey, which he would also use for a filming location in future films. Per The Philadelphia Inquirer, the movie has made Bach approximately $110,000 from Amazon streaming revenue and has been seen over a million times as of 2021.

=== Steelmanville Road (2017) ===
Steelmanville Road is a prequel to Bad Ben. It was released in 2017 and follows a married couple who moves into what they believe is the house of their dreams, only to find that the opposite is true.

=== Badder Ben (2017) ===
Badder Ben, also known as Badder Ben: The Final Chapter, is the third film in the series. It was released in 2017 and centers upon a group of paranormal investigators seeking to learn the truth about what happened on Steelmanville Road.

=== Bad Ben: The Mandela Effect (2018) ===
Bad Ben: The Mandela Effect was released during 2018 and posits what would happen if the events of the first film also occurred in parallel universes.

=== The Crescent Moon Clown (2018) ===
The Crescent Moon Clown, released in 2018, features a new family moving into the home on Steelmanville Road and discovering a seemingly evil clown doll secreted away in a box.

=== Bad Ben: The Way In (2019) ===
Bad Ben: The Way In was released in 2019. Nigel Bach returns as Tom Riley, who is asked to return to his former home and rid it of all evil, this time facing nine demons.

=== Bad Ben: The Haunted Highway (2019) ===
Bad Ben: The Haunted Highway was first released in 2019 through the Internet. The movie additionally screened at The Unnamed Footage Festival in San Francisco, California during March 2022. The film's plot follows protagonist Tom Riley as he works for a rideshare service, only to pick up terrifying passengers.

=== Bad Ben: Pandemic (2020) ===
Bad Ben: Pandemic was released in 2020. The story focuses on Tom Riley, who is now working as an online consultant for people wondering if they are experiencing the supernatural.

=== Bad Ben: Benign (2021) ===
The ninth film in the series was released to the internet on October 26, 2021 through Breaking Glass Pictures. Entitled Bad Ben: Benign, the film once again follows Riley as he tries to cleanse his home of evil, this time potentially facing a demon more powerful than anything he's yet faced.

=== Bad Ben: Eulogy (2022) ===
The tenth film in the series, titled Bad Ben: Eulogy, was released on Bad Ben TV on June 30, 2022. This film presents a video eulogy for Tom Riley compiled of new footage by video podcaster Jackson Scott, played by Scott Tomlinson.

=== Bad Ben: Undead (2022) ===
Bad Ben: Undead was released on Bad Ben TV on October 27, 2022. Both Bach and Tomlinson reprise their roles as Tom Riley and Jackson Scott, who team up during a zombie apocalypse.

=== Bad Ben: Alien Agenda (2023) ===
Released in 2023. The film picks up after the last one and follows Tom and Jackson as they try to stop two alien species from going to war.

=== Bad Ben: The Dracula Situation (2024) ===
The thirteenth film of the franchise, Bad Ben: The Dracula Situation (sometimes referred to as The Vampire Situation) this installment has Tom Riley return to Steelmanville Road with his old house once again and finds out the previous owner rented it out to Dracula who brings havoc upon Steelmanville Road.

=== Bad Ben: Frankenstein (2024) ===
Bad Ben: Frankenstein is the fourteenth film in the series and is set to release on July 4, 2024.

=== Bad Ben: Poltergeist (2025) ===
The fifteenth installment of the Bad Ben series, Bad Ben: Poltergeist, was scheduled to release in 2025, originally the film was titled Bad Ben: Not Your Home and was to be a Fourth wall take on the series, following the actual Nigel Bach facing off against the paranormal for mocking them for the past 14 films. It was intended to be the final film of the series but due to overwhelming demand for Bach to continue the series, the previous plans were scrapped. The planned October 2025 release was pushed forward to a Summer 2025 release date instead.

== Release ==
Bach has released fourteen films in the Bad Ben series, beginning with the titular 2016 film. The films premiered on Amazon Prime, where they were available for viewing until 2020, when he removed the films due to Amazon lowering his earnings. The films were later re-released through Breaking Glass Pictures.

As of 2024, all Bad Ben films are available to stream on the Bad Ben TV Roku channel.

== Game ==
A game adaptation entitled Bad Ben has been produced. It was developed by Bach alongside corpsepile and DreadXP and was released to Itch.io in October 2021. Bach provides the voice for the game protagonist. Players lead his character through a house that he purchased via a sheriff's sale and as he experiences strange, supernatural occurrences.

== Reception ==
Bloody Disgusting rated the first film in the series favorably, noting its limitations while also stating "The plot may not sound like much to most horror movie veterans, as there are countless other scary stories with a similar setup, but trust me when I say that watching a grumpy middle-aged man refuse to be harassed by supernatural forces hell-bent on ruining his investment is one hell of a fun ride." They further remarked on the sequels, of which there were three at the time of the article, praising Badder Ben by writing "Adding a sizable amount of humor to a legitimately clever script, this remarkable third entry surpasses the other films in charm and scope, but by no means is it a flawless endeavor. " Vox compared the film favorably to The Blair Witch Project, as "The setting is totally different, but Bad Ben marries a do-it-yourself-attitude with an impeccably realized atmosphere in a way that echoes found footage’s breakout movie."

Dread Central rated the seventh film The Haunted Highway favorably, stating that it was "campy, hilarious, and has surprisingly effective moments. This isn’t one that’ll scare you, but it’ll definitely have you in a good mood." Film Threat praised Benign, writing "While the narrative will confuse anyone not already up to date with the franchise, the flick still offers a decent amount of elements to hold their attention. Bach is rock solid as the sole focus of the story, while his editing and effects skills prove to be top-notch."
