= Lorenz Bock =

German lawyer and politician

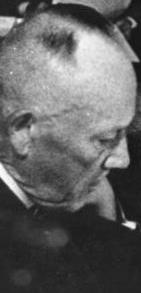
- Lorenz Bock, July 1948

President of Württemberg-Hohenzollern
- In office July 8, 1947 – August 3, 1948
- Preceded by: Position established
- Succeeded by: Gebhard Müller

Personal details
- Born: August 12, 1883 Nordstetten, Germany
- Died: August 3, 1948 (aged 64) Rottweil, Germany
- Party: CDU (after WWII)
- Other political affiliations: Centre Party (before WWII)
- Occupation: Lawyer, Politician

Military service
- Years of service: 1915–1918
- Rank: Soldier
- Unit: German Army
- Battles/wars: World War I

Lorenz Bock (August 12, 1883, in Nordstetten – August 3, 1948, in Rottweil) was a German lawyer and politician. He was first with the Center Party, later with the Christian Democratic Union (CDU).

== Life and career ==
Lorenz Bock was born on August 12, 1883, in Nordstetten, (today district of Horb am Neckar). After visiting the schools in Horb am Neckar and Rottweil, he studied from 1902 to 1907 jurisprudence at the Ludwig-Maximilians-Universität München and at the University of Tübingen. He graduated from the clerkship at the Amtsgericht in Riedlingen, the Landgericht in Ravensburg and with the public prosecution in Stuttgart. He worked since 1910 as a lawyer in Rottweil. From 1915 to 1918 he was a participant in the First World War. After the war Bock continued his career as a lawyer. In August 1944 he was arrested by the Gestapo. Lorenz Bock died on the evening of August 3, 1948, in Rottweil from the effects of intestinal paralysis.

== Politics ==
Bock joined already before the First World War, the Centre Party and was from 1919 to 1933 a member of the local council in Rottweil. He was in 1919 in the constituent assembly of the Free People's State of Württemberg. He co-worked in the formation of the new constitution. In the same year he was elected to the Parliament of Württemberg, where he stayed till 1933. From 1928 to 1933 he was chairman of the center faction in the parliament.

After Second World War, Bock participated in the founding of the CDU in Rottweil (district). He was a member of the Advisory State Assembly Württemberg-Hohenzollern in 1946 and was elected in 1947 to the Parliament of Württemberg-Hohenzollern, where he was a member to his death. On July 8, 1947, he was elected President of Würtemberg-Hohenzollern. He then formed a coalition of CDU, SPD and DVP. He also overtook the management of the treasury. Bock died later during his tenure. His successor as president was Gebhard Müller.
