= Helmut Wendelborn =

German politician

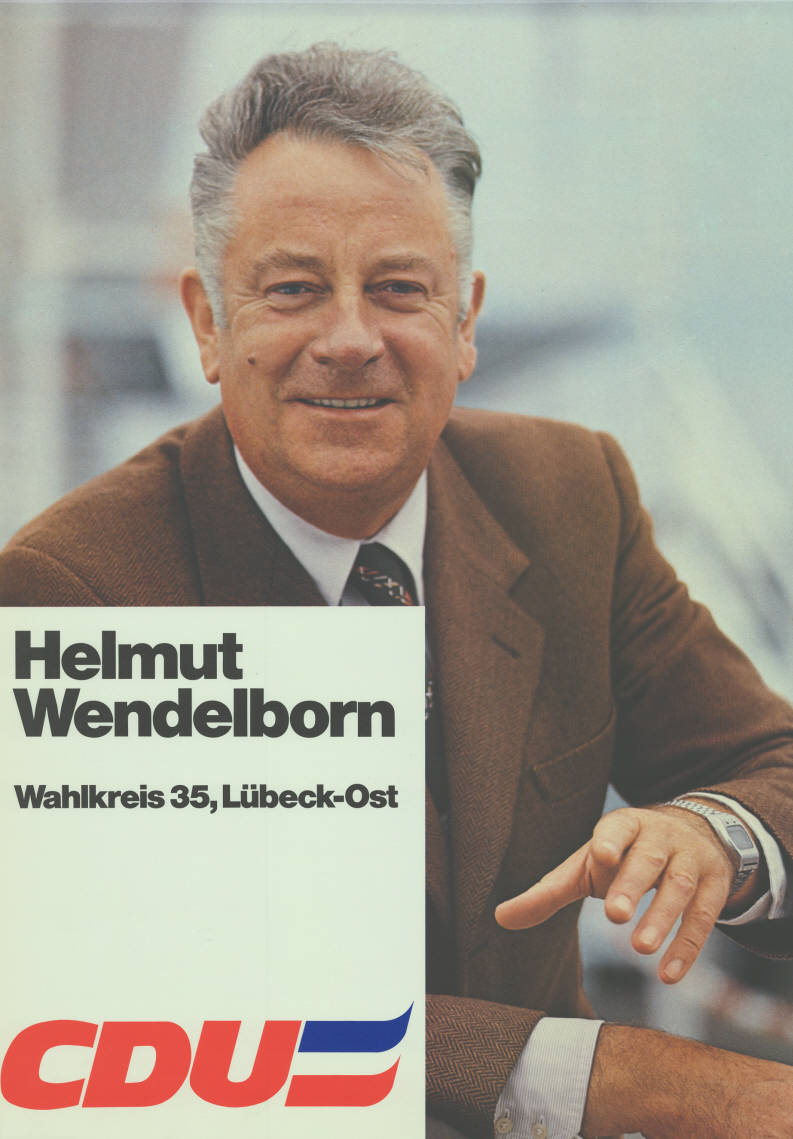
- Candidate poster for the state election in Schleswig-Holstein 1979

Member of the Bundestag
- In office 15 October 1957 – 19 October 1969
- In office 11 June 1971 – 22 September 1972

Personal details
- Born: 19 December 1926 Travemünde
- Died: 24 October 2003 (aged 76) Lübeck, Schleswig-Holstein, Germany
- Party: CDU

Helmut Wendelborn (19 December 1926 – 24 October 2003) was a German politician of the Christian Democratic Union (CDU) and former member of the German Bundestag.

== Life ==
Wendelborn was a member of the Bundestag from 1957 to 1972, initially above the constituency of Lübeck. In 1971, in the sixth term of office, he moved into the Bundestag as successor to Gerhard Stoltenberg via the Schleswig-Holstein state list.

== Literature ==
Herbst, Ludolf; Jahn, Bruno (2002). Vierhaus, Rudolf (ed.). Biographisches Handbuch der Mitglieder des Deutschen Bundestages. 1949–2002 [Biographical Handbook of the Members of the German Bundestag. 1949–2002] (in German). München: De Gruyter - De Gruyter Saur. p. 1715. ISBN 978-3-11-184511-1.
