= Bach House =

Bach House (in German Bachhaus) may refer to:

- One of the houses associated with the composer Johann Sebastian Bach, such as:
  - Bach House (Arnstadt), Kohlgasse 7, during his stay in Arnstadt Johann Sebastian Bach might have lived here with his aunt Elisabeth
  - Bach House (Eisenach), the first Bach museum, housed in a building which was presumed to be the actual birthplace of Johann Sebastian Bach
  - Bach House (Köthen)
  - Bach House (Weimar)
- The Emil Bach House in Chicago, lived in by Emil Bach
