= André Bock =

German politician (born 1973)

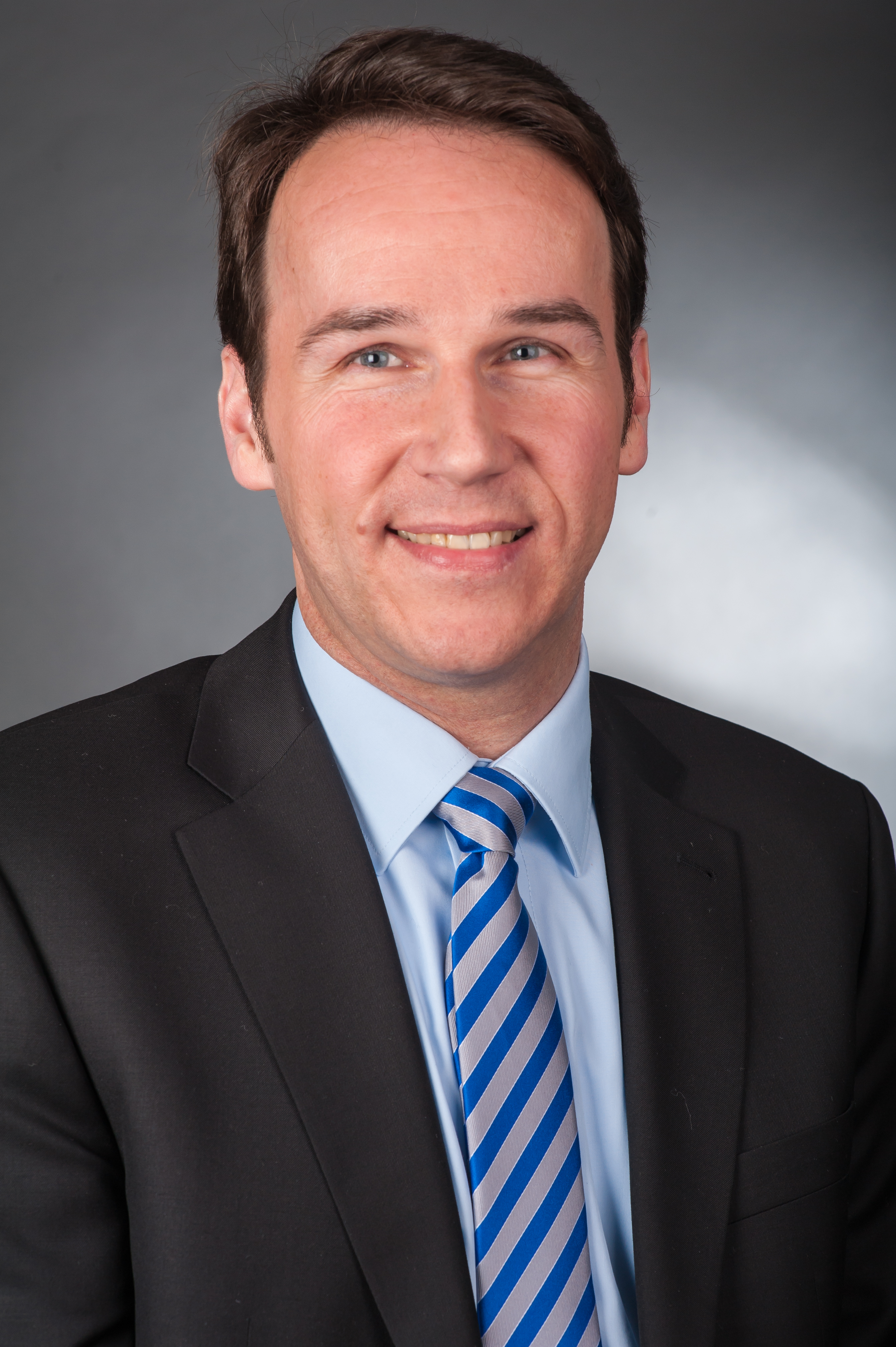
- Bock in 2013

Member of the Landtag of Lower Saxony
- Incumbent
- Assumed office 19 February 2013
- Constituency: Winsen

Personal details
- Born: 12 June 1973 (age 52)
- Party: Christian Democratic Union (since 1998)

André Bock (born 12 June 1973) is a German politician serving as a member of the Landtag of Lower Saxony since 2013. He is the chairman of the electoral scrutiny committee.
