= David Jenniches =

German politician (born 1977)

Member of the Landtag of Mecklenburg-Vorpommern
- Incumbent
- Assumed office 20 October 2026

Personal details
- Born: 1977 (age 48–49)
- Party: Alternative for Germany

David Jenniches (born 1977) is a German politician who was elected member of the Landtag of Mecklenburg-Vorpommern in 2026. He is the treasurer of the Alternative for Germany in Schwerin and the deputy treasurer of the AfD Mecklenburg-Vorpommern.
