= Paul Bromme =

German politician (1906–1975)

Member of the Bundestag
- In office 7 September 1949 – 7 September 1953

Personal details
- Born: 24 December 1906 Ronneburg
- Died: 2 February 1975 (aged 68)
- Party: SPD

Paul Bromme (24 December 1906 – 2 February 1975) was a German politician of the Social Democratic Party (SPD) and former member of the German Bundestag.

== Life ==
In the first legislative period (1949–1953) of the German Bundestag, Bromme was a member of the SPD for the Lübeck constituency. From 1954 to 1971 he was an SPD member of the state parliament of Schleswig-Holstein.

== Literature ==
Herbst, Ludolf; Jahn, Bruno (2002). Vierhaus, Rudolf (ed.). Biographisches Handbuch der Mitglieder des Deutschen Bundestages. 1949–2002 [Biographical Handbook of the Members of the German Bundestag. 1949–2002] (in German). München: De Gruyter - De Gruyter Saur. p. 1715. ISBN 978-3-11-184511-1.
