= Gabriele Hiller-Ohm =

German politician

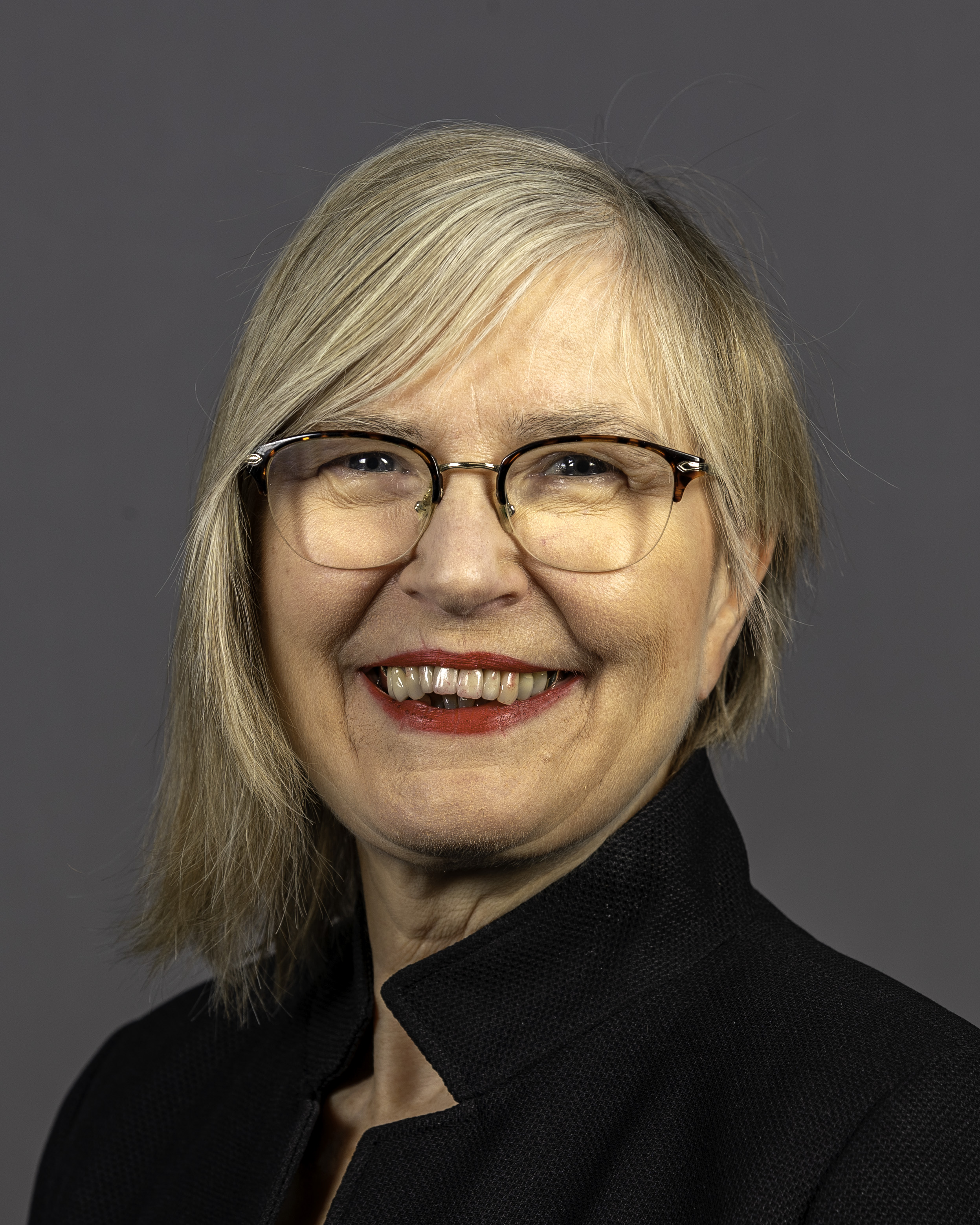
- Gabriele Hiller-Ohm in 2020

Member of the Bundestag
- Incumbent
- Assumed office 2002

Personal details
- Born: 28 February 1953 (age 73) Lübeck, West Germany (now Germany)
- Party: SPD
- Education: University of Hamburg

Gabriele Hiller-Ohm (née Ohm; born 28 February 1953 in Lübeck) is a German politician (SPD). She has been a member of the Bundestag since 2002. Since 2014, she has been the SPD parliamentary group's spokesperson for tourism policy.

== Life and work ==
After graduating from high school, Gabriele Hiller-Ohm first studied German studies, history, and pedagogy at the University of Hamburg. She then began training as an electrician, which she had to break off due to the insolvency of the teaching company. From 1982, she worked as an editor and in 1987, she moved to the Technical University of Applied Sciences Lübeck as a press and public relations officer. In 1997, she took over the management of the Technical University of Applied Sciences Lübeck's office for the participation in the "Leonardo Da Vinci" European vocational training and mobility programme.

Hiller-Ohm is divorced and has two children.

== Party ==
Gabriele Hiller-Ohm has been a member of the SPD since 1983. From 2008 to 2014, she was deputy chairwoman of the SPD district association of Lübeck. Since 2013, she has been chairwoman of the Lübeck Working Group of Social Democratic Women (ASF). Hiller-Ohm belongs to the left wing of the SPD. Within the SPD parliamentary faction, she is a member of the Parliamentary Left.

== Member of parliament ==
Gabriele Hiller-Ohm was a member of the parliament of the Hanseatic City of Lübeck from 1990 to 2002, and was chairwoman of the SPD parliamentary group there from 1999 to 2002.

She has been a member of the German Bundestag since 2002. She is a full member of the Committee for Labour and Social Affairs and the Committee for Tourism. In the 18th Bundestag she is a deputy member of the Committee for Food and Agriculture. Since 2014, Gabriele Hiller-Ohm has been chairman of the working group on tourism and thus spokeswoman for tourism policy of the SPD parliamentary group in the Bundestag. Since 2005, she has been deputy spokesperson of the Schleswig-Holstein state group within the SPD parliamentary group.

Gabriele Hiller-Ohm entered the Bundestag as a directly elected representative of the Lübeck constituency from 2002 to 2013. She received 50.8% of the first votes in her first federal election in 2002. In the 2005 federal election, she received 49.7% of the first votes here. In the 2009 federal election, she again received the direct mandate with 36.7% of the first votes. In the 2013 federal election, she reached 40.7% of the first votes.

In the 2017 federal election, she ran for her constituency's direct mandate again, but was defeated by the CDU candidate Claudia Schmidtke. Hiller-Ohm returned to the Bundestag via her party's state list.

Hiller-Ohm participates in the project "Transparent Members of Parliament" and regularly publishes her income and appointments.

== Political positions ==
Gabriele Hiller-Ohm is a firm opponent of combat missions of the Bundeswehr. In roll-call votes, she repeatedly voted against the majority of her parliamentary group. On the other hand, she voted in favor of humanitarian missions.

Hiller-Ohm has long campaigned for the introduction of the statutory minimum wage and for a pension without deductions from 63 after 45 contribution years. As the responsible rapporteur for the SPD parliamentary group in the Bundestag, she also lobbied for the quota of women on supervisory boards and for the Wage Justice Act.
