= Paul Bock =

German politician (1890–1968)

Member of the Bundestag
- In office 6 October 1953 – 6 October 1957

Personal details
- Born: 29 July 1890 Lübeck
- Died: 23 March 1968 (aged 77) Lübeck, Schleswig-Holstein, Germany
- Party: CDU

Paul Bock (July 29, 1890 – March 23, 1968) was a German politician of the Christian Democratic Union (CDU) and former member of the German Bundestag.

== Life ==
He was one of the founders of the CDU in Lübeck in 1945. Bock was a member of the Lübeck citizenship in 1946/47 and 1950/51. He was a member of the German Bundestag from 1953 to 1957. In parliament he represented the constituency of Lübeck.

== Literature ==
Herbst, Ludolf; Jahn, Bruno (2002). Vierhaus, Rudolf (ed.). Biographisches Handbuch der Mitglieder des Deutschen Bundestages. 1949–2002 [Biographical Handbook of the Members of the German Bundestag. 1949–2002] (in German). München: De Gruyter - De Gruyter Saur. p. 1715. ISBN 978-3-11-184511-1.
