= Maximilian Berlitz =

German-American linguist, language teacher, and writer (1852–1921)

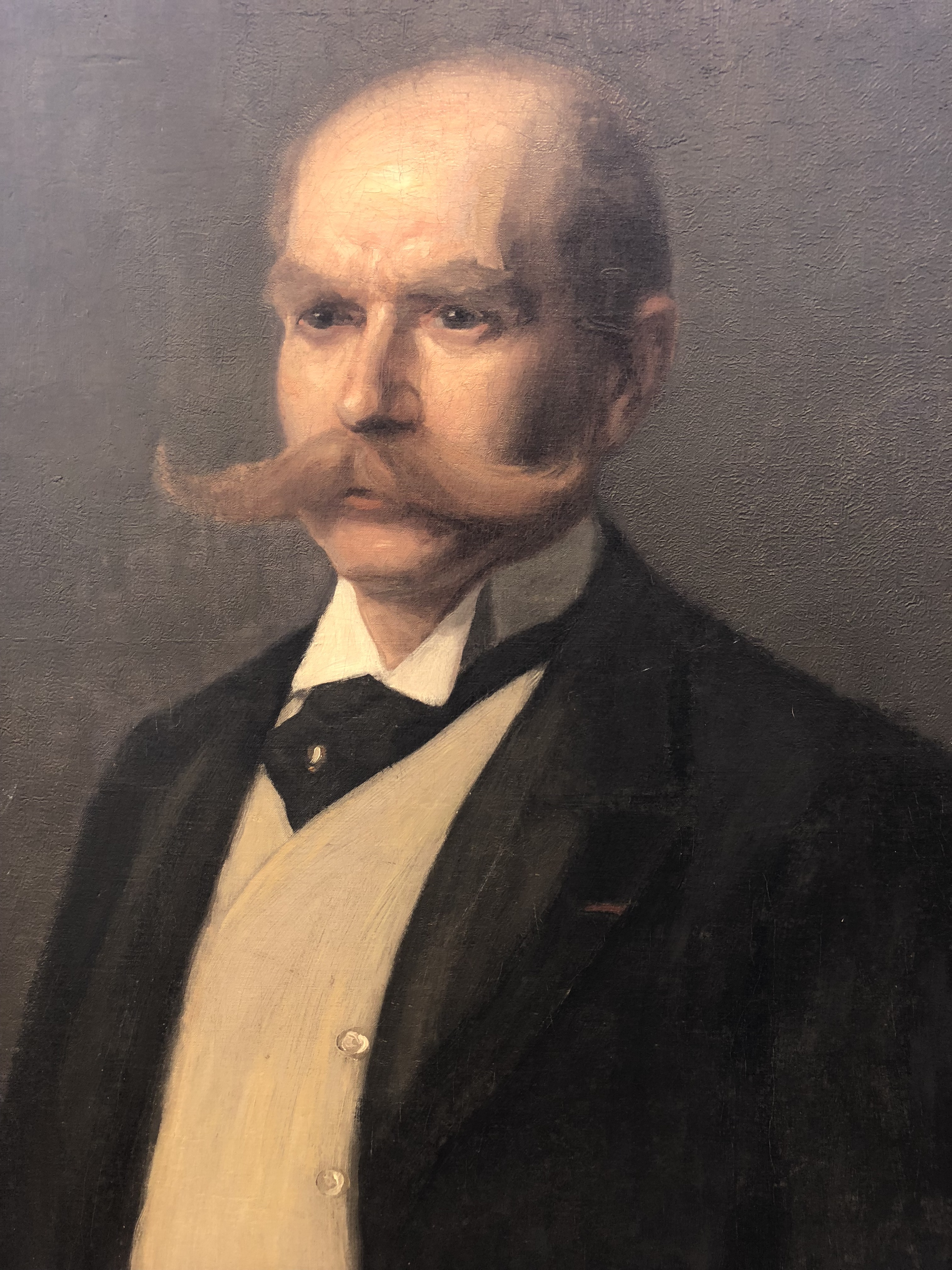
- Born: David Berlitzheimer; April 14, 1852; Mühringen, Kingdom of Württemberg, German Confederation
- Died: April 6, 1921 (aged 68); New York City, New York, US
- Resting place: Woodlawn Cemetery
- Other name: Maximilian Berlitzheimer
- Citizenship: American (from 1885)
- Occupations: Linguist; language teacher; writer
- Known for: Founder of Berlitz Language Schools
- Spouse: Lillie Bertha Ehler (m. 1872)
- Children: 2
- Relatives: Charles Berlitz (grandson)

Maximilian Delphinius Berlitz (né David Berlitzheimer; April 14, 1852 – April 6, 1921) was a German-American linguist, language teacher, and writer, known for founding the Berlitz Language Schools.

== Early life ==
Berlitz was born David Berlitzheimer (Note: Berlitz's birth name is alternatively cited as David Berlizheimer.) on April 14, 1852 in Mühringen, Kingdom of Württemberg (present-day Baden-Württemberg, Germany) to Leopold Berlitzheimer (né Löw Berlizheimer; 1799–1865), a religious teacher, hazzan and former cloth merchant, and Caroline Heilbronner (1814–fl. 1866). In the late 1850s, Berlitz's father was hired by a Jewish community in Markelsheim, Bad Mergentheim. One of three siblings, Berlitz's brother Isaac immigrated to America in 1865, and his sister Hanna in 1870.

From 1866 to 1868 (Note: Also cited as 1869.), Berlitz was an apprentice watchmaker in Bad Mergentheim. (Note: At this time Jewish boys in the Kingdom of Württemberg were required by law to either attend an academic institution or to train as an apprentice in an approved trade.) Unable to afford further education, Berlitz decided to immigrate to America. Traveling to Bremen, Berlitz boarded the SS New York and arrived in New York City on June 30, 1870. Berlitz settled in Westerly, Rhode Island where he worked as a machinist.

== Career ==
In 1875, Berlitz began working as a watchmaker. During this period Berlitz potentially gave private Greek and Latin lessons and taught at the local high school, and possibly worked as a language teacher at a theological seminary in Providence. The following year the family moved outside of Providence, and Berlitz began working as a language teacher at Bryant & Stratton Commercial College. The college was later take over William W. Warner, who renamed it Warner’s Polytechnic Business College, and Berlitz was appointed the head of the language department.

Later leaving the Warner’s Polytechnic Business College, Berlitz founded in Providence (Note: Also cited as France.) the Berlitz School of Languages in May 1878. The School initially used traditional methods of language instruction, before adopting the “Berlitz Method" (Note: Also cited as “The Direct Method" and “The Method”.) which forbid the use of instruction in English, that teachers must be a native of the country of the language they teach, and that languages be taught by pointing at objects and acting out verbs. Adapted from the "Natural Method" of language education invented by Lambert Sauveur and Gottlieb Henness, the “Berlitz Method" differed by introducing grammar and vocabulary from the first lesson, rejecting the use of translation as the basis of lessons and increased use of student participation.

Berlitz opened a second Berlitz Language School in Boston in 1880 (Note: Also cited as 1881.), and the family moved to Boston in 1882. The family later settled in New York City in 1886, where Berlitz opened a school in Brooklyn. The Berlitz Corporation headquarters were moved to New York the same year, and another school was open in Manhattan in 1887 before being moved to Broadway and 25th Street. By 1914, 339 Berlitz Language Schools operated in the United States, Europe, Latin America, and Africa.

Between 1880 and 1900 he also began writing about his ideas, developing them into a systematic method, which he then presented in 1900 at the World's Fair in Paris. As the twentieth century opened, he began travelling extensively, making headlines by teaching German Emperor Kaiser Wilhelm II to speak English. Berlitz's fame continued to spread as he received medals of honor from the King of Spain, the government of France, and from many international expositions.

== Personal life ==
Berlitz changed his first name to Maximilian in 1872, shortened his surname to Berlitiz by 1874 and adopted the middle name Delphinius in 1876. (Note: Initially alternatively spelt as “Burlets” or “Burlitz”.) In 1872, Berlitz married Lillie Bertha Ehlert (1854–1925), a German-American protestant. The couple had two daughters, both of whom were raised in the protestant faith. Berlitz was the grandfather of the linguist and writer Charles Berlitz.

In 1885, Berlitz became an American citizen in Boston. On April 6, 1921, Berlitz died from a heart attack in New York City. Berlitz is buried at Woodlawn Cemetery.
