= Berlitz Corporation =

Language education company

- Type: Subsidiary
- Industry: Language education, Leadership training, Language services, Franchising
- Founded: Providence, Rhode Island; July 1878; 148 years ago
- Founder: Maximilian Berlitz
- Headquarters: Princeton, New Jersey
- Number of locations: 500+
- Area served: 76 countries
- Key people: Till Groẞmaß (CEO), Daniel Rupp (CFO), René Schulz (CCO), Daniel Schlegel (CIO), Srikant Vemuri (CPTO)
- Products: Face-to-face language courses and cultural training; Online language courses and cultural training; Self-paced language courses; Testing and assessment
- Parent: ILSC Holdings LP
- Website: berlitz.com

Berlitz Corporation (founded in 1878) is an American education company that offers language courses in more than 50 languages, intercultural training, leadership, and soft-skills programs. Its teaching is based on the Berlitz Method, an immersion-based approach to language instruction in which lessons are delivered only in the target language, focusing on the immediate use in conversation. Recently, Berlitz has incorporated AI-enabled tools into its online platforms, including speech recognition, automated speaking practice, and conversational chatbots, to enhance learning.

The company is headquartered in Princeton, New Jersey, and operates internationally through a mix of franchised and company-owned centres. Berlitz later became part of Language Education Holdings, the parent company of ELS Educational Services and the ILSC Education Group. As of 2025, Berlitz operates in 76 countries, with approximately 375 learning centres worldwide, and also offers courses online.

== History ==
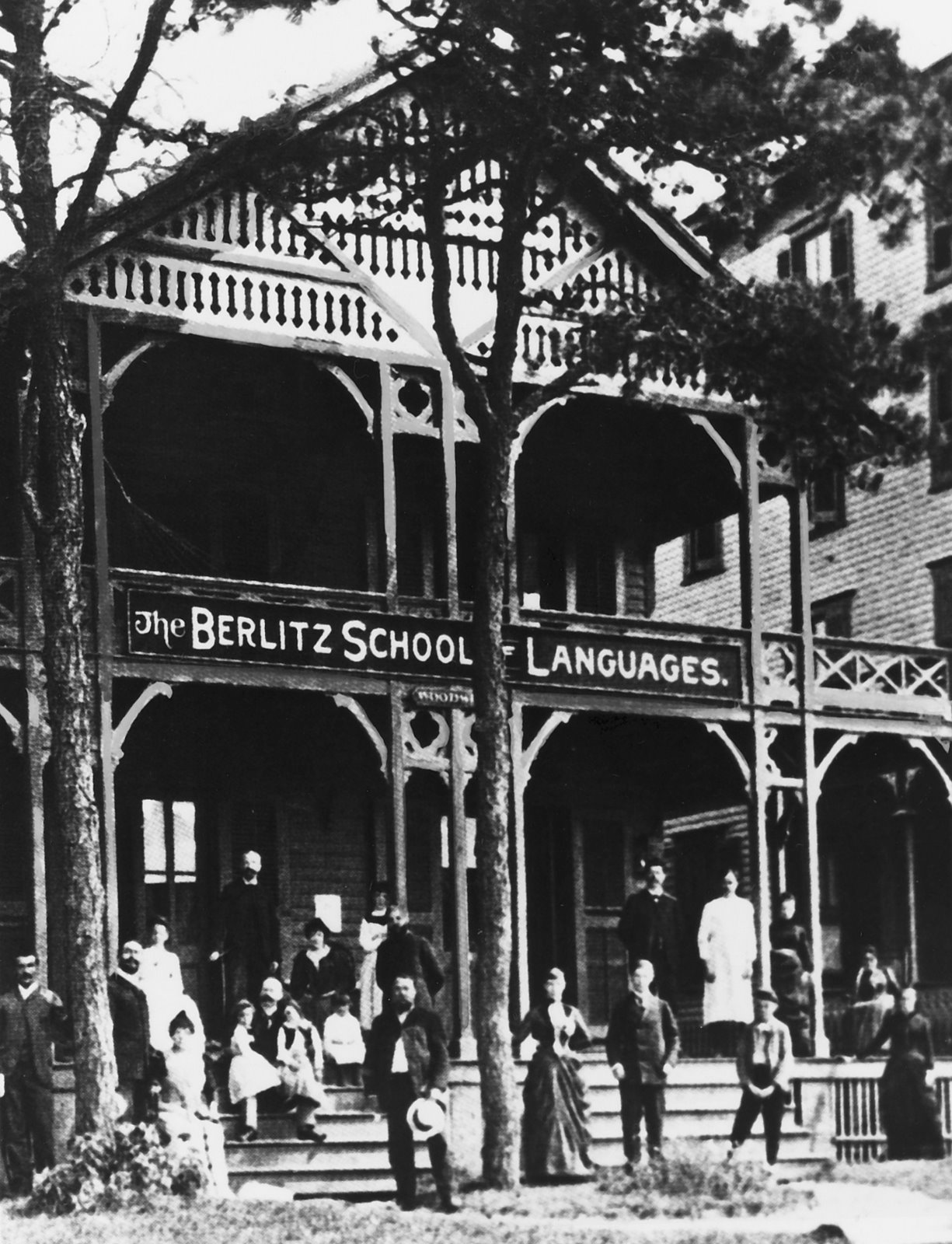
The first Berlitz Language School in Providence, Rhode Island (1878)

=== Founding and early years (1878–1880s) ===
Berlitz was founded in 1878 by Maximilian D. Berlitz, a German-American linguist born in Germany in 1852 to a family of educators and mathematicians. He emigrated to the United States in 1870 and began teaching languages in Rhode Island before joining Bryant and Stratton National Business College in Providence. In 1878 he established the first Berlitz School of Languages in Providence. During its early years Berlitz hired a young assistant from France who spoke no English. When the assistant was left in charge of a French class, instruction took place entirely in French, using demonstration, repetition and context to make meaning clear. To Berlitz’s surprise, students progressed more quickly than under traditional grammar-translation. The experience became the foundation of the company’s teaching philosophy.

=== International expansion (1880s–1960s) ===
The company expanded rapidly in the late 19th century, opening schools across the US and in major European cities such as Berlin, Paris and London. By the end of the century, it operated close to 100 schools worldwide.

During the First and Second World Wars, Berlitz faced challenges, including loss of male leadership due to military service. As a result, many of the schools were managed by women, who played a critical role in maintaining operations and ensuring lessons continued.

In the 20th century, new centres established in Latin America, including Mexico, Brazil, Venezuela, Argentina, Colombia, Chile and Peru.The first Asian school was opened in 1960 in Tokyo.

Berlitz grew internationally during the 1960s as international travel increased and English gained prominence as the global language of business. During this period, Charles Berlitz, the founder’s grandson, contributed to the company’s growth by authoring the Berlitz Travel Guides, which achieved commercial success and helped raise the company’s international profile.

=== Instructional developments (1960s–1980s) ===
In 1964, Berlitz introduced Total Immersion, an intensive language program that combined classroom instruction with practical, real-world activities aimed at developing fluency within a defined time frame. In 1982, the company launched Berlitz Kids, expanding its programs to include younger learners and families.

=== Ownership changes ===
Berlitz remained family-associated until the mid-20th century when it was acquired by Macmillan, American publishing company. In the 1990s ownership passed to the Japanese education group Benesse Corporation, which held the company for more than 20 years. In February 2022, Berlitz was purchased by ILSC Holdings LP, the parent company of the ILSC Education Group and ELS Educational Services. The transaction created Language Education Holdings, a combined organisation bringing together the three companies.

=== Technological adaptation (2000s–present) ===
Berlitz introduced online courses in the early 2000s. In 2017, it launched Berlitz Live Online, a format in which private and group lessons are delivered with a live instructor over video conferencing. In 2021, it introduced Berlitz Flex, a blended learning program combining self-paced digital study with live online coaching sessions with Berlitz instructors. In 2024, Berlitz introduced Berlitz On Demand Plus, learning program that combines self-paced, on-demand study with live group conversation classes led by Berlitz instructors via video call.

== Corporate structure ==
Berlitz Corporation is headquartered in Princeton, New Jersey. It is a wholly owned subsidiary of ILSC Holdings LP, which together with ELS Educational Services and the ILSC Education Group forms Language Education Holdings.

Berlitz operates through a network of regional subsidiaries and affiliates that administer language centres and training programs. These include country-level subsidiaries in Europe, Asia and the Americas, as well as specialised entities focused on corporate training and digital learning platforms.

As of 2025, the company is led by Till Großmaß, Chief Executive Officer, with Daniel Rupp serving as Chief Financial Officer and René Schulz as Chief Commercial Officer.

== Products and services ==
=== Language courses ===
Berlitz conducts classroom-based and online language courses for adults, children, and corporate clients. The curriculum includes general, business, and specialized communication training in over 50 languages, such as English, Spanish, French, German, Italian, Portuguese, Russian, Arabic, Mandarin Chinese, Japanese, Korean, and Dutch.

=== Corporate and government training ===
The company provides customized language and cultural training programs for corporate clients and government agencies. In some countries Berlitz is an accredited provider of publicly funded integration and vocational language courses.

=== Self-paced online learning ===
Berlitz offers online products for independent study. Berlitz Flex combines online self-paced modules with scheduled individual coaching sessions. Berlitz On Demand provides video-based lessons with interactive exercises, while Berlitz On Demand Plus supplements self-study with live group conversation classes.

=== Testing, certification and immersion programs ===
The company provides placement testing and language proficiency certification aligned with international frameworks. Berlitz also offers intensive immersion formats such as Berlitz Total Immersion consisting of classroom study with real-life practice sessions.

=== Leadership and soft-skills training ===
Berlitz offers training programs in leadership, management, cross-cultural communication and other soft skills.

=== Global presence ===
Berlitz operates in more than 70 countries across six continents. In Africa (Algeria, Egypt, Kenya, Morocco, and Tunisia), Asia (Armenia, Bahrain, China, India, Indonesia, Israel, Japan, Jordan, Oman, the Philippines, Saudi Arabia, Singapore, South Korea, Thailand, Turkey, the United Arab Emirates, and others), and Europe (Austria, Belgium, France, Germany, Italy, Spain, Switzerland, and the United Kingdom, and others). In the Americas, Berlitz has centres in Canada, the United States, Mexico, Brazil, Argentina, Chile, and several other Latin American countries. The company also operates in Australia.

== The Berlitz Method ==
The Berlitz Method is a language-teaching approach based on full immersion in the target language from the first lesson. It prioritizes speaking and listening over translation or formal grammar study. Each course follows a structured sequence of presenting new material, practicing with guidance, and applying it in conversation, with content linked to practical, real-life situations and learner objectives. The method originated in 1878 when Maximilian Berlitz placed a newly hired assistant from France in charge of a class. The assistant, Nicholas Joly, who spoke no English, conducted lessons entirely in French and relied on demonstration, repetition and context to convey meaning. Students advanced more quickly than expected, showing greater fluency than under grammar-translation. Berlitz recognized that immersion in the target language produced better outcomes and began formalising this approach into a structured method which became The Berlitz Method.

== Berlitz in pop culture ==
Berlitz co-produced Sesame English, an American television/video series with Sesame Workshop. Aimed at children from 4 to 7 years old, it was designed as a supplement to ESL (English as a Second Language) instruction.

== Recognition ==
In 2025, Berlitz ranked second in Newsweek’s “America’s Best Customer Service” list in the category of English language schools. In Japan, Oricon surveys regularly place Berlitz among the top English conversation schools in the country for customer service.

The company’s 2006 commercial “German Coastguard” received international recognition, earning a Silver Pencil at The One Show 2007 and a Wood Pencil at the D&AD Awards 2007. It was also included in The Drum’s list of the “World’s Best Ads Ever.”

== See also ==
- Language education
