= The Fortec Conspiracy =

1968 book

- Author: Richard M. Garvin and Edmond G. Addeo
- Genre: Science Fiction
- Published: April 1969
- Publisher: Signet
- Publication place: United States

The Fortec Conspiracy is a 1968 science-fiction novel by Richard M. Garvin and Edmond G. Addeo about alien materials and bodies being studied at Wright-Patterson Air Force Base.

== Inspiration ==
The Fortec Conspiracy explicitly quotes from the 1966 non-fiction book Incident at Exeter by John G. Fuller. In that book, Fuller writes: "There have been, I learned after I started this research, frequent and continual rumors (and they are only rumors) that in a morgue at Wright-Patterson Field, Dayton, Ohio, lie the bodies of a half-dozen or so small humanoid corpses, measuring not more than four-and-a-half feet in height, evidence of one of the few times an extraterrestrial spaceship has allowed itself either to fail or otherwise fall into the clutches of the semicivilized Earth People."

== Synopsis ==
The book revolves around the United States Air Force's Fortec program, short for Foreign Technology Division, charged with studying and reverse-engineering other nations' technical advancements. Barney Russom, the novel's hero, is told by military that his twin brother Bob, a Fortec researcher, has committed suicide. Skeptical of the story, Bob digs up his brother's casket, only to find the body of another man.

Barney discovers that an alien vehicle has crashed in Norway and that the bodies of its occupants are being stored at Fortec at Wright-Patterson. Barney breaks into Fortec and steals one of the aliens, escaping with it by car and plane. Barney, intent on telling the world the truth, is pursued on a cross-country chase. It turns out the alien harbors a deadly contagious virus.

The back cover of the book explains: "Scientist Barney Russom was determined to find out the truth behind his twin brother’s reputed 'suicide', for he knew the Air Force was lying about the death. But he had no way of knowing the enormity of the lie until he penetrated FORTEC security and saw with his own eyes what the Government was hiding: five tiny coffins — and sealed within them, an alien disease that threatened to destroy the world."

== Reception and influence ==
In 1974, science fiction author and UFO enthusiast Robert Spencer Carr began publicly claiming that alien bodies from a crash in Aztec, New Mexico were kept at "Hangar 18" at Wright-Patterson.

The Air Force publicly denied the claim and it was noted "that some elements of Carr's story were similar to... The Fortec Conspiracy". Carr's tale of "Hangar 18" was adapted into a 1980 film. Folklorist Toby Smith noted the works' influence on the Roswell incident myth, arguing "The Fortec Conspiracy did nearly as much to churn the Dayton-Roswell rumor mill as Hangar 18".
