= Hangar 18 (conspiracy theory) =

UFO conspiracy theory

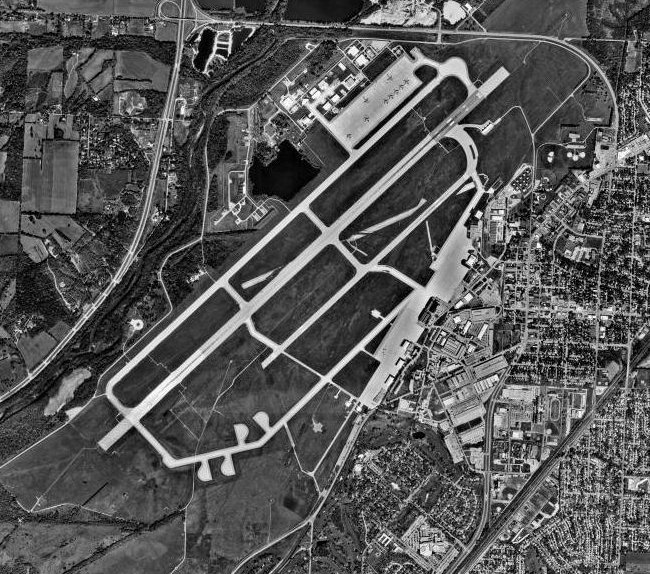
Aerial view of Wright-Patterson Air Force Base in Ohio, the alleged location of Hangar 18.

In UFO conspiracy theories, "Hangar 18" is the name given to a building that allegedly contained UFO debris or alien bodies. The name was popularized by conspiracy theorist Robert Spencer Carr in 1974, who claimed the hangar was located at Wright-Patterson Air Force Base near Dayton, Ohio; the United States Air Force (USAF) denies the existence of this hangar, stating that there has never been any extraterrestrial visitors or equipment at the base.

In 1980, a film titled Hangar 18 was released, loosely based on Carr's stories.

== Background ==
Wright-Patterson Air Force Base became a focal point of UFO folklore largely because of its real-world role in investigating aerial phenomena and foreign aerospace technology. Between 1947 and 1969, the base served as the headquarters for the Air Force's official UFO investigative programs—Project Sign, Project Grudge, and Project Blue Book—which collected and analyzed 12,618 reported sightings before concluding there was no evidence of extraterrestrial craft. Additionally, the base housed the Foreign Technology Division (FTD), which was responsible for analyzing captured or acquired foreign aircraft and aerospace technology.

Following the 1947 Roswell incident, an initial press release from Roswell Army Air Field stated that recovered debris had been sent to "higher headquarters." Although the Air Force subsequently identified the debris as a weather balloon (and later disclosed it was part of Project Mogul, a classified high-altitude surveillance balloon program), UFO enthusiasts speculated that wreckage and alien bodies had been secretly flown to Wright Field and stored in a heavily guarded vault sometimes referred to as the "Blue Room" or "Hangar 18."

== Earlier UFO conspiracy theories ==
In 1966, UFO conspiracy book Incident at Exeter featured a one-sentence mention of a crashed saucer tale about alien bodies in an Air Force morgue at Wright-Patterson Field. The passage served as the inspiration for the 1968 science-fiction novel The Fortec Conspiracy about a UFO cover up by the Air Force's Foreign Technology Division, the unit charged with studying and reverse-engineering other nations' technical advancements.

== Robert Spencer Carr ==
On October 11, 1974, science-fiction author and UFO conspiracy theorist Robert Spencer Carr conducted a live radio interview where he publicly claimed that alien bodies recovered from a 1948 flying saucer crash in Aztec, New Mexico, were being kept at "Hangar 18" at Wright-Patterson. The claim garnered substantial press attention, and led to official denials. The Air Force explained that there is no "Hangar 18" at the base—though a "Building 18" (the Power Plant Laboratory Complex in Area B) does exist, which reporters were invited to tour—and noted Carr's claims bore a close similarity to the science-fiction novel The Fortec Conspiracy. In a formal statement addressing the persistent rumors, the Air Force declared: "There are not now, nor have there ever been, any extraterrestrial visitors or equipment on Wright-Patterson Air Force Base."

During the interview, Carr also relayed a tale of Senator Barry Goldwater requesting and being denied access to a restricted area. Reached for comment, Goldwater admitted to having requested a tour and been denied, but Goldwater said he had never heard any rumors of alien bodies.

By September 1979, Carr's claims included a surgical nurse who witnessed an alien's autopsy.

Decades later, Carr's son recalled that his father had been a habitual liar who often "mortified my mother and me by spinning preposterous stories in front of strangers... [tales of] befriending a giant alligator in the Florida swamps, and sharing complex philosophical ideas with porpoises in the Gulf of Mexico. It wasn't the tall tales themselves that hurt so much but his ferocious insistence that they were true.... They were dead serious, and you had by God better pretend you believed them or face wrath or rejection."

By the late 1980s, Bob Lazar's claims about Nevada's "Area 51" were also circulating in conspiracy theories as a supposed repository for alien debris, ships or bodies obtained by the US government.

== Film adaptation ==
In November 1979, local papers reported that Roswell was being location-scouted for an upcoming film titled Hangar 18. That film, which dramatized Carr's claims, was released in 1980. It was later described by Thomas E. Bullard as "nascent Roswell mythology", while the film's director James L. Conway later described the film as "a modern day dramatization of the Roswell incident".

== In popular culture ==
The television series In Search of... filmed at Hangar "18A" at Wright-Patterson in 1980. The building's manager (who had been in that position since 1942) said that the freezing cells in the building were never used for the storage of alien bodies. He said the freezing cells were actually used to test airplane parts under cold conditions.

Megadeth's 1990 album Rust in Peace includes a song titled "Hangar 18".

The Star Trek: Deep Space Nine episode "Little Green Men" saw its protagonists, including Quark, inadvertently traveling back in time to 1947, where they are kept in Hangar 18.

The hip hop group Hangar 18, active from 2001 to 2009 took their name from the mythical hangar.

Animated sitcom The Simpsons features a sight gag reference to the mythical Hangar 18 in the ninth episode of the seventh season "Sideshow Bob's Last Gleaming", where soldiers open the gate and discover an alien with a glowing probe before closing the gate.

Hangar 18 is mentioned in the song "Skyfall" by Helloween on their self-titled album from 2021.

== See also ==
- Area 51
- Project Blue Book
- Roswell incident
- Wright-Patterson Air Force Base
