= Fermi 1 =

Breeder reactor at Enrico Fermi Nuclear Generating Station (1966–1975)

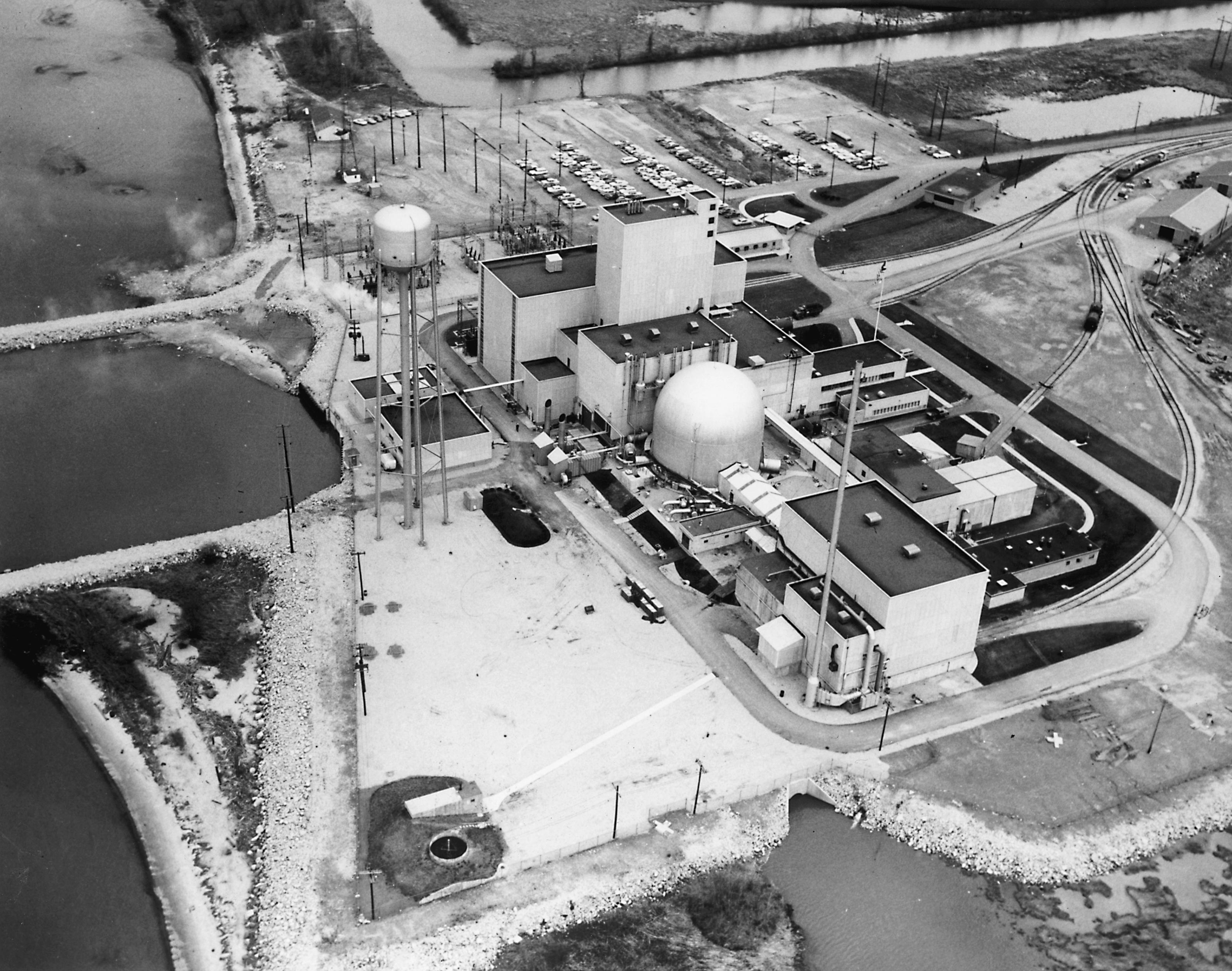
- Fermi 1 as it appeared in 1971
- Country: United States
- Coordinates: 41°57′38″N 83°15′28″W
- Status: Decommissioned
- Construction began: December 1956
- Commission date: August 6, 1966 (first net power)
- Decommission date: December 31, 1975
- Operator: Detroit Edison

Nuclear power station
- Reactor type: Fast breeder reactor
- Reactor supplier: PRDC

Power generation
- Units decommissioned: 1 x 150 MWe

Fermi 1 was the United States' only demonstration-scale breeder reactor, built during the 1950s at the Enrico Fermi Nuclear Generating Station on the western shore of Lake Erie south of Detroit, Michigan. It used the sodium-cooled fast reactor cycle, in which liquid sodium metal is used as the primary coolant instead of typical nuclear reactor designs cooled by water. Sodium cooling permits a more compact core, generating surplus neutrons used to produce more fission fuel by converting a surrounding "blanket" of ^{238}U into ^{239}Pu which can be fed back into a reactor. At full power, it would generate 430 MW of heat (MWt), or about 150 MW of electricity (MWe).

The design and construction of Fermi 1 was led by Walker Lee Cisler, president of Detroit Edison. Cisler believed that the breeder cycle would dominate the future commercial market because it would provide an effectively limitless supply of fuel, and he championed efforts to produce Fermi 1 based on the design of the small experimental EBR-I in Idaho. His efforts were supported by Lewis Strauss, chair of the U.S. Atomic Energy Commission (AEC), who was a strong advocate of private companies entering the nuclear field.

On November 29, 1955, EBR-I suffered a partial meltdown for reasons that were not completely understood. Construction licensing for Fermi 1 began in January 1956. The AEC review panel recommended that the design should not proceed until the problems with EBR, and breeder design in general were better understood through testing on newer experimental systems like EBR-II. When their report was cited in congressional hearings, Strauss refused to discuss it and approved construction. This led to a firestorm of debate within Congress and the press, along with a series of lawsuits by the United Auto Workers that briefly led to its construction license being revoked.

Construction was delayed by several years and the budget doubled. Operation had been planned for 1959 or early 1960 but Fermi 1 achieved criticality on August 23, 1963. While slowly increasing its power over the next two years, on October 5, 1966 it suffered a partial meltdown when the flow of sodium was disrupted by blockage of the inlet holes at the bottom of the reactor. The problem was detected early enough to safely scram the reactor and there was no radioactive release outside the containment building. The site was shut down for repairs and restarted in July 1970. It ran only until closing again on November 27, 1972, and was officially decommissioned on December 31, 1975.

== Background ==
Most commercial reactors run on fissile ^{235}U fuel. In nature, ^{235}U is mixed with a much larger amount of non-fissile ^{238}U. There is so much ^{238}U that the ^{235}U atoms are so sparse that a chain reaction is impossible. In most cases, this is overcome by two methods. One method is to "enrich" the fuel, concentrating the ^{235}U so the neutrons have a greater probability of hitting them. The enrichment leaves a by-product of non-fissile ^{238}U referred to as depleted uranium. The other method is to slow the neutrons, or "moderate" them, which increases the chance they will undergo a reaction.

The most common reactor designs use both of these methods, slightly enriching the fuel to about 3 to 5% ^{235}U and using water as a moderator. In these designs, ^{238}U is still the majority of the fuel. Some neutrons from the fission events hit these atoms and are captured, turning them into ^{239}Pu. These can also undergo fission like the ^{235}U. About 35% of the fission in a typical reactor is of the ^{239}Pu created in this fashion.

It is possible to increase the rate of capture and gain additional fuel. However, this process is much more efficient when the neutrons have higher energy, which works counter to the moderation needed for the ^{235}U. This leads to a class of designs that are optimized for the production of ^{239}Pu. These breeders are generally built in two parts, a "core" of fuel that is enriched to the point where it can maintain a chain reaction without a moderator, and a "blanket" of ^{238}U surrounding it that is designed to capture any spare neutrons and create ^{239}Pu.

^{235}U and ^{238}U are chemically identical, and are difficult to separate using mechanical processes based on their slightly different mass. In contrast, uranium and plutonium have different chemistry, and can be separated with chemical processes. This results in relatively pure plutonium that can be used for fuel in the core of the breeder with no further enrichment. Once the system is running, it is possible to produce enough plutonium to replace the original uranium fuel entirely, and still have more left over. This additional plutonium can then be used in the core of other breeders, or mixed with uranium and burned in conventional (non-breeder) reactors.

A reactor that can run unmoderated still needs cooling. Since water would give undesired moderation, some other form of coolant is needed. Sodium metal makes an excellent coolant with a very low chance of reacting with neutrons, thus improving the neutron economy. It also has excellent thermal transfer. The efficiency of heat transfer is a function of the difference between the maximum and minimum working temperatures. In sodium this is the melting point of 371 Kelvin (K) and boiling point of 1156 K. In contrast, water's equivalent limits at atmospheric pressure are 273 K and 373 K, which results in far less specific heat capacity. To improve this, many water-cooled reactors operate under high pressure in order to increase the boiling point. Sodium designs can run at atmospheric pressure at much higher temperature, offering a safety advantage. Offsetting this is the fact that sodium is highly reactive. Hot sodium will burst into flame on contact with water or oxygen.

== History ==
=== Breeder reactors ===
The breeder concept dominated early nuclear thinking as it offered a way to produce almost unlimited amounts of fuel from what was otherwise a waste product. In the 1950s it was commonly believed that the supply of natural uranium was limited and might run out if fission power became popular. The plutonium created could be used to fuel the breeder core, with enough left over to run other reactors. A breeder potentially generates not only electricity, but also income through fuel sales. The first power-producing reactor was a breeder, the Experimental Breeder Reactor I (EBR-I) at what became the Idaho National Laboratory. On December 20, 1951 it produced enough electrical energy to power a series of light bulbs.

=== Commercial development ===
Walker Lee Cisler was appointed to president of Detroit Edison in December 1951. He had just delivered a report to the United States Atomic Energy Commission (AEC) which suggested that nuclear energy would be practical for commercial power companies and could lead to an entirely new way of meeting future power needs. Cisler's report centered on the fast breeder, stating that "The breeder reactor would continuously produce amounts of fissionable material in excess of that consumed. Thus breeder reactors would augment rather than consume the world's supply of fissionable materials."

Cisler proposed a design cycle for a commercial breeder in a partnership between Detroit Edison and Dow Chemical. The AEC approved the concept on December 19, 1951. This was only one day before EBR-1 began initial operations. Over the next year, Cisler formed the Nuclear Power Development Department within Detroit Edison, and brought in fifteen other utility companies and suppliers, including Consolidated Edison and Philadelphia Electric. The combined group formed the Atomic Power Development Associates (APDA).

The AEC gave the organization the go-ahead for detailed design on October 19, 1952. Development proceeded slowly until President Eisenhower signed the Atomic Energy Act in August 1954, which allowed private companies to own nuclear plants. Further support for the project came when Lewis Strauss was appointed to chair the AEC. Strauss was very interested in seeing commercial development, and strongly supported both the breeder and light water reactor programs.

=== Negative review ===
At a review meeting with the AEC on November 10, 1954, Nobel Prize winner Hans Bethe and the designer of EBR Walter Zinn disagreed over the outcome of a meltdown in a breeder. Zinn suggested it might cause an explosion while Bethe felt this was extremely unlikely. Everyone agreed that such an explosion, were it to occur, would be small enough to be contained in a suitable building.

Shortly after the meeting, Alfred Amorosi was named the technical director of the project. He began an in-depth study of the operations and became concerned about one particular problem. One advantage of the sodium coolant was that it expanded when it got hotter, slowing the reaction speed and cooling the reactor back down. This negative temperature coefficient is highly desirable as it offers passive safety. However, EBR demonstrated a positive temperature coefficient under certain conditions. More disconcerting was that calculations of a second similar effect, the Doppler coefficient, appeared to be positive. In this case additional heat might lead to a runaway condition.

Amorosi's work was studied at a June 30, 1955 meeting of the breeder group within the Advisory Committee on Reactor Safeguards, a blue ribbon panel formed by the AEC, which is today part of the Nuclear Regulatory Commission. They were concerned that the Doppler coefficient might overwhelm the thermal effect and any automatic systems that were attempting to control it. The team was ambivalent about the concept on a broader sense, raising several potential serious issues and wondering why they were considering moving ahead with a full-scale plant without waiting for results from tests on smaller prototypes. They concluded that "It must be recognized that the assumptions on which these calculations are based have not been established experimentally, and must be so before the operation of such a reactor could possibly be recommended for a site close to a populated area."

=== EBR meltdown ===
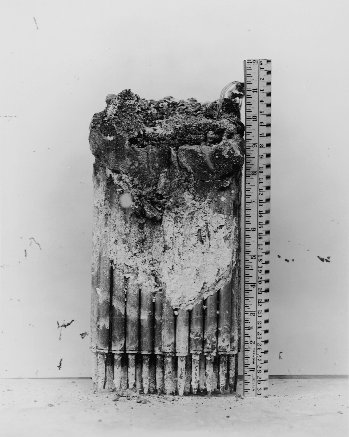
Part of the EBR core after the 1955 partial meltdown.

To further characterize these effects, in the summer of 1955, EBR began to run experiments to measure the Doppler coefficient. As the effect is more pronounced at higher temperatures, a test was arranged that would run the reactor at 900 °F (482 °C), not far below the melting point of the fuel. The reactivity was controlled by a series of motorized control rods that would be slowly extracted to allow the power to rise smoothly. In the case of a problem, a second set of emergency rods could be quickly dropped into the reactor.

The test was carried out on November 29, 1955. As the power was ramped up, at 500 W the temperature reading became confusing. Concerned that it was beginning to surge, the scientist in charge of the test ordered the operator to drop the emergency rods, but the operator pushed the button for the slower motor-controlled ones. The scientist realized what had happened and pushed the correct button, but in those few seconds, the power continued rapidly increasing. A second safety system was then triggered which dropped the entire blanket into a pit below the reactor, which had the effect of stopping the reactions.

About half of the core had melted in seconds, leaving the reactor so radioactive that it could not be approached. Teams were finally able to open the core weeks later and it was not immediately clear what had caused the problems. If it had been caused by Doppler effects, it suggested a larger plant would be completely uncontrollable. It was finally determined that the cause of the problems was that the fuel rods would bend, or droop, as they heated up, allowing them to move closer together and the reaction rate to increase. The issue of the Doppler coefficient remained untested.

The EBR meltdown brought to a head another lingering concern with the breeder design. As the core was highly enriched, even slight movements of the fuel could cause significant changes in reactivity, as occurred on EBR. If the blanket fell onto the fuel in the core it could "compact" it to prompt supercriticality, leading to an explosion. The same might occur if the fuel melted and collected at the rounded bottom of the reactor and then the rest of the core was pressed down onto it. Amorosi designed a simple solution to this later problem; a metal cone, not unlike an upside-down ice cream cone, was placed in the center of the sodium tank at the bottom of the reactor. During normal operation, this would help guide the flow of the sodium into the core. If the fuel melted, the cone would force it to flow outward into a ring shape which could not reach critical mass.

=== Application and McMullough review ===
Cisler applied for a construction permit for Fermi 1 in January 1956. A new company was formed to build the plant, the Power Reactor Development Company, or PRDC.

During a series of meetings with the AEC's Safeguards Committee in March, PRDC presented its work to date, but much of it remained preliminary. As to the topic of the Doppler coefficient, Argonne National Laboratory, who ran EBR-I, presented on data from the accident including the issue with fuel rod drooping. Wayne Jens of PRDC presented three major accident scenarios he had been studying, including the possibility that the sodium coolant might boil off which could result in an explosion with the force of 5 tons of TNT (21 GJ) TNT equivalent. The other two were meltdown scenarios, but the numbers for these were too preliminary. Henry Gomberg, of the University of Michigan, presented his work on potential radiation leak events, but again the results were tentative. Although the work was ongoing, Cisler stated his confidence that they would all be completed by the time they applied for an operational license some years in the future.

Another meeting and final review of the data was then arranged under the direction of Rogers McCullough of Monsanto on June 2, 1956 at the Chicago offices of Argonne. His review letter summarizing the meeting stated that "Even though there are no facts or calculations available to the Committee that clearly indicate the proposed reactor is not safe for this site, the Committee believes there is insufficient information available at this time to give assurance that the PRDC reactor can be operated at this site without a public hazard."

Of particular concern was understanding exactly what happened in EBR and "a clear demonstration must be given that a coefficient of this magnitude cannot exist in the PRDC design." This could only be solved by further experimentation, and the group felt that the currently planned tests would simply not provide enough information in time for the proposed opening in 1959 or 1960. They suggested building a smaller reactor specifically to test the effects of temperature swings, and another to test whether the proposed containment building concepts could actually stop an explosion of the magnitude being presented by Jens.

While additional information would be forthcoming from existing planned experiments, it would not be in time to influence the design before construction was completed, and existing experience on the smaller reactors "is not wholly reassuring." They recommended that the EBR-II program move ahead as rapidly as possible and be built as a true prototype of the Fermi design as opposed to a larger EBR that was purely experimental. While it lauded the PRDC for pursuing the design and developing it so rapidly, it concluded that "The Committee does not feel that the steps to be taken should be so bold as to risk the health and safety of the public."

=== Controversy in Congress ===
The McMullough review arrived at the AEC in the middle of a debate within the congressional Joint Committee on Atomic Energy about the Gore-Holifield bill that intended to provide more support for commercial nuclear power. Strauss felt that efforts like those of the PRDC represented the best path forward, while Democrats on the Joint Committee, led by Thomas E. Murray, who was also an AEC commissioner, favored additional federal funding for another round of experimental machines.

During debate on the bill, John Dingell raised the concern that the AEC was both in charge of promoting nuclear power as well as being in control of its safety. He pointed to the PRDC designs as an example and urged that funding be withheld "until all safety problems have been resolved for the protection of the public." He also sent press releases to the Detroit News, Toledo Blade and Wall Street Journal outlining the concerns about the design.

In late June 1956, the House Appropriations Committee began to review the AEC's request for additional funding for experimental machines. Chair Clarence Cannon used the meetings to vent his opposition to the rush to private-industry reactors and Strauss' leadership in general. Under his questioning, both Strauss and Murray revealed details of the controversy over the PRDC design. When Cannon complained that the private companies appeared to be making no progress, Strauss responded that he was going to attend the groundbreaking ceremony for Fermi on August 8th. This was first time construction had been mentioned, the date having been selected, along with the plant's name, before the McMullough review had taken place.

The next day, Cannon grilled Murray about the design, and Murray stated his belief that the breeder was an important part of the AEC's program, but that more funds should be provided for additional experiments. To underscore his argument, he read several portions of the McMullough review that suggested accelerating existing programs and building additional test systems. Cannon used this to argue that the entire originally asked-for $55 million be given to the AEC instead of the committee's $15 allocation. Murray then followed up the next day, meeting with Clinton Anderson, noting that Strauss appeared to be ignoring the McMullough concerns and had obviously decided to grant a construction license already.

After meeting with Murray, Anderson had James T. Ramey telephone the AEC and request a copy of the McMullough report. Harold Vance, Kenneth Fields, Melvin Price and AEC general counsel discussed the request. Vance was particularly concerned with the way this single report, among many within the AEC on the topic, had been introduced and thus appeared to Joint Committee as if it was the only such report. He went on to suggest that they clarify the role of the Safeguards Committee and the larger group of committees within the AEC. Price instead stated his opinion that "this is why documents like this ought to be privileged." They decided to ignore the request.

Anderson followed with a formal letter on July 9th, and after further internal debate, Strauss decided to declare it "administratively confidential" and responded on July 13th that they would release it only on the condition that it be treated as confidential information. The Joint Committee refused, stating they "could not receive the report under these conditions." On July 16th Anderson sent another demand to the AEC, which they once again refused, with Strauss stating simply there will be "no public answer".

=== Final approval ===
While this was all taking place, Price's Division of Civilian Application (DCA) was making its own review of the design. Their review letter touched on every point raised by the Safeguards Committee. For instance, in reply to the concern that there was not enough information available to allow operation at the proposed site, the DCA agreed, but then stated their opinion that such information would be forthcoming before the operational license would be considered. When considering the issue of meltdowns that might breach confinement, they once again agreed with the Safeguards Committee that there was not enough information available to draw a conclusion, but then stated simply that they felt that the suggested building would hold the "maximum credible accident in this reactor."

The AEC met on August 1st to consider the application. Price presented the DCA's case, stating that they agreed with the Safeguards Committee on what the concerns were, but that there were "differences of opinion with respect to this project that relate to the degree of optimism of pessimism among various people as to the likelihood that these problems can be satisfactorily resolved." He then suggested issuing a construction permit based on those issues being resolved before the operational license would be granted.

Strauss then called for discussion. Murray turned to McMullough, who was also present, and asked him if anything had occurred since June 6th to change his opinion. McMullough replied that nothing had changed. Murray then stated that he was opposed to issuing a construction license. Vance stated that they should go ahead with the construction license, but be sure to always use the term "conditional" when discussing it with the press, as he was concerned about the safety issues that were already known in public. He stated that "It may be some time before reasonable assurance can be obtained. If we were to delay the construction permit until then, it might delay a very important program. If we didn't think that the chances were very good that all these problems would be resolved, we would not issue the permit. We do think they are good."

In the end, three commissioners voted to issue the permit, with Murray voting no. The permit was issued on August 4, 1956.

=== Construction begins ===
The official groundbreaking took place on August 8th as Strauss had stated. This led almost immediately to a lawsuit by the United Auto Workers (UAW), led by Walter Reuther. The McCullough report was made public in August, after the construction permit had been released. Reuther noted the concerns about reassembly after meltdown, stating "In everyday language, this means the reactor might convert itself into a small-scale atomic bomb."

Cisler responded that the plant had only received a construction license, and that if safety concerns remained the operational license would not be granted. He then went on to claim the entire argument was politically motivated, telling the Detroit Free Press that "We are headed down the road to a socialist state" and that the people talking out against the design were "prepared to use any subterfuge to keep atomic power development in the hands of the government." He suggested the entire affair was simply a battle between those interested in keeping the designs in the public vs. private sector and that the arguments on safety were "hitting below the belt."

This led to a letter from Michigan senator Patrick V. McNamara to Cisler, stating "I reject the myth you have concocted that this is solely a fight between public and private power interests." He took the issue to the floor of the Senate, stating that safety was paramount because the site was just outside Monroe, Michigan, a city of 20,000, and it was only 30 miles (48 km) from Detroit. He noted "Were these questions raised solely by laymen - who known little or nothing about the complexities and technicalities of atomic reactors? No. They were raised by the AEC's own Advisory Committee on Reactor Safeguards. And its questions to date have never been answered."

Construction continued in spite of any ongoing concerns. This started with concrete being injected into the underlying bedrock in the summer, and excavations in October. The first concrete for the foundation, considered a key date in any reactor construction, was poured in December 1956. The top of the confinement dome was added on September 21, 1957. The reactor vessel itself arrived in May 1958, after a month-long barge and rail journey. By early 1958, cost estimates had risen to $70 million (equivalent to $802,000,000 in 2025), double the initial estimate. The final part of the reactor assembly arrived in May 1959, leaving only the steam plant to be completed. The AEC approved final construction on May 26th.

=== Completion and operational licensing ===
In August 1959, the first tests with the sodium cooling loops began. These were carried out in a gravel pit some distance away. On August 24th, the sodium exploded, injuring dozens and causing damage to nearby homes. Shortly thereafter, tests of the fuel pins demonstrated they would only work for 1/3 the originally predicted time before having to be removed. Further tests of the sodium cooling loops demonstrated the flowing metal would strip the fins off the pins that kept them separated from each other in the reactor. In 1960, a more serious problem with the pins arose that showed they could swell up inside the reactor and impede the flow of the sodium coolant. This required a several-month delay in construction to address.

By this time, the lingering threat of a lawsuit from the UAW had worked its way through the courts and was heard on March 23, 1960. The verdict was released on June 10th - the construction license was illegal and all work on the plant had to stop within 15 days. Cisler petitioned for a rehearing, but this was denied on July 25th. Both Detroit Edison and the US Department of Justice appealed to the US Supreme Court. Construction continued in the meantime.

On June 12th, the Supreme Court found in favor of Fermi 1. The majority opinion stated that the two-stage process of allowing construction and then operational licenses was valid "enough to satisfy the arguments of law." The minority opinion noted that allowing construction meant the companies involved would have invested millions in construction and by the time that is complete and that "The legislative history makes clear the time when the issue of safety must be resolved is before the Commission issues a construction permit."

The first of 105 fuel pins arrived on June 9, 1961 and the AEC issued an extended construction license to deal with the ongoing delays. Further issues impeded progress; the plug that sealed the top of the reactor had to be changed, and it was found that sodium was reacting with the graphite shielding inside the reactor. This caused another 15-month delay and added $2.5 million in construction costs. The AEC issued another construction license extension to cover it.

Through this period, Walter McCarthy headed up the operational license application. With construction largely complete in the fall of 1962 the Advisory Committee on Reactor Safety met again in October 1962 to consider the operational aspects. They cleared the reactor for fuel loading and operation at 1/400 of its nameplate power. Operation and review would be required before it could be brought to the next level of 200,000 kW of output, and finally to its design power of 400,000 kW thermal.

On December 11, 1962, Reuther filed a motion to delay the operational hearings while the UAW prepared its case. The next day, an overheating of the cooling water caused a string of events that dropped hot sodium out of the reactor, which immediately burst into flame. Reuther seized on the event as had the fuel been loaded it would have resulted in a serious radiation accident, which was picked up by the press, especially in Washington. The UAW case ultimately went nowhere, and the provisional operational license was approved.

=== Initial operations and meltdown ===
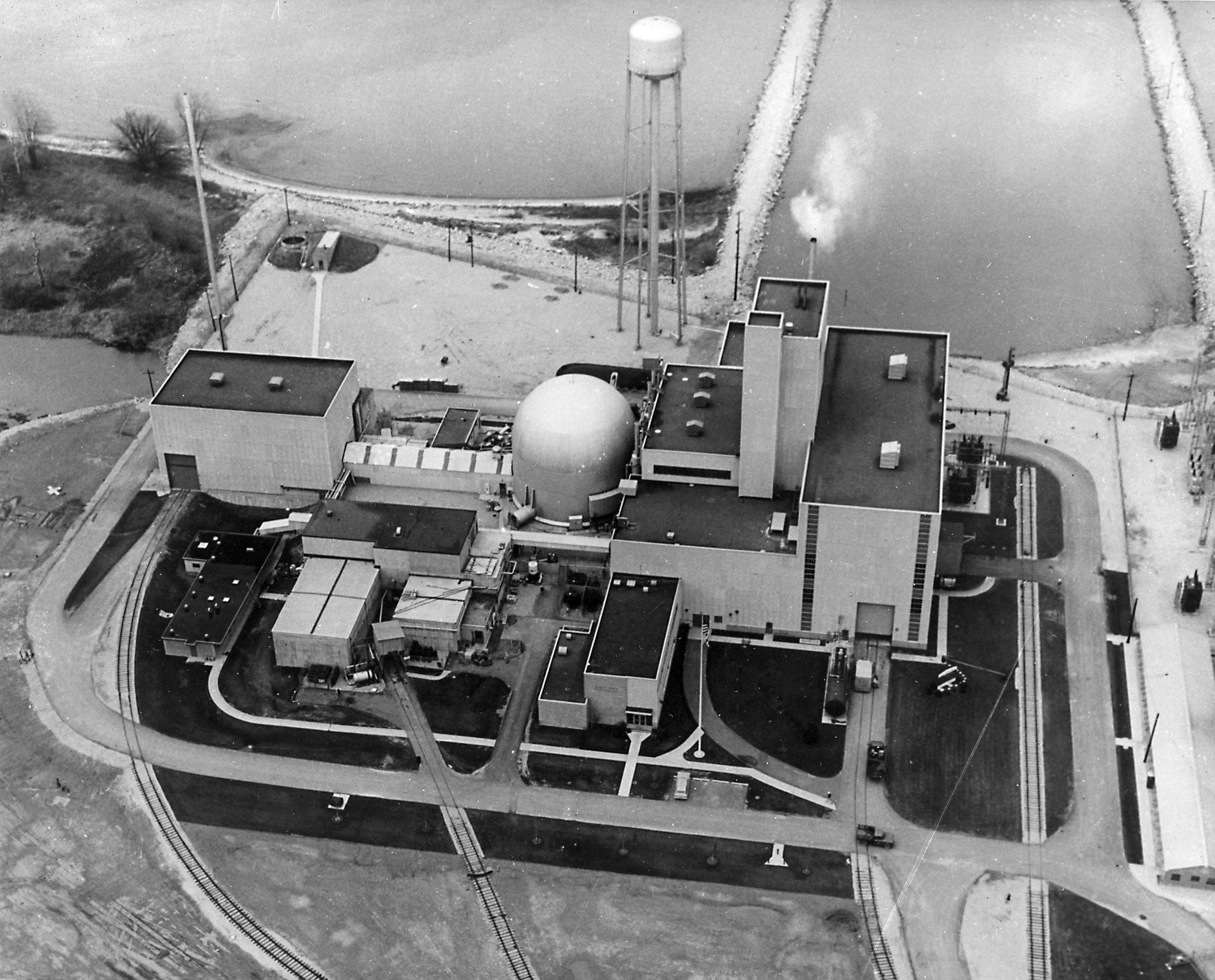
Overhead view of the plant shortly after it began operations in 1963. The cooling loops and turbogenerators are in the building on the right of the confinement dome, fuel processing on the left.

Final fuel loading began on July 12, 1963, and the initial chain reaction was successfully achieved at 12:35 PM on August 23, 1963. The reactor was operated at low power levels through the next year as many minor issues were found and worked out. By the end of 1965, plans were made to raise the power to 1,000 kW, then 20,000, and then 80,000, at which point some electricity would be delivered to the grid. By this time the cost of the project reached $100 million (equivalent to $1.146×10^{9} in 2025), and $120 million by October. The power ramp-ups continued successfully and the day of commercial export was set for August 6, 1966, with the reactor aiming to produce 33 MW of electricity during a run of 60 hours. During the extended run, several of the fuel assemblies showed anomalously high temperatures. There was no clear reason for this, but it was addressed by re-arranging some of the fuel assemblies in the core.

Another run-up to the same power level was cleared to start at 8 AM October 5th, but a very minor problems delayed it until 2:20 PM. At 3 PM the power reached 20,000 kW of heat, and erratic behaviour was noted that was addressed with a short period of manual control before returning to automatic. At 3:05, the operator, Mike Weber, noticed that the control rods appeared to be too far out of the core given the amount of heat being generated; normally they should have been about 6 inches (150 mm) out, but the automatic system had withdrawn them to 9 inches (230 mm). Additionally, the reactivity meters were displaying erratic values. This suggested the core had hot spots, but the display of the individual element temperatures was a distance from the main controls. As he scanned the display it was immediately clear that two assemblies were much hotter than the rest. At 3:09, the radiation alarms sounded and a Class I (minor) emergency was declared, sealing the reactor building. At 3:20, the decision was made to SCRAM the reactor.

McCarthy arrived shortly thereafter and began planning how to discover what had happened. Weber was concerned there had been local melting, which could cause issues even in a shut-down state. If the melted fuel collected it could continue heating the fuel around it to melting even with the control rods inserted. Although the monitors showed issues only in assemblies M-140 and M-098, only every fourth assembly had a meter, so it was possible there was more widespread melting. By the end of the afternoon the radioactivity was dropping and this possibility appeared remote.

=== Accident investigation ===
A month after the accident occurred some information was finally available by testing the flow rates of the sodium through the reactor, which suggested no more than six assemblies could have melted. Further testing involved slowly removing one control rod at a time to see what occurred, and this demonstrated that some melting had definitely happened. The problem then became how to identify the exact assemblies that were damaged, and how to remove them from the core. As there was no clear picture of how the fuel was arranged after melting, moving any of the assemblies might cause prompt criticality.

Over the next several months, fuel assemblies were removed one by one and shipped to a hot cell in Columbus, Ohio for examination. This revealed that four assemblies had melted, and two had stuck together. Most of the fuel had been removed by May 1967. At that point, the sodium began to be drained and by August enough had been removed to expose the bottom of the reactor vessel. The interior was examined with a periscope and discovered what looked like a crushed beer can at the bottom. New systems were used to get better images, revealing it to be a folded piece of sheet metal.

The problem became how to retrieve the object for study. Ultimately this required one of the sodium inlets to be cut open and a new device built that retrieved the metal. It was soon identified as a piece of zirconium shielding. To prevent melted fuel from burning through the bottom of the reactor, sheets of zirconium, which could withstand the temperatures of a meltdown, were spread across the bottom of the sodium tank. When the conical guide had been added, it was later noticed that it presented an unprotected area in the center of these plates. Amorosi added six triangular zirconium plates to the cone to prevent this escape route. The shields were added in 1959, late in the design process, and had not been added to the blueprints. Two of these plates had broken off and plugged the holes that allowed the sodium to flow around the fuel, causing the assemblies in those areas to overheat and melt.

=== Restart ===
A review demonstrated that the cone ultimately served no purpose, and the entire system had been removed by the end of 1968. The plant received permission to load fuel again in February 1970. In May, while under inspection by the AEC for startup, 200 pounds (91 kg) of sodium burst from a pipe, causing another pipe to break loose and spray the sodium with water, causing an explosion. Argon gas was used to douse the flames, but the building had to be closed for two days.

The system was finally ready for restart in July 1970. By October it had reached the original 200,000 kW heat level. By this time, the plant had cost $132 million. In January 1971 the one-year operational license was up for renewal and there were concerns it might be abandoned. To help, the AEC agreed to stop charging for the fuel, which was being prepared by AEC contractors. They renewed the operational license until June 1971, and then 1972.

The AEC was still interested in the continued development of the breeder concept, but Fermi 1 was now being seen as a white elephant. By this time the decision had been made to build an experimental breeder at Oak Ridge, which was being referred to as "the first demonstration breeder reactor in the United States.", completely ignoring Fermi. Ultimately, this reactor, at the Clinch River Nuclear Site, was abandoned in-place.

=== Shutdown ===
By 1972 the original fuel was reaching its burnup limit and would have to be replaced with fresh fuel. On August 27, 1972, the AEC issued a "Denial of Application for License Extension and Order Suspending Operations". In November, the PRDC accepted the decision and began shutting down the plant.

Shutting down the reactor involved the removal of all of the fuel and sodium coolant. The radioactive sodium was collected in 55-gallon drums with the intention to use that in the Clinch River reactor. Fike Chemical agreed to take the non-radioactive sodium at its plant in Nitro, West Virginia. They simply dumped it in old World War One bunkers that were partially open to the weather. Rain leaked into one of the bunkers, igniting the sodium and causing the town to shelter-in-place while it was put out. More sodium was found in similar conditions when the EPA learned Fike had abandoned the site, and it became a notorious superfund site.

Disposal of the rest of the low-level waste materials was put out for contract, but none of the four hazardous waste burial sites in the US would take it and the AEC began considering opening a new site of their own. The cancellation of Clinch River shortly thereafter presented another problem as there was no nowhere to ship the radioactive sodium, and it remained on-site until finally removed in 1984. The reactor vessel itself was removed and cut up in 2012.

The site is in SAFSTOR status as of 2021. The reactor, fuel and coolant has all been removed. The AEC had set aside $4 million for the cleanup. The ultimate shutdown costs ran to $130 million by 1974.

=== Controversy in the press ===
Shortly after the plant shut down, John Fuller released We Almost Lost Detroit, the title referring to a comment by an anonymous operator at the plant. Fuller, a novelist and playwright as well as reporter, had originally intended to write a fictional account of a meltdown but then came across AEC documents on Fermi 1 and decided reality was more interesting than fiction.

By any metric, the accident was a minor one. The meltdown was limited and the various worst-case scenarios were nowhere close to occurring. Fuller's book portrays a very different picture: that the design was inherently unsafe and the fact that it did not explode and "lose Detroit" was largely a matter of luck. This conclusion was heavily debated at the time, and the subject of a book by Detroit Edison, the operators of the plant, that stated that such a disaster was not in the making entitled "We did not almost lose Detroit."

Other authors have criticized Fuller's work on the basis of its list of previous accidents to build a picture of an industry balanced on the edge of disaster. The NRU meltdown is mentioned prominently, but is only peripherally related to Fermi, and the Windscale fire is also covered in-depth, but is not the same configuration of reactor. Meanwhile, the Sodium Reactor Experiment, which suffered a partial meltdown in 1959 for almost exactly the same reasons as Fermi, is not mentioned at all.

Fermi 1 remains a touchstone for anti-nuclear activists, who marked the 50th anniversary of the event in 2016 by characterizing it as "the narrow aversion of a cataclysmic disaster."

== Description ==
Fermi 1 was a loop-type reactor, in which the core is held within a test tube-shaped vessel that contains the sodium coolant. The core is suspended in the middle of the reactor and the coolant is pumped through it at low pressure. The coolant is then sent to a heat exchanger which moves the energy into a second loop containing water. This hot water is then sent to another heat exchanger, the steam generator, and the resulting steam powers a conventional steam turbine. This series of cooling loops is intended to isolate the sodium coolant and any radioactivity it contains as close to the reactor as possible, making maintenance on the rest of the plant simpler.

In overall design terms, the loop-type reactor is similar to a light water reactor with an additional loop for the sodium. In light water designs, the coolant running through the core normally drives the steam generators directly. This contrasts with the pool-type design which is also used for sodium-cooled reactors. The pool design consists of two bowl-like chambers, one inside the other. The sodium is pumped between the two spaces to remove heat from the core, and water coolant loops remove heat from the space between the two bowls. The two designs have their advantages and disadvantages, with the loop designs generally being somewhat smaller and thus less expensive, while the pool designs better isolate the sodium from the environment, and their large sodium mass is an effective guard against thermal transients.

The Fermi design had three primary coolant loops, each entering the reactor above the core at 120 degree separations. The sodium then flowed down around the core into a tank area at the bottom of the reactor. On top of the tank area was a plate with many holes drilled in it. The sodium flowed up from the tank through the holes in the plate which spread the flow over the volume of the core and the surrounding radial blanket. The outlets were located just above the core area. At the top of the reactor was a large plug that could be rotated to provide access to the top of the core and blanket, allowing fuel to be added or removed.

Fuel was produced in long rods which were then bundled together into larger assemblies. The fuel was enriched to 25.6% 235, compared to perhaps 3 to 5% in a typical light water reactor. Criticality required about 1734 kg of fuel, and could be achieved with as few as 91 and as many as 111 assemblies, typically using around 96. The reactor core was offset within the reactor chamber, with a drum sitting on one side. This drum was connected by a tube leading upward to the top of the reactor area, allowing fuel to be inserted or removed from the reactor without opening it. A large claw-like arm above the core was used to move the assemblies between the core and the drum, and an elevator-like system to move it between the drum and a heavily shielded cell on railway tracks outside the core.

== In popular culture ==
We Almost Lost Detroit, a 1975 Reader's Digest book by John G. Fuller, presents a history of Fermi 1, with emphasis on the 1966 partial nuclear meltdown.

Rap pioneer Gil Scott-Heron has a song also titled "We Almost Lost Detroit", dealing with the same issue. The song appeared on his 1977 album, Bridges. The song is covered by various including Dale Earnhardt Jr. Jr. on their album It's a Corporate World.

== See also ==
- Superphénix - a larger breeder design built in France
