= Aztec crashed saucer hoax =

Alleged event at Aztec, New Mexico

The Aztec crashed saucer hoax (sometimes known as the "other Roswell") was the allegation that a flying saucer crashed in 1948 in Aztec, New Mexico. The story was first published in 1949 by journalist Frank Scully in his Variety magazine columns, and later in his 1950 book Behind the Flying Saucers. In 1952, the story was exposed as a hoax fabricated by two con men, Silas M. Newton and Leo A. Gebauer, as part of a fraudulent scheme to sell materials claimed to incorporate extraterrestrial technology; they were convicted of fraud for this enterprise in 1953.

Beginning in the 1970s, some ufologists resurrected the story in books claiming the purported crash was real. Aspects of the Aztec hoax, such as the recovery of alien bodies and a saucer-shaped craft incorporating seemingly indestructible metal, have become intertwined with narratives about the better-known Roswell incident. In 2013, the FBI released a large number of documents online, drawing attention to a 1950 memo by FBI agent Guy Hottel claimed by some ufologists to substantiate the Aztec crash; the events described in the memo were dismissed by the bureau as "a second- or third-hand claim that we never investigated".

== Story ==
In 1949, author Frank Scully published a series of columns in Variety magazine retelling the crash story told to him by two men identified as Silas Newton and Leo A. Gebauer. He later expanded these columns to create Behind the Flying Saucers in 1950, a best-selling book that influenced public perceptions about UFOs. According to Scully, in March 1948, an unidentified aerial craft containing sixteen humanoid bodies was recovered by the military in New Mexico after making a controlled landing in Hart Canyon 12 mi (19 km) northeast of the city of Aztec. The craft was said to be 99 feet (30 m) in diameter, the largest UFO to date. According to his sources, the incident had been covered up and "the military had taken the craft for secret research". Scully also claimed a similar craft was found in the Sahara Desert, but this is omitted in his later writings.

Scully wrote that the crashed UFO, along with other flying saucers captured by the government, had come from Venus and worked on "magnetic principles". According to Scully, the inhabitants stocked concentrated food wafers and "heavy water" for drinking purposes, and every dimension of the craft was "divisible by nine". Science writer Martin Gardner criticized Scully's story as full of "wild imaginings" and "scientific howlers".

American UFO writer Jerome Clark and the International Business Times note that no contemporary press accounts of the crash or recovery effort have been found. Clark wrote that "Aztec residents have with virtually one voice, denied that anything like a UFO retrieval happened there... on any date", and that they only found out about the story as a result of the publicity garnered by Scully. Those who have denied the events include the local newspaper editor and the county sheriff in March 1948, the sheriff's son (who succeeded his father as sheriff), and the family who owned the property where the events are said to have taken place. Clark further notes that the pioneering ufologist Donald Keyhoe, who was known for backing UFO claims, regarded Scully's narrative "as absurd and fanciful."

== Hoax ==
External audio
- Lecture by Silas Newton on March 8, 1950 at the University of Denver: Part 1 and Part 2

During the late 1940s and early 1950s, Newton and Gebauer traveled through Aztec, attempting to sell devices known in the oil business as doodlebugs. They claimed that these devices could find oil, gas and gold, and that they could do so because they were based on "alien technology" recovered from the supposed crash of a flying saucer. When J. P. Cahn of the San Francisco Chronicle asked the con men for a piece of metal from the supposed alien devices, they provided him with a sample that turned out to be ordinary aluminum. In 1952, Cahn exposed the hoax in True magazine. A follow-up article in 1956 presented other victims who had been swindled by Newton and Gebauer. One of the victims was millionaire Herman Flader, who pressed charges. The two men were convicted of fraud in 1953.

Newton subsequently returned to swindling energy investors; when he died in 1972, he had 40 legal claims against him stemming from allegedly fraudulent oil and gas schemes, and he was facing theft charges.

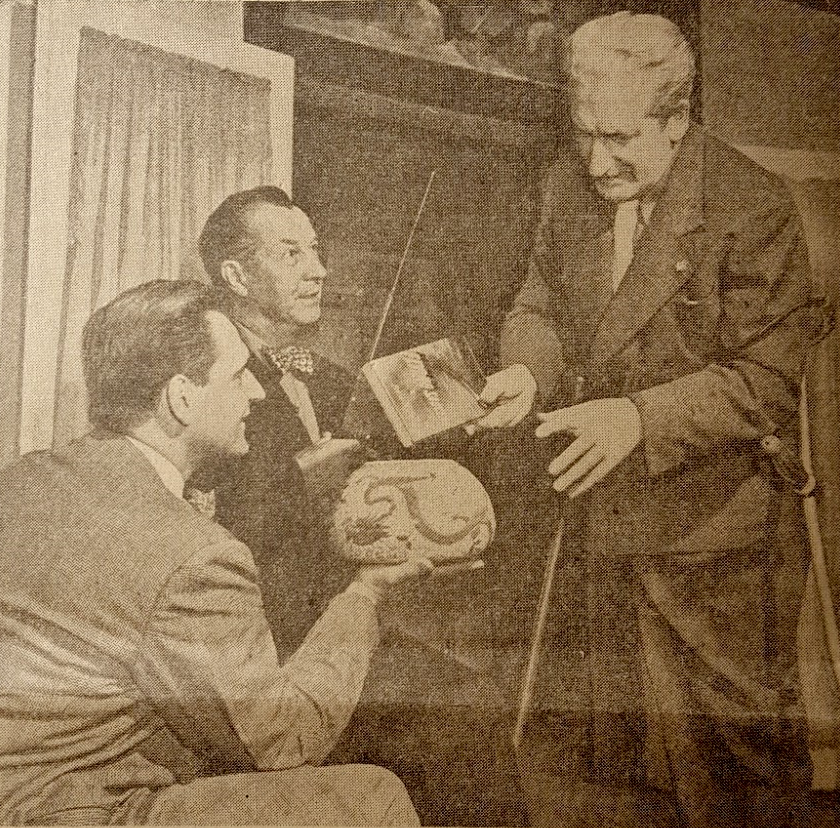
Author Frank Scully (right) and confidence man Silas Newton (center)

== Influence on ufology ==
Through the mid-1950s to the early 1970s, most ufologists considered the Aztec crash thoroughly discredited and therefore avoided the topic. In 1966, the book Incident at Exeter mentioned rumors of dead alien bodies stored at Wright-Patterson Air Force Base, which inspired the 1968 science fiction novel The Fortec Conspiracy. In 1974, ufologist Robert Spencer Carr publicly claimed alien bodies recovered near Aztec were stored at a building at Wright-Patterson called Hangar 18, prompting official denials from the Air Force. The Air Force explained that there is no Hangar 18 at the base and noted Carr's claims mirrored the plot of the novel.

In the late 1970s, author Leonard Stringfield said that not only was the incident real, but that the craft involved was one of many captured and stored by the U.S. military. In later years, many allegedly first-hand accounts of the Roswell crash contained elements of the Aztec crash story, with some claiming the craft was made of a material impervious to all heat, and others alleging the craft was damaged by the crash. The supposed humanoid bodies were said to measure between 36 inches (91 cm) and 42 inches (110 cm) in height, and weigh around 40 pounds (18 kg). Ufologists claim that shortly after the craft was downed, the military cleared the area of evidence including the bodies, and subsequently took recovered materials to Hangar 18 at Wright-Patterson.

The 2012 book The Aztec UFO Incident by Scott and Suzanne Ramsey and Frank Thayer alleges that the crash was legitimate, and that the Newton and Gebauer trial was "engineered... to sink Aztec" by discrediting the two men. Clark criticizes Scott Ramsey, the primary author, for baselessly asserting that Newton was a "man of science" and for ignoring evidence that fails to back his hypothesis.

== FBI memo ==
In April 2011, the FBI launched The Vault, an online repository of public records released under the Freedom of Information Act. After the Vault launched, a one-page March 22, 1950 memorandum by Guy Hottel (special agent in charge of the FBI's Washington Field Office) drew renewed attention online, and the FBI later described it as the Vault's most-viewed document.

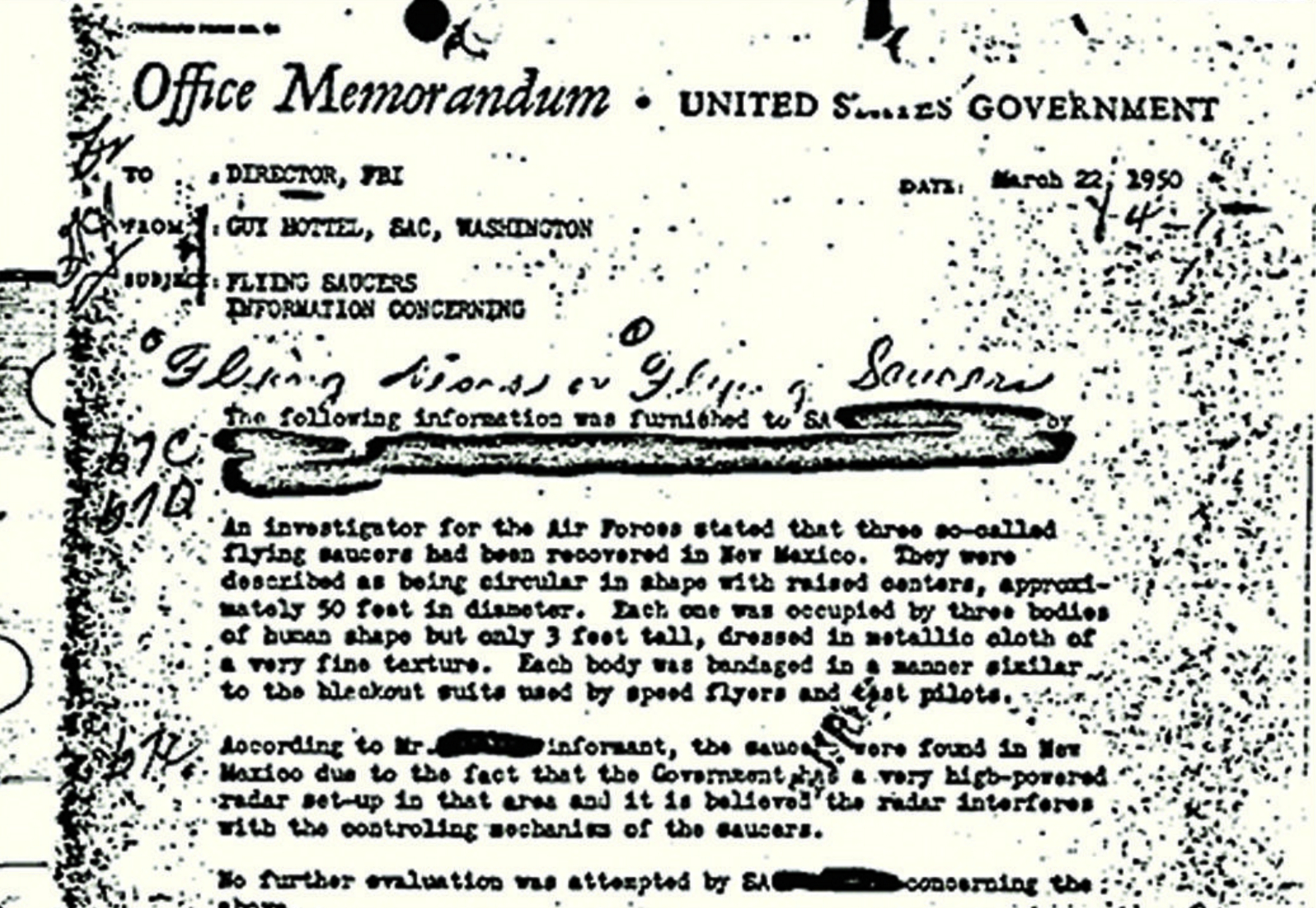
"Hottel Memo" as initially published, with the name of the informant redacted

The Hottel memo relays a third-party account claiming that an Air Force investigator had reported three circular craft recovered in New Mexico. The memo describes the objects as "approximately 50 feet in diameter" and states that each contained three small humanoid bodies "only three feet tall," wearing "metallic cloth." It attributes the alleged recovery to interference from a "high-powered radar" installation in the area, and ends by noting that "No further evaluation was attempted."

The memo was initially published on The Vault with the name of the informant redacted, leading to speculation about their identity and the underlying source of the information. The Ramseys and Thayer, the co-authors of The Aztec UFO Incident, and David E. Thomas, a researcher with the group New Mexicans for Science and Reason, tied the memo to the Aztec crash because the narrative more closely resembles Newton's claims than it resembles contemporary accounts of the Roswell incident. Another theory is that the informant read the narrative in a story printed in January 1950 by The Wyandotte Echo, which was traced thirdhand to Newton. According to Scott Ramsey, a common critique of these theories is that the memo is ambiguous about the crash location, never specifically mentioning Aztec.

In 2013, the FBI stated that the memo "does not prove the existence of UFOs" and characterized it as an unconfirmed "second- or third-hand claim" the Bureau did not investigate. The FBI also stated that the memo had been released publicly decades earlier and had been posted online prior to the 2011 Vault launch. Benjamin Radford with The Christian Science Monitor noted that the memo was unclassified, suggesting that the FBI did not feel that the alleged crash merited secrecy, and that copies had been circulating among ufologists since the late 1990s.

In August 2022, The Black Vault obtained an unredacted copy of the memo from the FBI, which revealed that the informant was "KARL HOWE, Special Investigator, Sex Squad, Metropolitan Police Department"—presumably a reference to the Metropolitan Police Department of the District of Columbia, although the memo never makes this clear. Neither the unredacted memo nor supporting documents obtained by The Black Vault reveal where Howe obtained the information, so the source remains an enigma and the narrative cannot be conclusively tied to Newton.

== Fundraiser ==
The incident inspired the founding of the Aztec UFO Symposium. This was run as an annual fundraiser by the Aztec, New Mexico, library from 1997 until 2011.

== See also ==
- Twin Falls Saucer Hoax
- The Bamboo Saucer, a 1968 film about a crashed saucer with dead bodies being recovered by Soviet and American forces from Red China
- Hangar 18 (conspiracy theory)
- Hangar 18, a 1980 film about a crashed craft with dead bodies
- List of reported UFO sightings
