= Bridges (Gil Scott-Heron and Brian Jackson album) =

Studio album by Gil Scott-Heron & Brian Jackson
- Released: September 1977
- Recorded: 1977
- Genres: Soul, jazz-funk, funk, jazz, spoken word
- Length: 39:13
- Label: Arista
- Producers: Gil Scott-Heron; Brian Jackson; Larry Fallon; Tom Wilson

Gil Scott-Heron & Brian Jackson chronology
It's Your World (1976)	Bridges (1977)	Secrets (1978)

Professional ratings
Review scores
Source	Rating
AllMusic	4/5 stars
Christgau's Record Guide	B
The Rolling Stone Album Guide	3/5 stars

Bridges is an album by Gil Scott-Heron and Brian Jackson, released in the fall of 1977 on Arista Records.

== "We Almost Lost Detroit" ==
The song "We Almost Lost Detroit", which shares its title with the 1975 John G. Fuller book of the same name, recounts the story of the nuclear meltdown of Fermi 1 at the Enrico Fermi Nuclear Generating Station in Frenchtown Township near Monroe, Michigan, in 1966. It was performed at the No Nukes concert in September 1979 at Madison Square Garden. This song was also contributed to the No Nukes album in November 1979 and No Nukes concert film in May 1980.

== Track listing ==
All tracks are written by Gil Scott-Heron except as noted.

No.	Title	Writer(s)	Length
1.	"Hello Sunday! Hello Road!"		3:37
2.	"Song of the Wind"		3:53
3.	"Racetrack in France"	Scott-Heron, Brian Jackson	4:15
4.	"Vildgolia (Deaf, Dumb & Blind)"	Scott-Heron, Jackson	7:31
5.	"Under the Hammer"		3:59
6.	"We Almost Lost Detroit"		5:19
7.	"Tuskeegee #626"		0:33
8.	"Delta Man (Where I'm Coming From)"		5:45
9.	"95 South (All of the Places We've Been)"		4:51

== Personnel ==
- Gil Scott-Heron - Lead Vocals, Guitar, Piano
- Brian Jackson - Flute, Keyboards, T.O.N.T.O.
- Danny Bowens - Bass
- Josef Blocker, Reggie Brisbane - Drums
- Fred Payne, Marlo Henderson - Guitar
- Tony Duncanson, Barnett Williams - Percussion
- Bilal Sunni Ali - Saxophone
- Delbert Taylor - Trumpet

== Charts ==
Year	Album	Chart positions		
Year	Album	US	US R&B	Jazz Albums
1977	Bridges	130	—	16

== Legacy ==
- The song "We Almost Lost Detroit" is sampled by:
  - "Brown Skin Lady" by Black Star on Mos Def & Talib Kweli Are Black Star
  - "The People" by Common on Finding Forever
- The song "We Almost Lost Detroit" is covered by Dale Earnhardt Jr. Jr. on their album It's a Corporate World (2011).
