= Beyond Infinity (short story collection) =

- Dust-jacket from the first edition
- Author: Robert Spencer Carr
- Cover artist: Hannes Bok
- Language: English
- Genre: Science fiction short stories
- Publisher: Fantasy Press
- Publication date: 1951
- Publication place: United States
- Media type: Print (hardback)
- Pages: 236 pp
- OCLC: 1143444

Beyond Infinity is a collection of science fiction stories by author Robert Spencer Carr. It was first published in 1951 by Fantasy Press in an edition of 2,779 copies. Two of the stories originally appeared in The Saturday Evening Post, while the title story and "Mutation" saw first publication in the book.

== Contents ==
- "Morning Star"
- "Mutation"
- "Those Men from Mars"
- "Beyond Infinity"

== Reception ==
The New York Times reviewer Villiers Gerson found the title story "overprecious," but praised the others for the author's "humor, his absorption with human values, and his writing skill." P. Schuyler Miller recommended the collection as a "wedding of good, tried science-fiction themes, worked out deftly, with real fictional know-how."
