= We Almost Lost Detroit =

Book by John G. Fuller

- First edition
- Author: John G. Fuller
- Subject: Nuclear power plants
- Publisher: Reader's Digest Press
- Publication date: 1975
- ISBN: 0883490706
- Dewey Decimal: 621.483
- LC Class: TK1344.M5

We Almost Lost Detroit, a 1975 Reader's Digest book by John G. Fuller, presents a history of Fermi 1, America's first commercial breeder reactor, with emphasis on the 1966 partial nuclear meltdown.

It took four years for the reactor to be repaired, and then performance was poor. In 1972, the reactor core was dismantled and the reactor was decommissioned. America's first effort at operating a full-scale breeder had failed.

== Reception ==
Bulletin of the Atomic Scientists felt it was "a significant book and it is well worth reading." They felt it explained how the accident happened but not why. Kirkus Reviews called it "the heaviest broadside against the Atomic Energy Commission in years".

== Legacy ==
Spoken word and rap pioneer Gil Scott-Heron has a song titled "We Almost Lost Detroit", dealing with the same issue. The song appeared on his 1977 album, Bridges. The song is covered by Dale Earnhardt Jr. Jr. on their album It's a Corporate World.

This song was also covered by Ron Holloway on his album, Groove Update, which features Gil Scott-Heron on vocals.

Scott-Heron’s song, in turn, provides the reference to the 2020 documentary We Almost Lost Bochum about the hip hop group RAG from Bochum in western Germany.

== See also ==
- List of books about nuclear issues
- Nuclear and radiation accidents
