= Fike Chemical =

Former chemical company in the US

Coordinates: 38°25′36″N 81°50′50″W

Fike Chemical is a former heavy chemical company and notorious superfund site in Nitro, West Virginia. Founded by Elmer Fike in 1971 in the buildings of a World War One government nitrocellulose plant, the 11-acre factory specialized in taking on jobs that larger chemical companies would ignore. To make this profitable, the company did no waste remediation, dumping hazardous chemicals into unmarked 55-gallon drums and open-pit lagoons on the site, next to the Kanawha River.

The site was subject to continual problems. In one infamous example, the company had agreed to dispose of the sodium coolant from the closed Fermi 1 nuclear reactor, which they did by dumping it in a WWI-era bunker. Rain began to leak in, causing the sodium to explode and requiring the town to shelter in their homes while the fire was put out over a 12 hour period. This was only one of several newsworthy incidents which eventually attracted the attention of 60 Minutes where Lesley Stahl introduced the segment stating "Now we take you to the messiest place we've ever been".

The 60 Minutes segment attracted the attention of the Environmental Protection Agency (EPA). They admitted the site "fell through the cracks". By 1982 they had reached an agreement with Fike on soil and water testing and remediation of the site. In 1983, the EPA was told by the mayor that Fike had laid everyone off and abandoned the site. Throughout, Fike complained about government oversight and claimed it was their fault he went out of business.

Fike sold the site to Artel Chemical in 1986, but they closed the plant in 1988. In June 1988 the EPA sent in teams to clean it up, finding an unsecured cylinder of hydrogen cyanide, remaining sodium metal, a huge tank of flammable methyl mercaptan, 10,000 unlabeled barrels with volatile organic compounds and other dangerous chemicals, and high dioxin levels in the ground. After cleanup, in May 1999 the EPA transferred the property to the Nitro Development Authority. All major cleanup was considered complete in 2011, which showed no residual leakage into the river. Monitoring of the aquifer continues.
