= Nitro, West Virginia =

City in West Virginia, US

- City
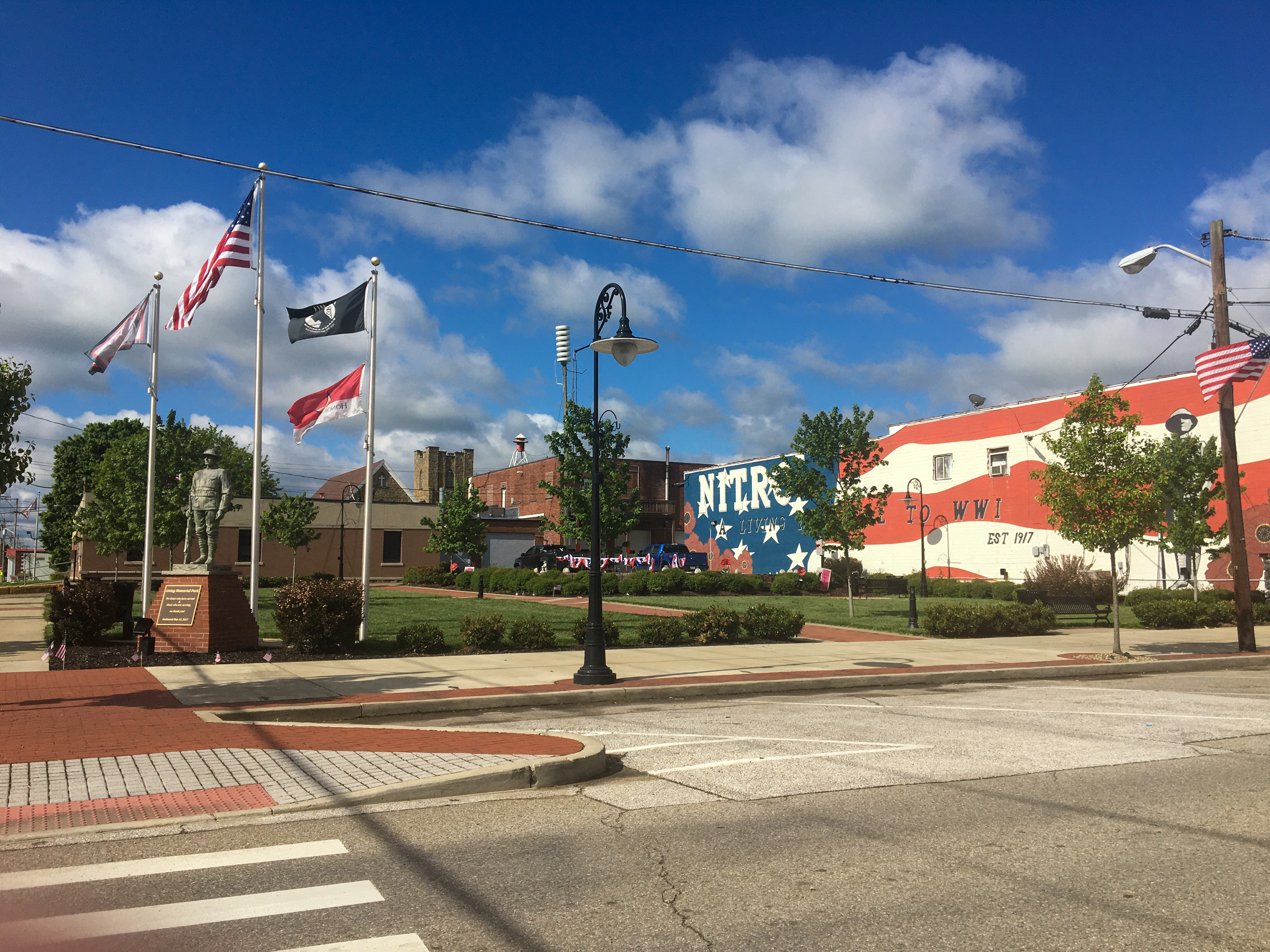
- Living Memorial Park in Nitro, WV

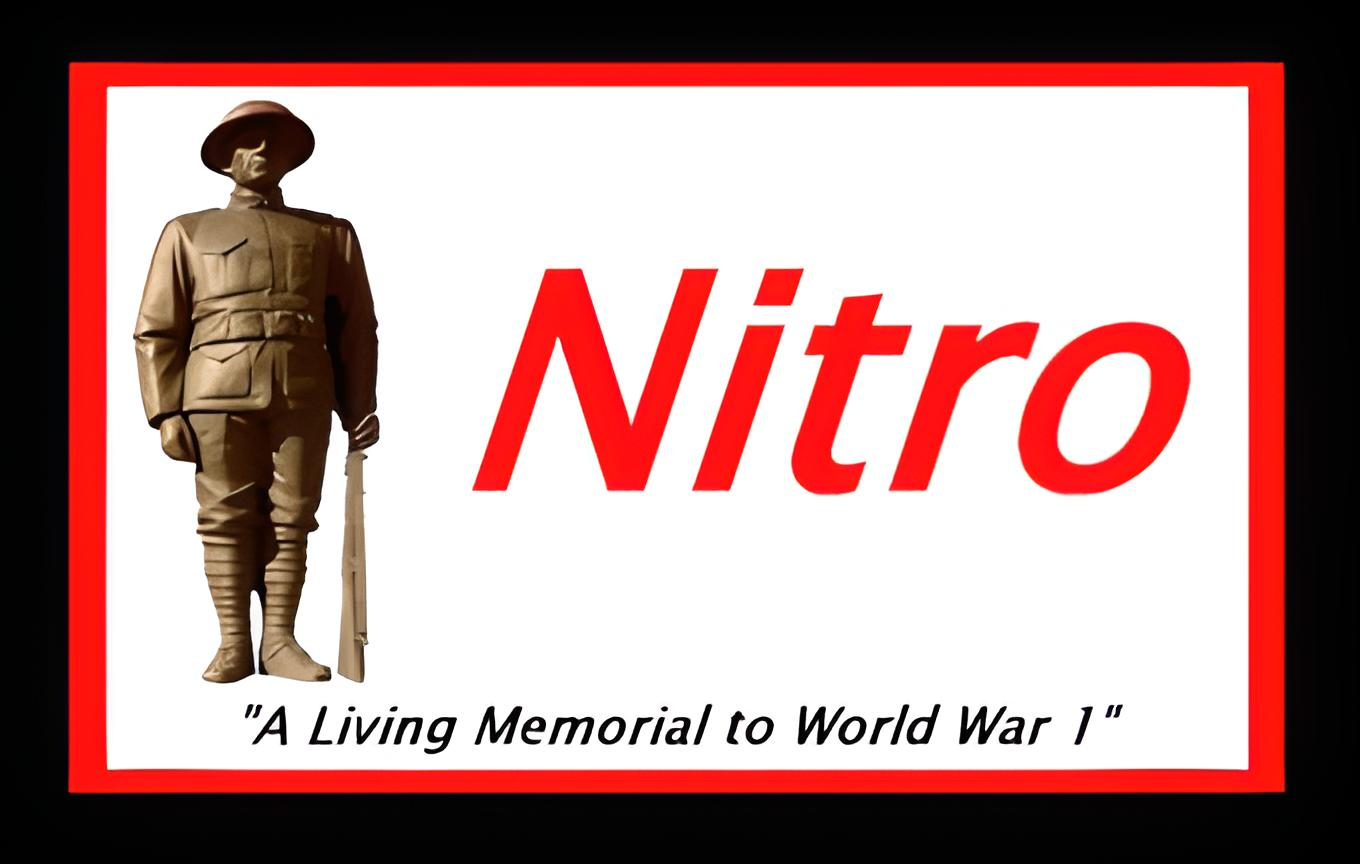
- Flag Seal
- Motto: Living Memorial to World War I
- Location of Nitro in Kanawha and Putnam Counties in West Virginia.

- Location within West Virginia Location within the United States
- Coordinates: 38°24′55″N 81°49′52″W
- Country: United States
- State: West Virginia
- Counties: Kanawha, Putnam
- Incorporated: 1932

Government
  - Type: Municipal Government
  - Mayor: Dave Casebolt
  - Treasurer: John Young

Area
  - Total: 5.82 sq mi (15.07 km^{2})
  - Land: 5.24 sq mi (13.58 km^{2})
  - Water: 0.58 sq mi (1.49 km^{2})
- Elevation: 594 ft (181 m)

Population (2020)
  - Total: 6,624
  - Estimate (2021): 6,518
  - Density: 1,215.5/sq mi (469.29/km^{2})
- Time zone: UTC-5 (Eastern (EST))
  - Summer (DST): UTC-4 (EDT)
- ZIP code: 25143
- Area code: 304/681
- FIPS code: 54-59068
- GNIS feature ID: 1555228
- Website: cityofnitro.org

Nitro is a city in Kanawha and Putnam counties in the U.S. state of West Virginia. It takes its name from a World War I-era nitrocellulose plant. The population was 6,618 according to the 2020 census. It is part of the Charleston metropolitan area.

== History ==
Nitro was incorporated in 1932 by Circuit Court. Its name was selected by the United States government because of the establishment there, during World War I, of a large federal plant for the manufacture of explosives. The name Nitro derives from nitrocellulose, the main ingredient in smokeless gunpowder. Daniel C. Jackling "supervised the construction and operation" of the plant, which by the time of the armistice "was producing one hundred thousand pounds of high explosives per day." The city is known as "a Living Memorial to World War I."

== Geography ==
Nitro is located primarily in Kanawha County. The city lies across the Kanawha River from the city of St. Albans to the south, and is adjacent to the census-designated place of Cross Lanes.

According to the United States Census Bureau, the city has a total area of 4.67 square miles (12.10 km^{2}), of which 4.28 square miles (11.09 km^{2}) is land and 0.39 square miles (1.01 km^{2}) is water.

== Demographics ==
Historical population
Census	Pop.	Note	%±
1940	2,983		—
1950	3,314		11.1%
1960	6,894		108.0%
1970	8,019		16.3%
1980	8,074		0.7%
1990	6,851		−15.1%
2000	6,824		−0.4%
2010	7,178		5.2%
2020	6,624		−7.7%
2021 (est.)	6,518		−1.6%
U.S. Decennial Census; 2014 Estimate

Nitro is a part of the Huntington-Ashland, WV-KY-OH, Metropolitan Statistical Area (MSA). As of the 2010 census, the MSA had a population of 287,702. New definitions from February 28, 2013, placed the population at 363,000.

=== 2020 census ===
As of the 2020 census, Nitro had a population of 6,624. The median age was 42.2 years. 21.0% of residents were under the age of 18 and 21.2% of residents were 65 years of age or older. For every 100 females there were 89.6 males, and for every 100 females age 18 and over there were 88.5 males age 18 and over.

99.9% of residents lived in urban areas, while 0.1% lived in rural areas.

There were 2,912 households in Nitro, of which 26.1% had children under the age of 18 living in them. Of all households, 37.7% were married-couple households, 19.8% were households with a male householder and no spouse or partner present, and 33.9% were households with a female householder and no spouse or partner present. About 34.1% of all households were made up of individuals and 15.9% had someone living alone who was 65 years of age or older.

There were 3,277 housing units, of which 11.1% were vacant. The homeowner vacancy rate was 1.7% and the rental vacancy rate was 10.4%.

Racial composition as of the 2020 census
Race	Number	Percent
White	5,850	88.3%
Black or African American	234	3.5%
American Indian and Alaska Native	34	0.5%
Asian	27	0.4%
Native Hawaiian and Other Pacific Islander	1	0.0%
Some other race	103	1.6%
Two or more races	375	5.7%
Hispanic or Latino (of any race)	150	2.3%

=== 2010 census ===
As of the census of 2010, there were 7,178 people, 3,250 households, and 1,914 families living in the city. The population density was 1,677.1 inhabitants per square mile (647.5/km^{2}). There were 3,507 housing units at an average density of 819.4 units per square mile (316.4 units/km^{2}). The racial makeup of the city was 94.7% White, 2.3% African American, 0.5% Native American, 0.6% Asian, 0.6% from other races, and 1.4% from two or more races. Hispanic or Latino of any race were 1.6% of the population.

There were 3,250 households, of which 25.9% had children under the age of 18 living with them, 41.4% were married couples living together, 12.8% had a female householder with no husband present, 4.8% had a male householder with no wife present, and 41.1% were non-families. 33.9% of all households were made up of individuals, and 12.8% had someone living alone who was 65 years of age or older. The average household size was 2.21 and the average family size was 2.82.

The median age in the city was 40.5 years. 20.4% of residents were under the age of 18; 7.4% were between the ages of 18 and 24; 27.2% were from 25 to 44; 27.7% were from 45 to 64; and 17.3% were 65 years of age or older. The gender makeup of the city was 47.9% male and 52.1% female.

=== 2000 census ===
As of the census of 2000, there were 6,824 people, 3,015 households, and 1,935 families living in the city. The population density was 1,821.2 people per square mile (703.2 people/km^{2}). There were 3,217 housing units at an average density of 858.6 units per square mile (331.5 units/km^{2}). The racial makeup of the city was 96.64% White, 1.63% African American, 0.25% Native American, 0.25% Asian, 0.40% from other races, and 0.84% from two or more races. Hispanic or Latino of any race were 0.54% of the population.

There were 3,015 households, out of which 23.9% had children under the age of 18 living with them, 47.3% were married couples living together, 12.7% had a female householder with no husband present, and 35.8% were non-families. 30.7% of all households were made up of individuals, and 13.9% had someone living alone who was 65 years of age or older. The average household size was 2.26 and the average family size was 2.80.

The age distribution was 20.1% under the age of 18, 8.8% from 18 to 24, 26.4% from 25 to 44, 26.1% from 45 to 64, and 18.7% who were 65 years of age or older. The median age was 41 years. For every 100 females, there were 89.7 males. For every 100 females age 18 and over, there were 87.0 males.

The median income for a household in the city was $32,389, and the median income for a family was $41,367. Males had a median income of $30,086 versus $21,932 for females. The per capita income for the city was $17,453. About 7.3% of families and 10.7% of the population were below the poverty line, including 12.5% of those under age 18 and 14.0% of those age 65 or over.

== Education ==
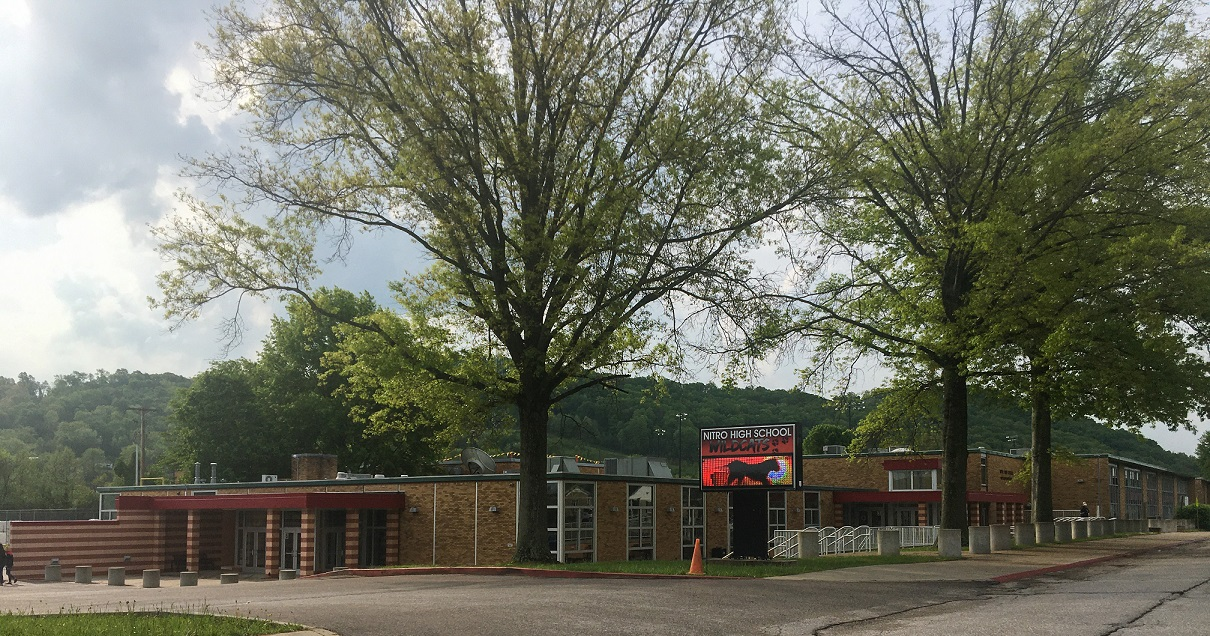
Nitro High School

The city's public school students do not all attend the same schools, because West Virginia school districts are divided strictly along county lines, without regard to city boundaries.

Kanawha County residents are served by the following schools in the city:

- Nitro Elementary School (public)
- Nitro High School (public)

There is no public middle school in Nitro on either side of the county line, nor is there any public school within the Putnam County portion of the city. Middle school students in Kanawha County must bus to Andrew Jackson Middle School in Cross Lanes. Putnam County students must bus to Rock Branch Elementary, Poca Middle, and Poca High.

== Environment ==
The reach of the Kanawha River Valley between Belle and Nitro is known locally as the "Chemical Valley", which, at its peak in the late 1950s and early 1960s, was the leading producer of chemicals in the world (Henry, 1974). During World War I the government built an $80 million complex in Nitro to manufacture explosives and chemicals for the war effort.

The site was located on an 1,800-acre (7.3 km^{2}) cow pasture on the Kanawha River on the flat river valley floodplain. The facility had just been placed in operation when the war ended in November 1918. The first shipment of powder was also the last. Local authorities then sought various chemical companies to occupy the facility which had excellent infrastructure in utilities, transportation and new housing for workers. It was hoped that the former gunpowder complex would become a major chemical manufacturing center, especially for the emerging dye industry in the U.S. that relied on coal and coke by-products as feedstock.

The Kanawha River and water in the adjacent alluvium have been adversely affected by industrial activities (Messinger, 1997).

The chemical manufacturing history of Nitro resulted in environmental impairment, including the Fike/Artel Chemical Site (EPA ID: WVD047989207), which is on the National Priorities List Superfund. The 12-acre (49,000 m^{2}) site was placed on the EPA National Priorities List in 1983. The site is a former World War I chemical munitions plant at which subsequent chemical manufacturing, reclamation and disposal was allegedly conducted.

The Solutia Inc. Nitro Plant, located on the east bank of the Kanawha River approximately one-half mile north of the City of Nitro in Putnam County, is being investigated through the RCRA program. From 1918 to 1921, the facility manufactured explosives including "nitro-powder" to support World War I. When explosives manufacturing processes ceased, the facility was purchased and used for a variety of industries. In 1971, the buildings were used by a heavy chemical company Fike Chemical and further investigation showed improper waste remediation. RCRA Corrective Action activities at this facility are being conducted under the direction of EPA Region 3 and the West Virginia Department of Environmental Protection.

Other RCRA Corrective Action facilities include Great Lakes Chemicals Company (formerly FMC Corporation) and Union Carbide Corp. - PTO (a subsidiary of The Dow Chemical Company).

Due to manufacturing activities, Nitro became known for a distinctive chemical smell—especially in the area of the I-64 bridge. However, the recent shift away from manufacturing in the region has significantly reduced air pollution issues.

=== Agent Orange ===
In February 2012, Monsanto agreed to settle a case covering dioxin contamination around a plant in Nitro that had made Agent Orange. Monsanto agreed to pay up to $9 million for cleanup of affected homes, $84 million for medical monitoring of people affected, and the community's legal fees.

=== Scientific research activities ===
In 2001 Clonaid operated a lab in Nitro that was tied to the Raelians. It was located inside a rented room within a former high school. The FDA said that the equipment in the lab was state-of-the-art and had been bought by former West Virginia state legislator Mark Hunt.

=== Cancer cluster ===
For over 50 years, the Monsanto plant in Nitro, West Virginia, created dioxin waste while producing herbicides, Agent Orange (during the Vietnam War), and different forms of rubber. Recent and past literature has established a link between the Monsanto plant and increased cancer cases within the region. Although evidence seems to support the occurrence of clustering within the Nitro and Saint Albans areas, further epidemiological and spatial studies are required.

== Notable people ==
- Major League Baseball player Lew Burdette was born in Nitro in 1926.
- Country singer Kathy Mattea, who grew up in nearby Cross Lanes, is a graduate of Nitro High School.
- J. R. House, who played for several MLB teams in the early 2000s, was a record-setting quarterback at Nitro High from 1996 through 1998.
- Actor Clark Gable worked at "Explosive Plant C" in Nitro in 1918.
- Major League Baseball umpire Larry Barnett was born in Nitro in 1945
