= Robert Spencer Carr =

American novelist

- Born: March 26, 1909; Washington, D.C., U.S.
- Died: April 28, 1994 (aged 85); Dunedin, Florida, U.S.
- Occupations: Short story writer, novelist
- Writing career
- Period: 1925–1948
- Genres: Science fiction, fantasy

Robert Spencer Carr (March 26, 1909 – April 28, 1994) was an American writer of science fiction and fantasy. He sold his first story to Weird Tales at age 15. At age 17 his novel, The Rampant Age, became a success resulting in a movie contract.

== Alien autopsy claims ==
In January 1974, papers relayed a story attributed to Carr that two flying saucers were being stored in "Hangar 18" at Wright-Patterson Air Force Base. By October, press reported that Carr had also believed in the Aztec, New Mexico, UFO hoax which alleged that 12 alien bodies, "three to four feet tall; white skinned; light haired; blue eyed", had been recovered and autopsied. After Carr publicly claimed Sen. Barry Goldwater had demanded and been denied access, Goldwater reportedly told press of an incident where he had denied access to a military facility, but knew nothing about "12 little men". A Wright-Patterson spokesperson denied the claim, adding that there was no "Hangar 18" on the base. They noted similarities between Carr's tale and the 1969 novel The Fortec Conspiracy.

Carr's son later wrote his father "never went to college or got any kind of advanced degree - yet he is called 'Professor Carr' throughout the UFO literature. In many of his papers, he called himself 'Dr. Carr'". Carr claimed to have knowledge of an autopsy of an alien from space on a US military base.

== Works ==
- Spider-Bite (1926)
- The Rampant Age (1928)
- The Bells of St. Ivan's (1944)
- The Room Beyond (1948)
- Beyond Infinity (1951, stories)
