= John G. Fuller =

American author (1913–1990)

John Grant Fuller, Jr.
- Born: John Grant Fuller, Jr. November 30, 1913; Philadelphia, Pennsylvania, US
- Died: November 7, 1990 (aged 76); Norwalk, Connecticut, US
- Occupation: Author
- Employer: Saturday Review
- Spouse: Elizabeth
- Children: 4

John Grant Fuller, Jr. (November 30, 1913 – November 7, 1990) was a New England–based American author of several nonfiction books and newspaper articles, mainly focusing on the theme of extraterrestrials and the supernatural. For many years he wrote a regular column for the Saturday Review magazine, called "Trade Winds". His books include We Almost Lost Detroit, The Ghost of Flight 401, Incident at Exeter, and The Interrupted Journey. He also served as writer, producer, and director on a number of TV shows and documentary films.

== Writing ==
Incident at Exeter (1966) concerned a series of well-publicized unidentified flying object (UFO) sightings in and around the town of Exeter, New Hampshire in the fall of 1965 (see the Exeter incident). Fuller personally investigated the sightings and interviewed many of the eyewitnesses; he also claimed to have seen a UFO himself during his investigation.

The Interrupted Journey: Two Lost Hours "Aboard a Flying Saucer" (1966) tells the story of the Barney and Betty Hill abduction. The Hills were a married couple who claimed to have been abducted in 1961 by the occupants of a UFO in the White Mountains of New Hampshire while returning home from a vacation. The book was the first to seriously claim that competent, reliable witnesses were being abducted by UFOs for medical and scientific experiments. The book remains one of the most influential in UFO history, and has been hotly debated since its publication. Like The Ghost of Flight 401 three years later, The Interrupted Journey was turned into a made-for-television movie in 1975.

Aliens in the Skies (1969) is based on transcripts from the July 29, 1968, Congressional Hearing Before the House Committee on Science and Astronautics where experts such as Carl Sagan and J. Allen Hynek testified on the possibility of UFOs.

Fuller wrote The Great Soul Trial (1969) about the disappearance of Arizona miner James Kidd and the later trial regarding his will, which left his fortune to anyone who could prove the existence of the human soul. The book was published prior to the final resolution of the case in 1971.

Arigo: Surgeon of the Rusty Knife (1974) was about the life and purported supernatural healing powers of a psychic surgeon in Brazil. A poor review in The New York Review of Books led to a public disagreement between Mr. Fuller and the reviewer, Martin Gardner. Gardner protesting Crowell-Collier's publishing of Fuller's book Arigo withdrew publication of his own (Gardner's) book.

His book We Almost Lost Detroit (1975) deals with a serious accident at the Fermi nuclear power plant near Detroit. The book title was later the title of a song by Gil Scott-Heron on the No Nukes live album recorded by the Musicians United for Safe Energy.

The Ghost of Flight 401 (1976) was based on the tragic Eastern Air Lines Flight 401 airplane crash in December 1972, and the alleged supernatural events which followed; it was eventually turned into a popular 1978 made-for-television movie.

Are The Kids All Right? (1981) focused on The Who concert disaster at Riverfront Coliseum in Cincinnati on December 3, 1979. Fuller suggested that hard rock music's hypnotic rhythms mean the music "ignites and is responsible for unprecedented and potentially disastrous concert violence on a regular and continuing basis".

He wrote two plays—The Pink Elephant, which opened in 1953, and Love Me Little, which opened in 1958, both on Broadway.

The Poison That Fell From the Sky (1977) is about dioxin poisoning following a chemical plant disaster in Seveso, Italy. In reviewing Fuller's book, Jeff Greenfield, reviewer for The New York Times, commented that Fuller was known for "raising the most unsettling of questions"; Fuller was also known for his ability to obtain and use government documents in his investigations.

== Film and television ==
Fuller was the writer, producer, and director of Labor of Love (1964), for the US Information Agency. This film " illustrates civil service work in the U.S. on three levels - federal, state, and municipal - by detailing the work of a forest ranger, a social worker, and a physical therapist. The film points out the employees' devotion to their jobs and the personal satisfaction that comes with doing a good job in the role of public servant." He also wrote, produced, and directed the USIA film production Basketball: The Team Game (1971).

== Personal life ==
Fuller was married to a Northwest Airlines flight attendant who was the researcher mentioned in his book "Ghost of Flight 401".

Fuller died of lung cancer in 1990.

== Bibliography ==
=== Books ===
- The Gentleman Conspirators: The Story of Price-Fixers in the Electrical Industry, 1962
- Incident at Exeter: The Story of "Unidentified Flying Objects Over America Now, 1966
- The Interrupted Journey: Two Lost Hours "Aboard a Flying Saucer", 1966
- The Day of St. Anthony's Fire, 1968
- Aliens In The Skies - The New UFO Battle of the Scientists, 1969
- The Great Soul Trial, 1969
- 200,000,000 Guinea Pigs: New Dangers in Everyday Foods, Drugs and Cosmetics, 1972
- Fever!: The Hunt for a New Killer Virus, 1974
- Arigo: Surgeon of the Rusty Knife, 1974
- We Almost Lost Detroit, 1975
- The Ghost of Flight 401, 1976
- Poison That Fell from the Sky, 1977
- The Airmen Who Would Not Die, 1979
- Are the Kids All Right?, 1981
- The Day We Bombed Utah, 1984
- The Ghost of 29 Megacycles, 1985
- Tornado Watch Number 211, 1987

=== Notable newspaper articles ===
- "A Communication Concerning UFOs", Saturday Review, vol. 50, February 4, 1967, pp. 70–72
- "Flying Saucer Fiasco", Magazine Look, May 14, 1968, pp. 58–63
- "Aliens in the Skies: The Scientific Rebuttal to the Condon Committee Report", Putnam, 1969
