= Exeter incident =

UFO Sighting in New Hampshire

- Date: September 3, 1965 (61 years ago)
- Location: Kensington, New Hampshire, US; 42.946917°N 70.956371°W
- Also known as: Incident at Exeter
- Type: UFO sighting

Location of Kensington, New Hampshire

The Exeter incident or Incident at Exeter was a highly publicized UFO sighting that occurred on September 3, 1965, approximately 3 miles (5 km) south of Exeter, New Hampshire, in the neighboring town of Kensington. Although several separate sightings had been reported in the Exeter area by numerous witnesses in the weeks leading up to the specific incident, it was the September 3 sighting, involving a local teenager and two police officers which became, by far, the most famous. In 2011, Skeptical Inquirer offered an explanation of the incident, based on details reported by the eyewitnesses.

== Sightings ==
=== Norman Muscarello ===
On September 3, 1965, at approximately 2:00 a.m., 18-year-old Norman Muscarello was hitchhiking to his home in Exeter along New Hampshire Route 150. Muscarello had graduated from high school the previous June and was three weeks away from leaving for service in the United States Navy. He had been visiting his girlfriend at her parents' home in nearby Amesbury, Massachusetts, around 10 miles (16 km) southeast of Exeter. Since he had recently sold his car, Muscarello would hitchhike to and from Amesbury; however, at that hour of the morning there was little traffic on the highway, and Muscarello had walked a good part of the distance.

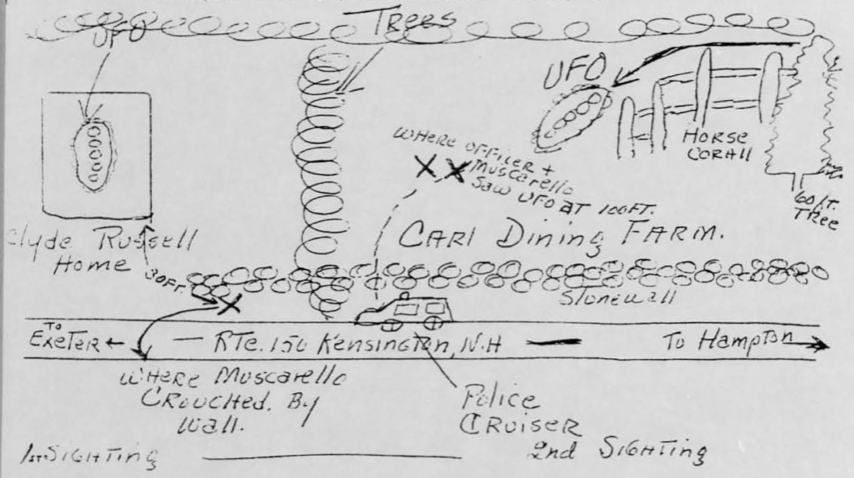
Hand-drawn map of the Exeter incident sightings, from Project Blue Book archives

After reaching Kensington, a few miles outside Exeter, Muscarello noticed five flashing bright red lights in the distance, which he initially believed to be the lights of a police car or fire engine. As he drew nearer, he was startled to see the lights were hovering in the air just above the trees and illuminating a nearby field and two houses in brilliant red light. One house belonged to the Dining family, who were not at home at the time, the other to a family named Russell. Muscarello estimated the object to be 80 to 90 feet (24 to 27 m) in diameter. He became terrified as the object, which made absolutely no sound, began to move steadily towards him. Panicking, he dived into a ditch beside the road. The lights then changed direction and hovered over the Dining farmhouse; Muscarello ran to the Russell's house, pounded on the door and yelled for help, but no one answered (the Russells later stated they heard Muscarello at the door, but were too frightened to open it). The object then moved away and disappeared over the trees of the nearby woods. Seeing the headlights of an approaching car, Muscarello ran into the road and forced it to stop. The couple in the car drove the frightened youth to the Exeter police station.

At the police station, Muscarello, pale and visibly shaken, told his story to officer Reginald Toland, who worked the night desk. Toland knew Muscarello, and was impressed by his obvious fear and genuinely agitated state. Toland radioed police officer Eugene Bertrand Jr., who earlier in the evening had passed a frightened woman sitting in her car on New Hampshire Route 108. When Bertrand stopped to ask if she had a problem, the woman told him that a "huge object with flashing red lights" had followed her car from Epping to Exeter, a distance of about 12 miles (19 km) and hovered over the car before flying away. Bertrand considered her a "kook", but did stay with her for several minutes until she had calmed down and was ready to resume her drive.

After arriving at the police station and hearing Muscarello's similar story, Bertrand decided to drive to the Dining farm with Muscarello to investigate the field where he had seen the lights.

=== Officers Bertrand and Hunt ===
After Bertrand drove Muscarello back to the area of his sighting, they at first saw nothing unusual; however, when they left the car and walked into the field and towards the woods where Muscarello had first seen the lights, some horses in a nearby corral became frightened and began neighing loudly, kicking the fence and sides of a barn; dogs in the area also began barking and howling. Bertrand and Muscarello then saw an object slowly rise from the trees beyond the corral. Bertrand described the UFO as "this huge, dark object as big as a barn over there, with red flashing lights on it." The object moved silently towards them, swaying back and forth. Instinctively remembering his police training, Bertrand dropped to one knee, drew his revolver, and pointed it at the object. He then decided that shooting would not be wise, so he reholstered the revolver, grabbed Muscarello, and both ran back to the patrol car. Bertrand radioed another Exeter policeman, David Hunt, for assistance, and while the two waited in the car for Hunt to arrive they continued to observe the object. According to UFO historian Jerome Clark, Bertrand and Muscarello "observed the object as it hovered 100 feet away and at 100 feet altitude. It rocked back and forth. The pulsating red lights flashed in rapid sequence, first from right to left, then left to right, each cycle consuming no more than two seconds; the [local] animals continued to act agitated." The object was still there when Hunt arrived a few minutes later and he also watched it. Finally, the object rose over the trees and disappeared. Hunt soon heard the engines of a B-47 bomber as it flew overhead, and he later told journalist John G. Fuller that "You could tell the difference" between the UFO and the bomber, "there was no comparison." The three men drove back to the Exeter police station and immediately filed separate reports on what they had seen. Bertrand then drove Muscarello home and told his mother about the incident.

== Other area sightings ==
The sightings by Muscarello and the two policemen received national publicity. John G. Fuller, at that time a regular columnist for Saturday Review, was in Exeter investigating the sightings. He interviewed a number of people in the area who also claimed to have witnessed strange lights and unusual objects. Among them was Ron Smith, a senior at Exeter High School, who told Fuller that about two or three weeks after Muscarello's sighting, he was with his mother and aunt in their car one evening at 11:30. According to Smith, he, his mother and aunt all saw an object with "a red light on top and the bottom was white and glowed. It appeared to be spinning. It passed over the car once and when it passed over and got in front, it stopped in midair. Then it went back over the car again." Fuller also spoke to police officer Toland at Exeter's police station. Toland told Fuller of a number of calls he had received from Exeter-area residents regarding UFO sightings. A good example of the type of calls Toland had received came from Mrs. Ralph Lindsay. According to Toland "she called in here early, just before dawn. She said it was right out her window as she was calling. It was like a big orange ball, almost as big as the harvest Moon ... and it wasn't the Moon, either ... all the time she was talking to me, her kids were at the window watching it. Now why would people go to all this trouble—people all over the area—if they weren't seeing something real?"

== Air Force investigation and explanation ==
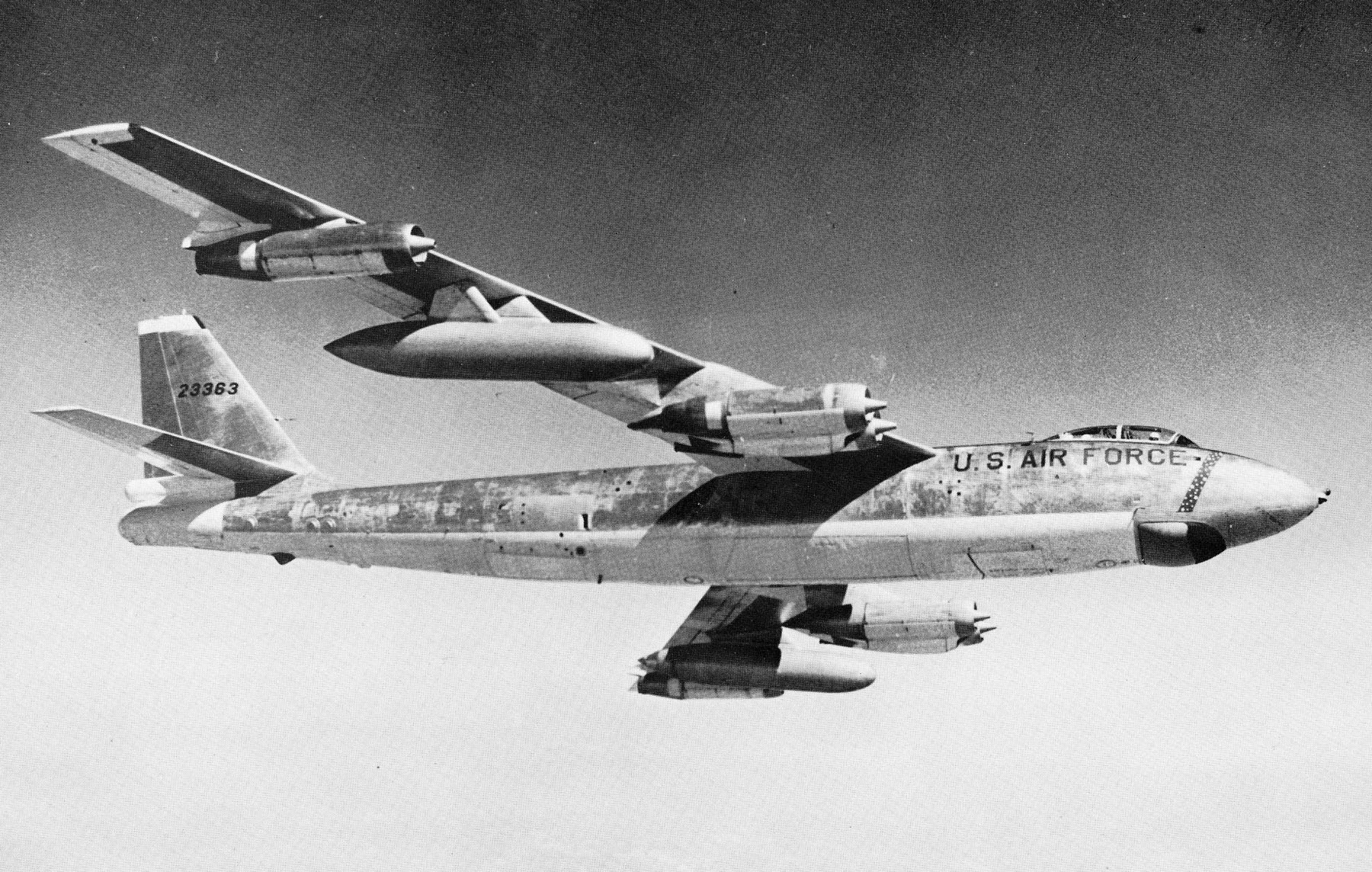
A B-47 in flight

After Exeter's police chief read the reports of Muscarello, Bertrand, Hunt, he called nearby Pease Air Force Base and reported a UFO sighting. The Air Force sent Major David Griffin and Lieutenant Alan Brandt to interview the three men. The Air Force officers asked all three not to report their sighting to the press, but a reporter from the Manchester Union-Leader newspaper had already interviewed them. Major Griffin sent a report of the incident to USAF Major Hector Quintanilla, supervisor of Project Blue Book, the official Air Force research group assigned to investigate UFO reports. Griffin wrote that "At this time I have been unable to arrive at a probable cause of this sighting. The three observers seem to be stable, reliable persons, especially the two patrolmen. I viewed the area of the sighting and found nothing in the area that could be the probable cause. Pease AFB had five B-47 aircraft flying in the area but I do not believe that they had any connection with this sighting."

Before Project Blue Book could send this evaluation to the Pentagon, however, Griffen and Brandt had already issued their explanation of Muscarello and the two policemen's sighting to the press. The Pentagon informed reporters that the three men had seen "nothing more than stars and planets twinkling ... owing to a temperature inversion." Project Blue Book then issued its own explanation, stating that "Operation Big Blast ... a SAC/NORAD training mission" had been active on the night of the sighting and that it could have accounted for the UFO. Major Quintanilla, in a letter to policemen Bertrand and Hunt, wrote "in addition to aircraft from this operation [Big Blast], there were also five B-47 aircraft flying in your area during this period ... since there were many aircraft in the area, at the time, and there were no reports of unidentified objects from personnel engaged in this operation, we might then assume that the objects [you] observed between midnight and two a.m. might be associated with this military air operation." Quintanilla also added that "If, however, these aircraft were noted by either of you, this would tend to eliminate this air operation as a possible explanation for the objects observed."

=== Controversy and Air Force retraction ===
Muscarello, Bertrand, and Hunt all strongly disagreed with the Air Force explanation. The two policemen sent a letter to Project Blue Book in which they stated, "As you can imagine, we have been the subject of considerable ridicule since the Pentagon released its 'final evaluation' of our sighting of September 3, 1965...both Patrolman Hunt and myself saw this object at close range, checked it out with each other, confirmed and reconfirmed that it was not any type of conventional aircraft ... and went to considerable trouble to confirm that the weather was clear, there was no wind, no chance of weather inversion, and that what we were seeing was in no way a military or civilian aircraft." Bertrand also noted that their UFO sighting took place nearly an hour after Operation Big Blast was said to have ended, which eliminated the operation as a possible cause of the sighting. When Project Blue Book did not respond to their letter, on December 29, 1965—nearly four months after the sighting—the two men sent another letter to Blue Book in which they wrote that the object they observed "was absolutely silent with no rush of air from jets or chopper blades whatsoever. And it did not have any wings or tail ... it lit up the entire field, and two nearby houses turned completely red."

In addition to Muscarello and the policemen, John G. Fuller also ridiculed the Air Force explanation in print. He wrote that he had observed an unusual object himself near Exeter and that it was being chased by an Air Force jet fighter. Raymond E. Fowler, the New England investigator for the National Investigations Committee On Aerial Phenomena (NICAP), also filed a detailed report on the Exeter sightings. In his view the Air Force explanation was also incorrect. At one point, an Air Force officer claimed that the UFOs people had been observing were merely lights from nearby Pease AFB. To prove it, he had the lights activated before a large crowd who were gathered some distance away. According to Fowler, "he ordered personnel at the base to turn the lights on. Everybody looked and waited—and nothing happened. Frustrated, he yelled into the mic to turn on the lights. A voice replied that the lights were on. The very embarrassed officer slunk back into the seat of the staff car and drove off amongst the laughs and jeers of the crowd."

In January 1966, Lieutenant Colonel John Spaulding, from the Office of the Secretary of the Air Force, finally replied to the policemen's two letters. Spaulding wrote that "based on additional information submitted to our UFO investigation officer, Wright-Patterson AFB, Ohio, we have been unable to identify the object you observed on September 3, 1965."

== Aftermath ==
Incident at Exeter
- Author: John G. Fuller
- Language: English
- Published: 1966
- Publication place: United States
- Website: Incident at Exeter at Internet Archive

The Exeter UFO sightings—and particularly the September 3 sightings involving Norman Muscarello and police officers Eugene Bertrand and David Hunt—remain among the best-documented and best-publicized in UFO history. In 1966, Fuller published an account of his investigation into the case. Entitled Incident at Exeter, it made The New York Times Best Seller list. For the rest of his life, Muscarello insisted that what he had witnessed that night was real and not an ordinary object. Muscarello died in April, 2003, at age 55 following a brief illness. Bertrand died in 1998, and Hunt in 2011. In 2010, the Exeter Kiwanis Club started the "Exeter UFO Festival" as a fundraiser to benefit children's charities in the Exeter area.

=== Skeptical Inquirer explanation ===
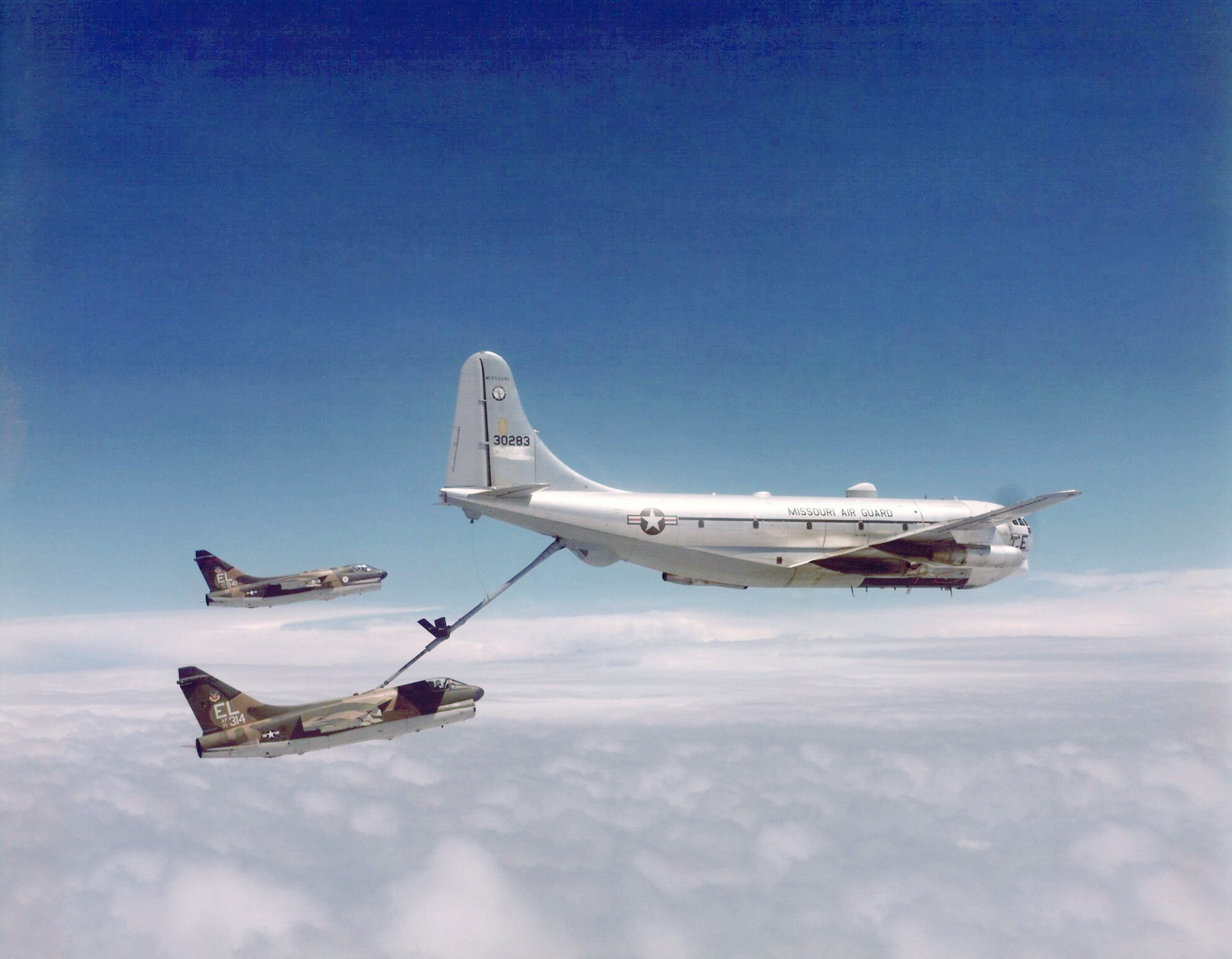
A KC-97, at right with refueling boom extended, and two A-7 aircraft

In 2011, Joe Nickell, a prominent skeptic, and James McGaha, a retired Air Force major, proposed a possible explanation for the incident in Skeptical Inquirer. As a pilot, McGaha had been refueled in flight by KC-97 tanker aircraft like the ones stationed at Pease AFB near Exeter in 1965. In the article, he claimed to have recognized the flashing red light pattern reported by the witnesses Bertrand and Muscarello: one, two, three, four, five, four, three, two, one. According to Nickell and McGaha, before refueling, the underbelly of the KC-97 tankers flashed five very bright red lights in that same pattern. The refueling boom hung down at a 60-degree angle and would flutter in the air currents when not being controlled by the boom operator—hence, "floating like a leaf" per witness Muscarello.

== See also ==
- List of reported UFO sightings

== Sources ==
- Clark, Jerome. The UFO Book: Encyclopedia of the Extraterrestrial. Visible Ink Press, 1997. ISBN 978-1578590292.
- Fowler, Raymond. Casebook of a UFO Investigator. Prentice-Hall Books, 1981. ISBN 978-0131174320.
- Fuller, John G. Incident at Exeter: The Story of Unidentified Flying Objects Over America Today. G. T. Putnam's Sons, 1966.
- Peebles, Curtis. Watch the Skies! A Chronicle of the Flying Saucer Myth. Berkley Books, 1995. ISBN 978-0425151174.
