= Hellier =

Hellier may refer to:

== People ==
- Hellier de Carteret (fl. 1563–1578), Seigneur of Sark
- Cyril and Libbye Hellier (born 1952), identical twins and American operatic sopranos
- Kirsten Hellier (born 1969), New Zealand javelin thrower
- Trudy Hellier, Australian actress, director and screenwriter

== Other uses ==
- Hellier, Kentucky, an unincorporated community in Pike County
- Hellier (Documentary Series), a documentary series about mysterious synchronicities in Hellier, Kentucky
- Hellier Stradivarius, a c. 1679 violin made by Antonio Stradivari

== See also ==
- Heller (disambiguation)
- Helliar (disambiguation)
