= Mothman (disambiguation) =

Mothman is a legendary creature reportedly seen in Point Pleasant, West Virginia.

Mothman may also refer to:

- Mothman (film), a 2010 television film by Syfy
- The Mothman of Point Pleasant, a 2017 documentary film
- The Mothman Prophecies, a 1975 book by John Keel, focusing on sightings of the Mothman
  - The Mothman Prophecies (film), a 2002 film adapted from John Keel's book
- Mothman, a fictional character from the Watchmen comic books
- Mothmonsterman, a recurring Aqua Teen Hunger Force character

== See also ==
- Mothra
