= Grinning Man =

Grinning Man may refer to:

- Indrid Cold, AKA the Grinning Man, a legendary being associated with the Mothman
- "Grinning Man", a short story written by Orson Scott Card for the 1998 anthology book Legends, set in The Tales of Alvin Maker universe
- "The Grinning Man", a 2009 episode of the British television series Jonathan Creek
- The Grinning Man, a 2016 stage musical adaptation of Victor Hugo's novel The Man Who Laughs
