= Silver Bridge =

Former suspension bridge (stood 1928–1967)

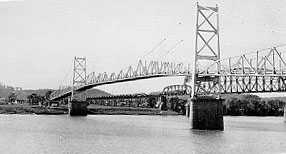
- The Silver Bridge upon completion in 1928
- Coordinates: 38°50′42″N 82°08′28″W
- Crossed: Ohio River
- Locale: Point Pleasant, Mason County, West Virginia, United States; Kanauga, Gallia County, Ohio, United States
- Official name: Point Pleasant Bridge
- Followed by: Silver Memorial Bridge

Characteristics
- Design: Suspension bridge
- Material: Steel
- Total length: 2,235 feet (681 m)
- Longest span: 700 feet (210 m)
- Piers in water: 2
- Design life: 39 years (until collapse)

History
- Designer: J. E. Greiner Company
- Constructed by: American Bridge Company
- Opened: May 30, 1928
- Collapsed: December 15, 1967

Location
- Interactive map of Silver Bridge

The Silver Bridge was an eyebar-chain suspension bridge built in 1928 that carried U.S. Route 35 over the Ohio River, connecting Point Pleasant, West Virginia, and Gallipolis, Ohio. Officially named the Point Pleasant Bridge, it was popularly known as the Silver Bridge for the color of its aluminum paint.

On December 15, 1967, the Silver Bridge collapsed amid heavy rush-hour traffic, resulting in the deaths of 46 people, two of whom were never found. Investigation of the wreckage soon pointed to the failure of a single eyebar in one of the suspension chains as the primary cause—a finding noted in a preliminary report released within 10 months of the collapse. However, to explain why that eyebar failed—a failure triggered by a flaw just 0.1 inches (2.5 mm) deep, which led to a fracture—required significantly more time and effort to uncover, with the final accident report taking three years to complete. The collapse led to significant changes in the way bridges in the U.S. are inspected and maintained.

The collapsed bridge was replaced by the Silver Memorial Bridge in 1969.

== History of eyebar-chain bridge construction ==
At the time of the Silver Bridge construction, eyebar bridges had been built for about 100 years. Such bridges had usually been constructed from redundant bar links, using rows of four to six bars, sometimes using several such chains in parallel. An example can be seen in the Clifton Suspension Bridge, designed by Isambard Kingdom Brunel having chain eyebars that are redundant in two dimensions; this early suspension bridge is still in service. Other bridges of similar design include the earlier road bridge over the Menai Strait built by Thomas Telford in 1826; the Széchenyi Chain Bridge in Budapest, built in 1839–1849, destroyed in the closing days of World War II by retreating Germans in 1945, and rebuilt identically by 1949, with redundant chains and hangers; and the Three Sisters, three self-anchored suspension bridges in Pittsburgh of similar design and construction period (from 1924 to 1928), each with suspension chains consisting of at least eight eyebars per link.

== Silver Bridge structure ==
=== Low redundancy, high strength ===
The eyebars in the Silver Bridge offered little to no redundancy, as each chain link consisted of just two eyebars in parallel. (Each bar was 45–55 feet long and 2 inches thick; bars were joined together at the eyeholes using cylindrical pins 11.5 inches in diameter.) These eyebars were made of a new, higher-strength steel (more than twice the tensile strength of other steels of that era), which meant fewer eyebars per link were needed to achieve the required strength to support the bridge (earlier such bridges often used four or more eyebars per link). However, with only two eyebars per link, the failure of one of them would hugely increase the loading on the other, making failure of a suspension chain—and the collapse of the entire bridge—far more likely. Accident investigators found that "[h]ad there been three or more eyebars per link, there would have been the possibility that the failure of one bar would not have led to disaster."

By comparison, the Brooklyn Bridge used suspension cables made up of thousands of individual wires each to provide the cables a relatively high safety factor of six. Such a cable also has an extremely high level of redundancy, with the failure of a single wire having almost no effect on its overall strength. During the Brooklyn Bridge's construction, it was discovered that some substandard steel wire had been installed in the cables. To compensate, 150 more good steel wires were added to each cable, supplementing each's 5,434 wires. The designer's son, Washington Roebling, decided the safety factor may have been reduced, but remained more than sufficient.

=== Rocker towers ===
The two towers that supported the two suspension chains rose nearly 131 feet (40 m) from the bridge's main piers. They featured a "rocker" design, which allowed them to tilt slightly at their bases in response to unbalanced loading on the bridge, or to changes in chain length due to temperature change. Prior to their use on the Silver Bridge, rocker towers had been used on a similar bridge in Brazil and, before that, on two large bridges in Europe. Although the rocker towers required the bridge's suspension chains to keep them upright, their ability to tilt allowed the towers to minimize bending stresses—which standard, fixed-base towers must be designed to resist—resulting in a simpler tower design that used less material than fixed towers, and cost significantly less to build.

Early into the collapse investigation, the rocker towers provided a significant clue as to the failure's cause and location. Investigators noticed that both towers had fallen during the collapse, a strong indication that a suspension chain had broken—since neither tower could stand upright without the support of intact chains. (The towers themselves showed no sign of failure.) And the fact that both fell eastward (toward the West Virginia side) clearly indicated a chain break occurring somewhere west of the tower on the western side (i.e., Ohio side) of the bridge. (By contrast, a chain break occurring, say, in the center part of the span would have resulted in the towers falling in opposite directions, away from each other.)

== Design loads ==
The bridge, which was designed in 1926–27, generally conformed to the engineering standards of its era, according to the investigation into the bridge's collapse, and the investigation's review of the original stress calculations underlying the design found no significant errors. A few years earlier, in 1923, AASHO, a national standards-setting organization, had released documentation to aid engineers in designing bridges—providing quality-control specifications and guidelines on topics such as computing forces and loads, types and properties of steel, and estimating future traffic levels.

The bridge's eyebars, which used a new, stronger steel, offered a maximum allowable stress of 50,000 psi, significantly higher than most other steels then in use, and the bridge had a design safety factor of 1.50, within engineering norms. Investigators into the collapse found no indication that the bridge had been overloaded, even on the day it failed. Despite the bridge's age and the heavy traffic on it at the time of its collapse, the load it was carrying was found to be within its normal capacity; and the location where the failure occurred was at less than half the maximum "live" load it was designed to handle when the collapse began.

== Victims ==
According to the Point Pleasant River Museum, a total of 44 of 46 victims were recovered and identified following the collapse of the Silver Bridge. Additionally, 32 vehicles were lost or destroyed.

=== Recovered victims ===
- Albert A. Adler Jr, Gallipolis, OH
- J. O. Bennett, Walnut Cove, NC
- Leo Blackman, Richmond, VA
- Kristye Boggs, Vinton, OH
- Margaret Boggs, Vinton, OH
- Hilda Byus, Point Pleasant, WV
- Kimberly Byus, Point Pleasant, WV
- Melvin Cantrell, Gallipolis Ferry, WV
- Thomas A. Cantrell, Gallipolis, OH
- Donna Jean Casey, Gallipolis, OH
- Cecil Counts, Gallipolis Ferry, WV
- Horace Cremeans, Route 1, Gallipolis, OH
- Harold Cundiff, Winston-Salem, NC
- Alonzo Luther Darst, Cheshire, OH
- Alma Duff, Point Pleasant, WV
- James Hawkins, Westerville, OH
- Bobby L. Head, Gallipolis, OH
- Forrest Raymond Higley, Bidwell, OH
- Alva B. Lane, Route 1, Gallipolis, OH
- Thomas "Bus" Howard Lee, Gallipolis, OH
- G. H. Mabe, Jamestown, NC
- Darlene Mayes, Kanauga, OH
- Gerald McMannus, South Point, OH
- James Richard Maxwell, Gallipolis, OH
- James F. Meadows, Point Pleasant, WV
- Timothy Meadows, Point Pleasant, WV
- Frederick D. Miller, Gallipolis, OH
- Ronnie G. Moore, Gallipolis, OH
- Nora Isabelle Nibert, Gallipolis Ferry, WV
- Darius E. Northup, Gallipolis Ferry, WV
- James O. Pullen, Middleport, OH
- Leo "Doc" Sanders, Point Pleasant, WV
- Ronald Sims, Gallipolis, OH
- Charles T. Smith, Bidwell, OH
- Oma Mae Smith, Bidwell, OH
- Maxine Sturgeon, Kanauga, OH
- Denzil Taylor, Point Pleasant, WV
- Glenna Mae Taylor, Point Pleasant, WV
- Robert Eugene Towe, Cana, VA
- Victor William Turner, Point Pleasant, WV
- Marvin Wamsley, Point Pleasant, WV
- Lillian Eleanor Wedge, Point Pleasant, WV
- Paul D. Wedge, Point Pleasant, WV
- James Alfred White, Point Pleasant, WV

=== Unrecovered Victims ===
- Kathy Byus, Point Pleasant, WV
- Maxine Turner, Point Pleasant, WV

== Wreckage analysis ==
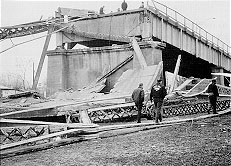
The collapsed Silver Bridge, as seen from the Ohio side

The bridge failure was due to a defect in a single link, known as eyebar 330, on the north of the Ohio subsidiary chain, the first link below the top of the Ohio tower. A small crack was formed through fretting wear at the bearing, and grew through internal corrosion, a problem known as stress corrosion cracking. The crack was only about 0.1 inches (2.5 mm) deep when the link failed, breaking in a brittle fashion.

When the lower side of the eyebar failed, all the load was transferred to the other side of the eyebar, which then failed by ductile overload. The joint was then held together only by three eyebars, and another slipped off the pin at the center of the bearing, hence the chain was completely severed. A collapse of the entire structure was inevitable since all parts of a suspension bridge are in equilibrium with one another.

The damage to the link would have been difficult to see during inspection of the bridge:

Inspection prior to construction would not have been able to notice the tiny crack ... the only way to detect the fracture would have been to disassemble the eye-bar. The technology used for inspection at the time was not capable of detecting such cracks.

== Aftermath ==
The collapse focused much-needed attention on the condition of older bridges, leading to intensified inspection protocols and numerous eventual replacements. There were only two bridges built to a similar design, one upstream at St. Marys, West Virginia, and the notably longer Hercílio Luz Bridge at Florianópolis, Brazil. The St. Marys bridge was immediately closed to traffic and was demolished by the state in 1971. (A small truss bridge remained to allow access to an island in the river.) The Hi Carpenter Memorial Bridge was later built to replace the demolished bridge.

The Hercílio Luz Bridge remained in active service until 1991. Although both it and the Silver Bridge used the same type of high-strength steel for the eyebars, it was built to a higher safety factor than the West Virginia bridge and had greater redundancy, with each suspension chain using an array of four eyebars per link, compared to just two per link for the Silver Bridge. However, in 1991, the Florianópolis bridge was closed due to high levels of corrosion. Following extensive renovation, it reopened in December 2019.

Modern non-destructive testing methods allow some of the older bridges to remain in service, but with tighter weight restrictions. Most heavily used bridges of this type have been replaced with bridges of more modern design.

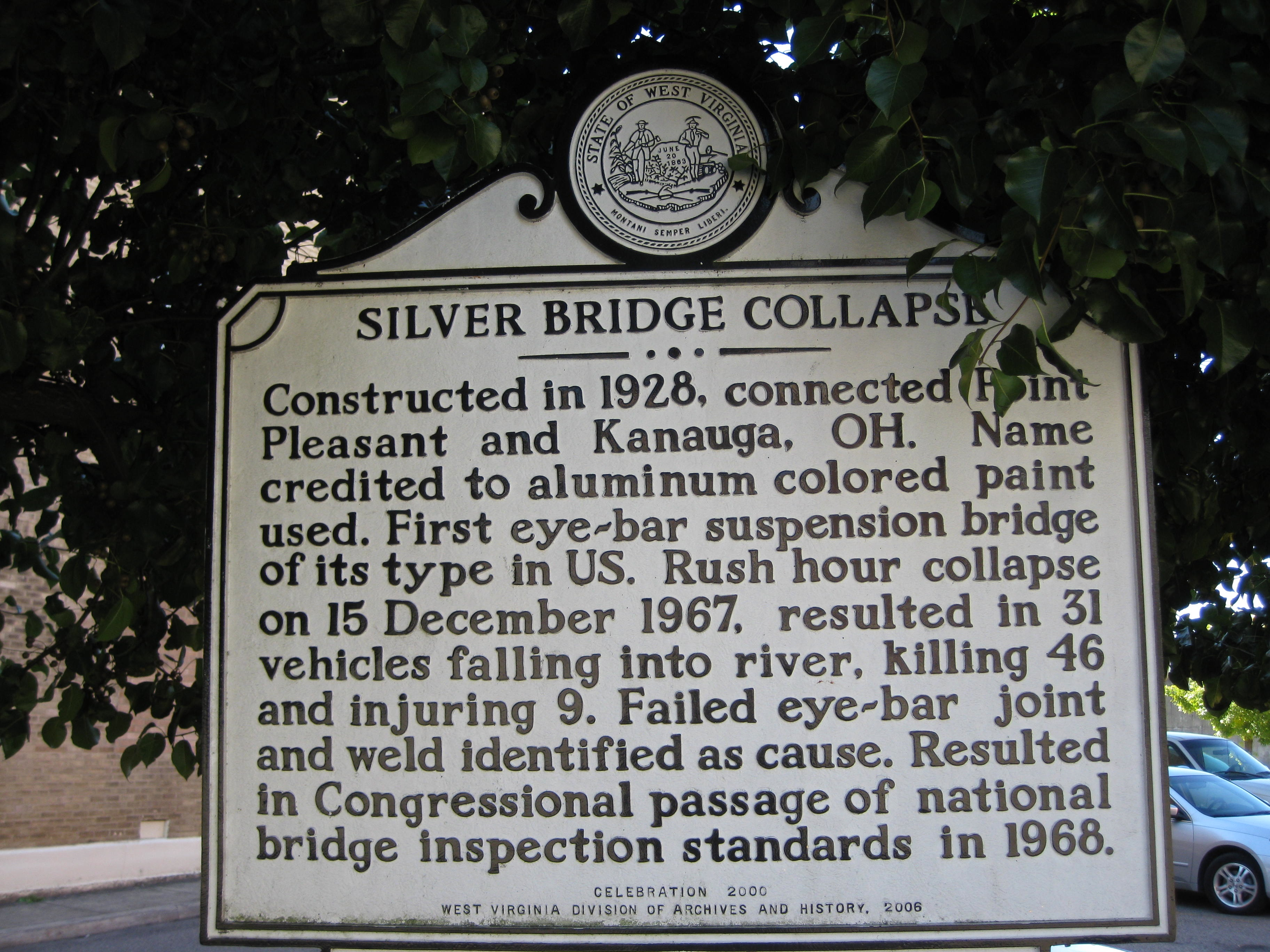
Memorial plaque located near the original site of the bridge

The collapse inspired legislation to ensure that older bridges were regularly inspected and maintained; aging infrastructure still remains a problem in the United States, however. In 1983, the Mianus River Bridge in Greenwich, Connecticut, collapsed, causing the deaths of three drivers. In 2007, the I-35W Mississippi River bridge disaster in Minneapolis, Minnesota, resulted in 13 deaths. In early September 2009, the failure of an eyebar in the San Francisco–Oakland Bay Bridge was discovered during a scheduled closure, resulting in an emergency repair to reinforce the failed member.

A memorial was installed in Point Pleasant to commemorate the 46 bridge-collapse victims.

A scale model of the original Silver Bridge is on display at the Point Pleasant River Museum. An archive of literature about the bridge is also kept there for public inspection. On the lower ground floor, the museum displayed an eyebar assembly from the original bridge. The museum closed on July 1, 2018, when it received heavy damage due to an attic fire but was later moved to a new building and reopened in 2024. The Silver Bridge exhibit was able to be salvaged.

Another eyebar example has been erected for public viewing at a small rest area on the Ohio side of the river, along Route 7.

The bridge has been designated as a National Historic Civil Engineering Landmark by the American Society of Civil Engineers as its collapse ultimately led to the creation of the first national bridge inspection program in the Federal-Aid Highway Act of 1968.

== Legacy ==
Reviewing the collapse and subsequent investigation in his 2012 book To Forgive Design: Understanding Failure, engineering historian Henry Petroski finds it "a cautionary tale for engineers of every kind." As a result of the thoroughness of the investigation, the cause of the disaster was precisely and indisputably found to be "a design that inadvertently made inspection all but impossible and failure all but inevitable. If ever a design was to blame for a failure, this was it."

Petroski does not fault the bridge's designers, who were unaware of many of these hazards. Instead, he points to the future. "If there is anything positive about the Silver Bridge failure," he concludes, "it is that its legacy should be to remind engineers to proceed always with the utmost caution, ever mindful of the possible existence of unknown unknowns and the potential consequences of even the smallest design decisions."

== In popular culture ==
In his 1970 book Operation Trojan Horse, and in his 1975 book The Mothman Prophecies, Fortean author John Keel linked the Silver Bridge collapse to alleged sightings of the Mothman. The story was adapted as a film by the same name, released in 2002.

Author Jack Matthews wrote a novella, Beyond the Bridge, written as the diary of an imaginary survivor of the disaster starting a new life as a dishwasher in a tiny West Virginia town.

Honky tonk singer-songwriter and West Virginia native Ray Anderson released "The Silver Bridge Disaster" as the A-side of a 1967 single. Also known as Shane’s bridge.

Author James Tynion IV uses both the mothman and the bridge as a plot point in his ongoing comic The Department of Truth.

The Silver Bridge was featured as the pilot episode of Well There's Your Problem, then named Untitled Engineering Disaster Podcast-like content, by Justin Roczniak.

The 2023 video game Trepang2 utilizes the bridge as a small plot point through collectables ingame known as "intel", and the mothman serves as a small antagonist in the same game.

== Silver Memorial Bridge ==
Silver Memorial Bridge
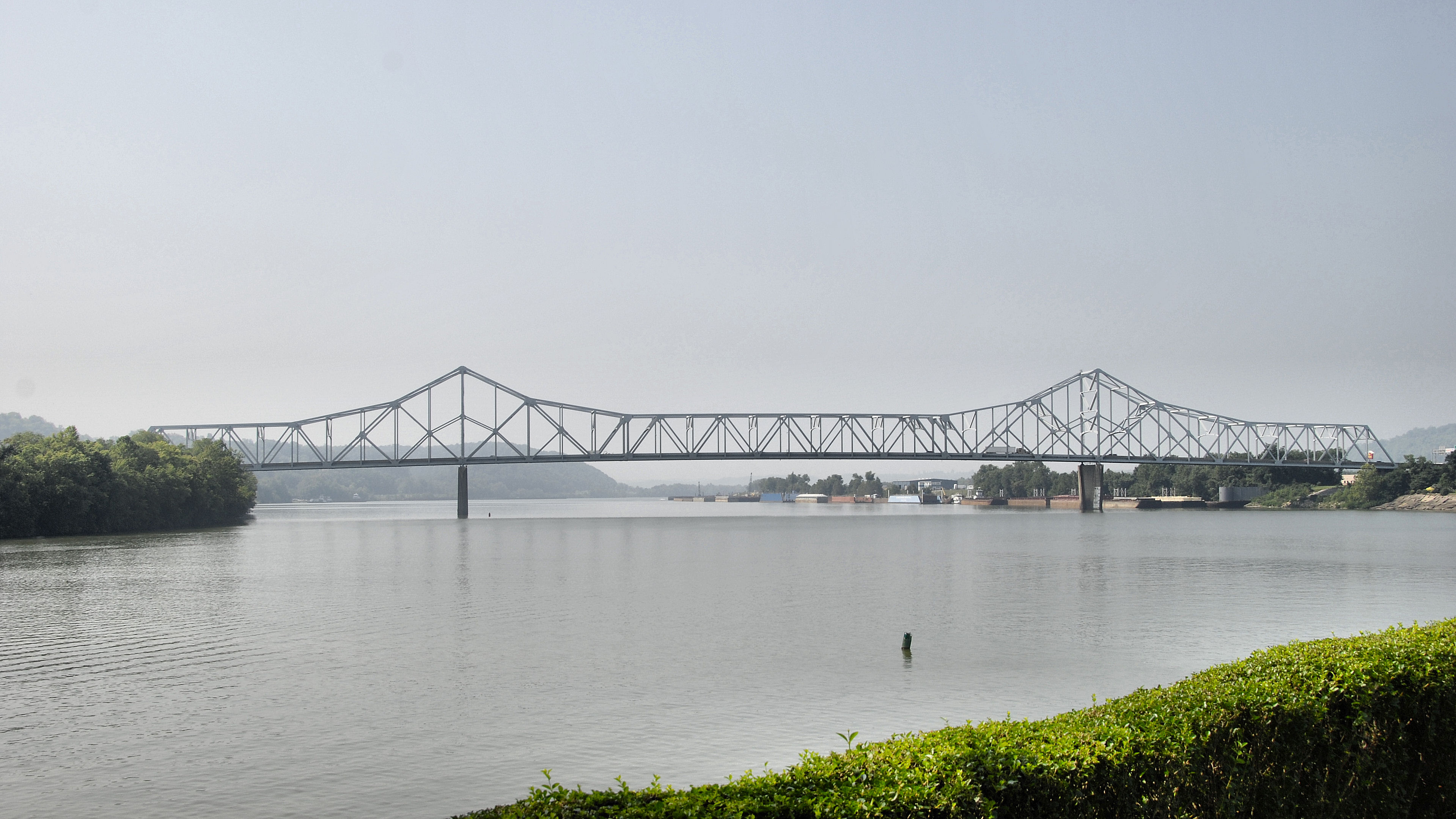
- Coordinates: 38°50′04″N 82°08′51″W
- Carries: 4 lanes of US 35
- Crosses: Ohio River
- Locale: Gallipolis, Ohio to Henderson, West Virginia
- Maintained by: West Virginia Department of Transportation

Characteristics
- Design: cantilever bridge
- Total length: 1,964 feet (599 m)
- Width: 60 feet (18 m)
- Longest span: 900 feet (270 m)
- Clearance below: 69 feet (21 m)

History
- Opened: December 15, 1969

Location
- Interactive map of Silver Memorial Bridge

The Silver Memorial Bridge is a cantilever bridge that spans the Ohio River between Gallipolis, Ohio, and Henderson, West Virginia. Opened in 1969 to replace the collapsed Silver Bridge, it is located about 3/4 mile (1.2 km) downstream (south) of its predecessor.

The bridge, which is not tolled, carries US 35 across the river and serves as a major crossing for people and goods traveling between Charleston, West Virginia, and Southern and Central Ohio. The speed limit on the bridge is 65 miles per hour (105 km/h).

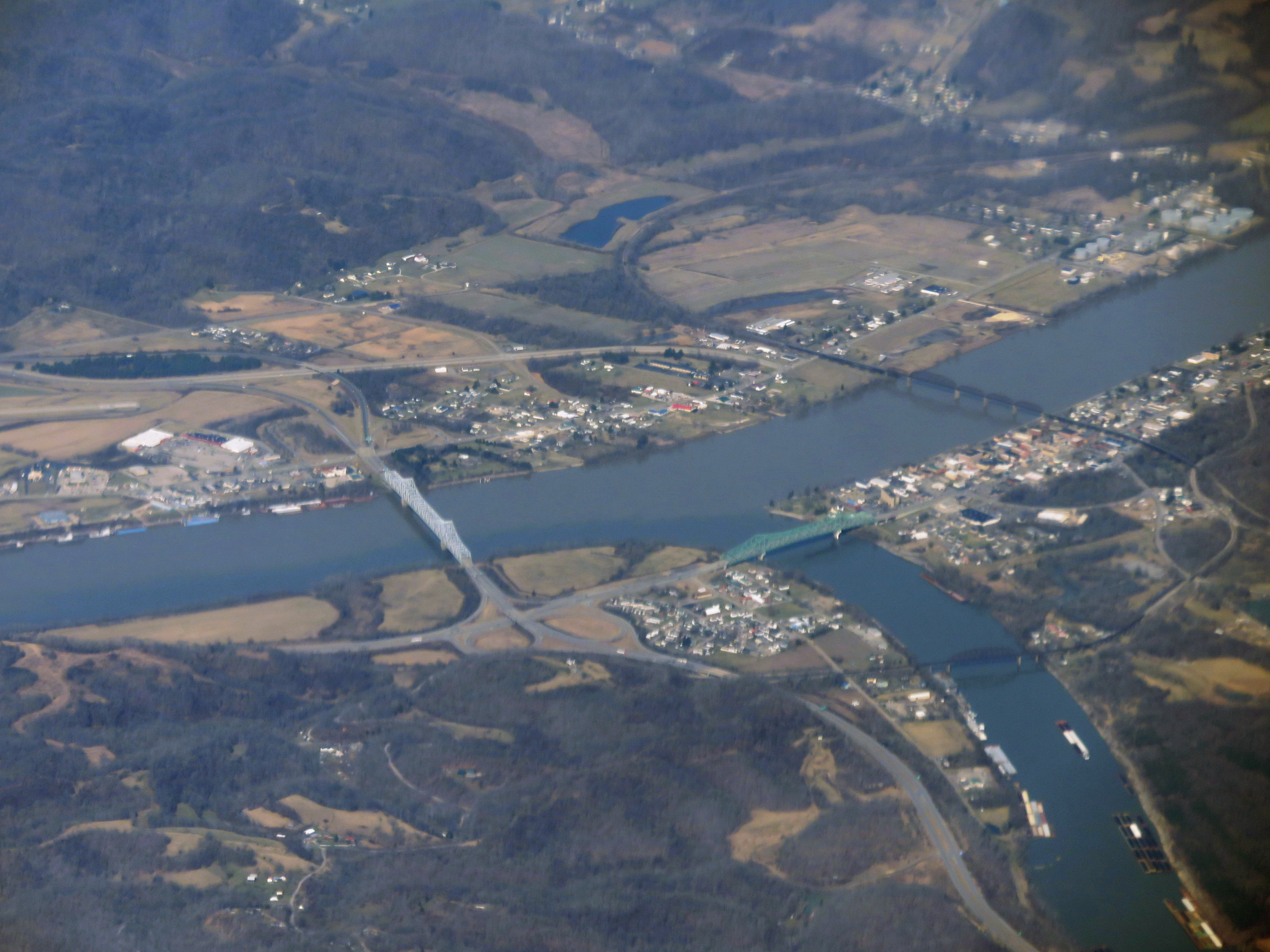
Aerial view of the Silver Memorial Bridge in 2019

== See also ==
- List of crossings of the Ohio River
- List of bridge failures
