= Indrid Cold =

Legendary creature

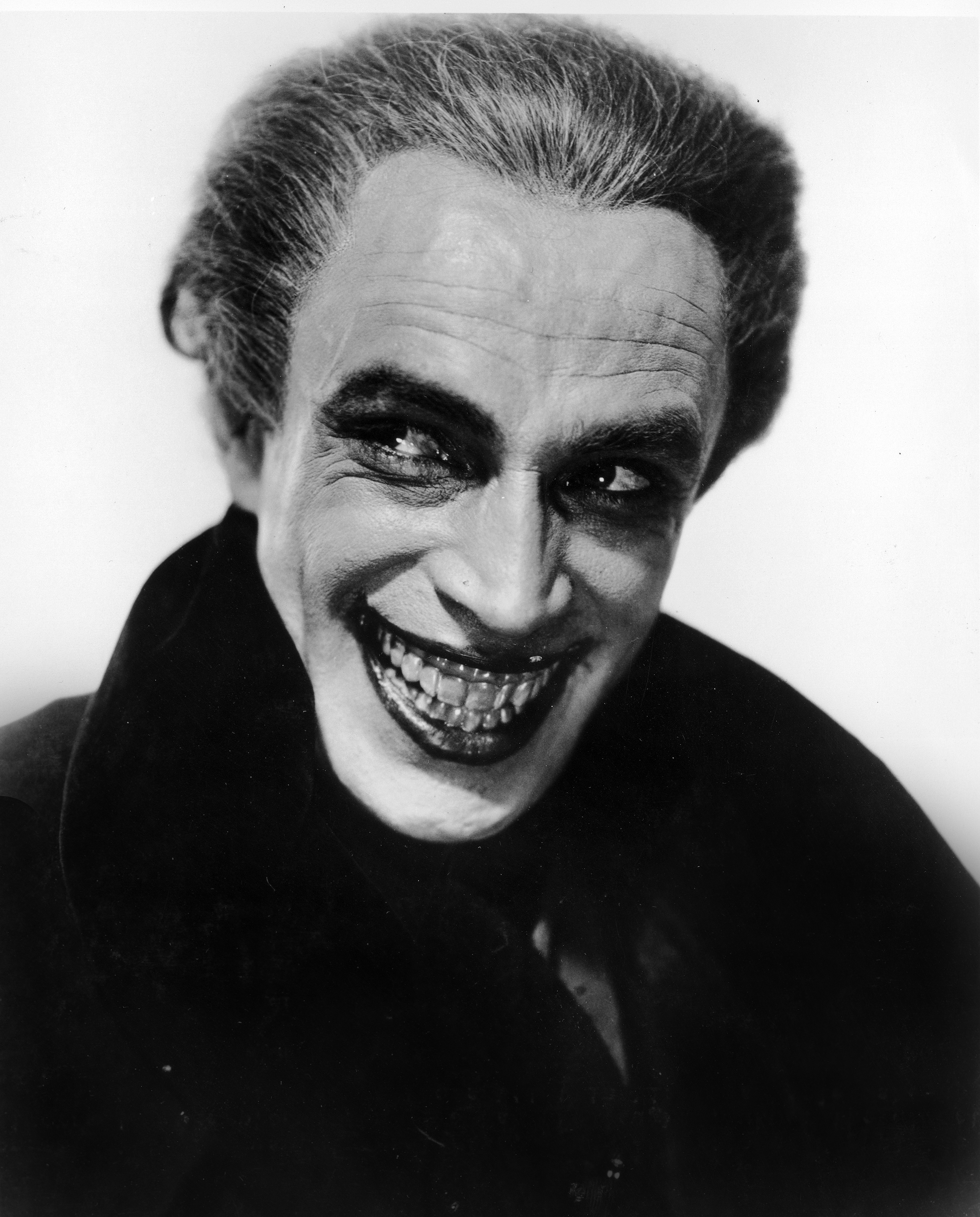
Legends and popular fiction hold that "The Grinning Man" sports an uncanny smile, akin to that depicted in the 1928 film The Man Who Laughs.

Indrid Cold (later known as the Grinning Man or Smiling Man) is a legendary being featured in 21st century popular culture and creepypasta.

"Cold" was initially named by West Virginia "contactee" Woodrow Derenberger at a press conference in November 1966. At the conference, Derenberger claimed Cold was a male humanoid of extraterrestrial origin. In later years, Derenberger claimed to have taken multiple trips to Cold's home planet, reportedly called "Lanulos". Derenberger's story received significant press coverage.

In 1970, Derenberger's tale was further popularized by author John Keel in his book, Strange Creatures From Time And Space. Keel revisited the Cold story in his 1975 book The Mothman Prophecies, which centered on reports of a huge, winged creature known as the Mothman in West Virginia. By 1979, the story of Derenberger riding aboard a spaceship to the planet Lanulus with Cold was being shared by UFO author Gray Barker. While Derenberger had described Cold as a benign Space Brother who offered healing medicine, later depictions cast Cold as more of an ultraterrestrial, sometimes sporting an uncanny, inhumanly-large smile.

In the 21st century, Cold became a trope of horror, featured in the 2002 supernatural horror-mystery film The Mothman Prophecies and a 2016 episode of horror anthology series Scary Endings.

== Woodrow Derenberger's claim ==
"Cold" was initially named by West Virginia "contactee" Woodrow Derenberger at a press conference in November 1966. At the conference, Derenberger described Cold as a male humanoid of extraterrestrial origin. In later years, Derenberger claimed to have taken multiple trips to Cold's home planet, called "Lanulos". Derenberger's story received significant press coverage.

At the conference, Derenberger told press that on the night before, November 2, shortly before 7:30 PM, he had been driving home along Interstate 77 when he saw an unidentified flying object resembling an "old kerosene lamp globe, having a flat bottom and a domelike top", which blocked the road ahead of him and forced him to stop. According to Derenberger, a man he described as six feet tall with an olive complexion, dark brown hair, and wearing a glossy dark blue coat emerged from the object, walked up to his vehicle and spoke to him "telepathically". According to Derenberger, "he had a smile on his face, he appeared very courteous and friendly".

Derenberger said the man identified himself as "Cold" and told him, "Be not frightened" and "Have no fear. We come from a country that is not nearly as powerful as yours. We mean you no harm." According to Derenberger, Cold promised to contact him again and suggested he contact local authorities. In the story, Cold communicated with him for about 10 minutes, after which, Cold returned to the object which rose into the sky and left. Derenberger told press he reported the events to Parkland police after arriving home.

External audio
- Derenberger interview on November 3

Derenberger's story sparked a "media frenzy". The following afternoon at 4 PM, WTAP-TV aired a 30-minute interview with Derenberger. Following the interview, other people claimed to have encountered a man of similar description, and local newspapers ran stories about the mysterious figure for the next three weeks.

Derenberger's account was revisited the following year in the wake of the Michigan "swamp gas" UFO reports. In 1968, Derenberger gave a lecture on his UFO claims in Youngstown. By 1969, Derenberger claimed regular contact with extraterrestrials, saying he personally had flown to their planet twice. By 1970, Derenberger called the being "Indrid Cold". Derenberger appeared on radio to promote his claims in 1971. That year, his claims were the subject of a book by Harold W. Hubbard titled Visitors from Lanulos.

Derenberger died in 1990.

== Popularization by John Keel ==
In 1970, Derenberger's tale was then popularized by Fortean author John Keel in his 1970 Strange Creatures From Time and Space. Keel revisited the Cold story in his 1975 book The Mothman Prophecies, which played a large part in establishing the legend of the Mothman, though reports on the creature had appeared in newspapers almost a decade prior. By 1979, the story of Derenberger riding aboard a spaceship to the planet Lanulus with Cold was being shared by UFO author Gray Barker. While Derenberger had described Cold as a benign Space Brother who offered healing medicine, later depictions cast Cold as a more creepy ultraterrestrial, sometimes sporting an uncanny, inhumanly-large smile.

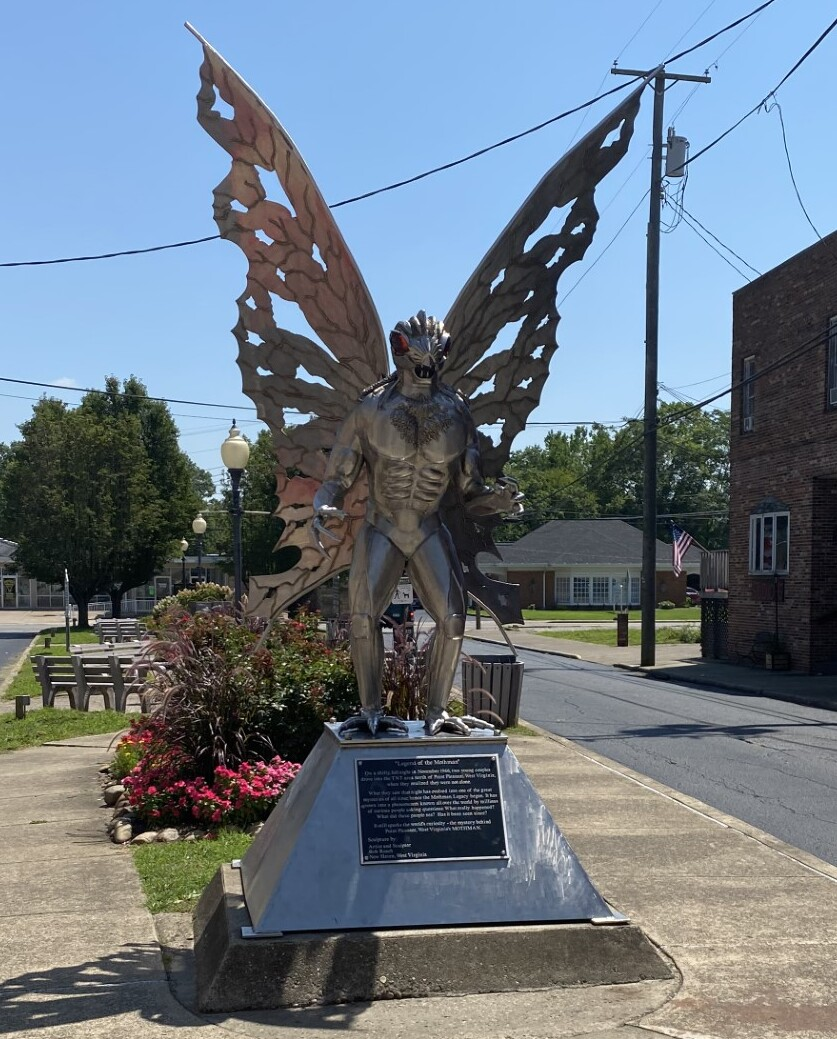
Mothman statue located in Point Pleasant, West Virginia

Indrid Cold was popularized by John Keel in his 1970 book, Strange Creatures From Time And Space, which devotes a chapter to the entity Keel called "the Grinning Man". According to Keel, on October 11, 1966, two boys in Elizabeth, New Jersey reported seeing "the strangest guy we ever saw", a very tall man in reflective green coveralls who was standing behind a wire fence in a location the boys believed to be inaccessible. Keel relates that the man looked at the boys and grinned. Keel suggested the Derenberger's gently-smiling extraterrestrial and the boys' grinning stranger were the same entity. Keel also relayed that Derenberger had supplied a full name for his extraterrestrial contact: "Indrid Cold".

== Reception ==
While Keel's account suggested that both the boys and Derenberger encountered beings with exaggerated grins, Brian Dunning notes that Derenberger's story never specified any unusual grin. According to folklorist David Clarke, Keel's own distinction "between fact and fiction was a very fine one". In his 1975 follow-up The Mothman Prophecies, Keel suggested Cold was linked to Mothman reports in Point Pleasant which began on November 15, 1966, thirteen days after Derenberger's press conference.

In the May/June 2002 issue of Skeptical Inquirer, journalist John C. Sherwood, a former business associate of UFO researcher Gray Barker, published an analysis of private letters between Keel and Barker during the period of Keel's investigation. In the article, "Gray Barker's Book of Bunk", Sherwood reported finding significant differences between what Keel wrote at the time of his investigation and what he wrote in his first book about the Mothman reports, an observation which raised questions about the book's accuracy. Sherwood also reported that Keel, who was well known for writing humorous and outrageous letters to friends and associates, would not assist him in clarifying the differences.

== In popular culture ==
- In "Jose Chung's From Outer Space", an episode of The X-Files, a motorist with a fantasy prone personality relays a tale of a highway meeting with an alien named "Lord Kinbote" who spoke in archaic English and advised the man to "be not afraid". The Lord Kinbote character may have had less to do with Indrid Cold, specifically, than more a generalized representative of many UFO entity encounters; the Kinbote name refers to the fabulist main character of the novel Pale Fire.
- Indrid Cold appeared as a character in the 2002 film The Mothman Prophecies, loosely inspired by Keel's nonfiction book. Among other changes, the film takes place in the 2000s, rather than the 1960s. Cold was played by actor Bill Laing.
- In a 2016 episode of anthology series Scary Endings, actor Grant Geller played Cold.
- In the 2018 actual play supernatural horror podcast The Adventure Zone: Amnesty, Indrid Cold is the human disguise of the Mothman, who uses their precognitive powers to bewilder and assist the main characters. He is an NPC played by Griffin McElroy, and later appears as a player character in The Adventure Zone: Dust.
- Indrid appears as a random encounter in the 2018 video game Fallout 76, as does the Mothman. Indrid was added to the game in a 2023 update.
- The second season of Hellier, released in 2019, features an alleged modern contactee claiming to have contact with Cold.

== See also ==
- Eagle River encounter, where men in an unidentified aircraft allegedly took water and gave pancakes
- Men in black
