= Hellier (TV series) =

- Genre: Paranormal, Documentary
- Directed by: Karl Pfeiffer
- Theme music composer: Connor James Randall
- Country of origin: United States
- Original language: English
- No. of seasons: 2
- No. of episodes: 15

Production
- Executive producers: Greg Newkirk, Dana Newkirk
- Production location: Kentucky
- Cinematography: Rashad Sisemore
- Running time: 38-77 minutes
- Production company: Planet Weird

Original release
- Release: January 18, 2019

Hellier is a digital documentary series directed by Karl Pfeiffer, under the banner of Planet Weird, that aims to explore a string of synchronicities that take place in Hellier, Kentucky. The first season, which consisted of five episodes, was released for free on January 18, 2019, on YouTube and other platforms on a pay-what-you-want model. The second season, which consisted of ten episodes, was released first on Amazon Prime Video on November 29, 2019, and later on YouTube on December 13, 2019.

== Season one ==
A team of paranormal investigators received a report related to the Kelly–Hopkinsville encounter, taking place in 1955. After a series of emails exchanged with an alleged doctor, "David", the team traveled to Hellier, Kentucky to investigate. They found that no one in Hellier had heard of the doctor, and records showed that he did not exist. They also began receiving messages from a mysterious "Terry Wriste" who goaded them to investigate further.

Title	Length
The Midnight Children	1:01:58
Ink and Black	57:45
Trapped in a Maze	51:59
Slivers of the Future	49:54
The Heart of It	1:04:37

=== Season two ===
The second season focuses its investigation on the identity of Terry Wriste and other paranormal events that took place in Kentucky. They meet a woman who claims to have contact with "Indrid Cold", a paranormal entity which has first appeared in the 1960s and a connection to the more well-known Mothman. They meet with paranormal author Allen Greenfield. The team travels to Somerset, Kentucky and visited the International Paranormal Museum and Research Center, and talked with its owner Kyle Kadel. They donated some items to the museum, including a lantern used on ghost hunts in season 1.

Title	Length
Noise and Signal	45:00
And the Dead	43:58
Borderlands	37:45
Your Green Man	42:27
The Unknown Country	46:26
The Altar	50:28
The Trickster	46:54
The Secret Commonwealth	48:38
The Center of Your Mind	56:52
Night of Pan	1:11:03

== Season three ==
As of September 6, 2023, a third season was confirmed to be in production and that filming had already begun.

== Reception ==
The first season of Hellier was released to positive reviews and viewed by over a million people. The second season had a more mixed response, with critics finding the story to be confusing; however, the cinematography was still almost universally praised.

== In popular media ==
- Hellier has been mentioned several times on The Last Podcast on the Left, with a full review being done on the February 6, 2019 episode, Side Stories: Metal Health.
- The first and second season of Hellier was covered in an interview format on the Mysterious Universe podcast.
