= Vern Bickford =

American baseball player (1920–1960)

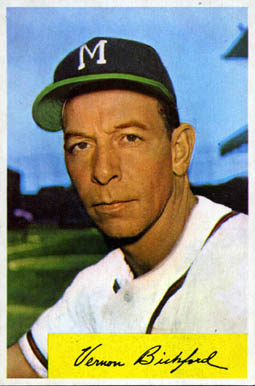
- Bickford in 1954
- Pitcher
- Born: August 17, 1920; Hellier, Kentucky, U.S.
- Died: May 6, 1960 (aged 39); Richmond, Virginia, U.S.
- Batted: Right Threw: Right

MLB debut
- April 24, 1948, for the Boston Braves

Last MLB appearance
- April 24, 1954, for the Baltimore Orioles

MLB statistics
- Win–loss record: 66–57
- Earned run average: 3.71
- Strikeouts: 450
- Stats at Baseball Reference

Teams
- Boston / Milwaukee Braves (1948–1953); Baltimore Orioles (1954)

Career highlights and awards
- All Star (1949); Pitched a no-hitter on August 11, 1950

Vernon Edgell Bickford (August 17, 1920 – May 6, 1960) was an American professional baseball player. A right-handed starting pitcher, he played six seasons in Major League Baseball (MLB) for the Boston/Milwaukee Braves from 1948 to 1953 in the National League, and one game for the Baltimore Orioles of the American League in 1954.

Bickford was born in Kentucky but raised in West Virginia. He began his professional career in 1939 and, after serving in World War II, made the majors in 1949. Acquired by the Braves organization due to a flip of a coin, Bickford became one of the most promising National League pitchers during his playing career, earning All-Star honors in 1949 and leading the National League in complete games in 1950. However his career was soon shorted by multiple arm injuries, and he was out of baseball by 1955. After working an assortment of jobs, he was diagnosed with stomach cancer in 1960 and died after a three-month illness.

He is best known for throwing a no-hitter against the Brooklyn Dodgers on August 11, 1950. Although the slogan "Spahn and Sain, then two days of rain" is today widely mentioned when reference is made to the Braves' 1948 season, at the time it was actually, "Bickford, Spahn and Sain and then we pray for rain." His winning percentage of .688 that year, his rookie season, in which he did not really begin to pitch until well into the season, was higher than either that of Sain or Spahn.

== Early life ==
Bickford was born in Hellier, Kentucky and raised in Berwind, West Virginia. He began playing semi-professional baseball in 1939 for a local West Virginian team, before signing with the Welch Minors of the Class-D Mountain State League the same year. He served three years in the armed forces during World War II where he later claimed "helped" improve his career, as he got pitching tips from several professional Major League ballplayers.

== Minor league career ==
Bickford was groomed to be a relief pitcher in minor league baseball and played four seasons with the Welch Minors before going off to fight in World War II. He came back to the Braves system in 1946 where he played for the Jackson Senators of the Southeastern League, where he had a 10–12 win–loss record with a 3.33 earned run average (ERA), and one game with the Hartford Chiefs of the Eastern League.

He was promoted to the Indianapolis Indians of the American Association for the 1947 campaign when Indianapolis owner Frank McKinney bought controlling interest in the Pittsburgh Pirates organization. Allegedly, Bickford stayed as part of the Braves organization due to a flip of a coin at a local bar. An argument endured between McKinney, Braves president Lou Perini and Braves general manager John Quinn during spring training over the fate of the players in the organization, with McKinney wanting to move Indianapolis and all its players to the Pirates organization. Via a gentleman's agreement, they decided to split the players with a flip of a coin. They flipped a coin for the first selection, similar to a sports draft. If the coin landed heads, the player was headed to the Pirates organization and if it landed tails they stayed in Braves organization. The coin landed on tails, and the Braves picked Bickford and took over his contract. Perini later recalled on why he selected Bickford. Brooklyn's general manager Branch Rickey had interest in the young right-hander, and Perini thought that "if Bickford was good enough for Rickey, he was good enough for the Braves". Bickford played for the Milwaukee Brewers in 1947, where he had a 9–5 win–loss record with a 3.78 earned run average in 29 games, 14 of which were starts.

== Major League career ==
Bickford was expected to start the 1948 season in the minor leagues due to lack of control. However, a friend of Boston Braves manager Billy Southworth stated that Bickford was likely better as a starting pitcher and reached the major league roster. His Major League debut was on April 24, 1948, in a 16–9 loss against the New York Giants. He entered in relief at the top of the fourth inning, after Al Lyons gave up three earned runs to start the inning. He got Sid Gordon to hit to a double play and after giving up a single to Johnny Mize, he retired Willard Marshall on a grounder to end the inning. He made his first career start against the Pirates, a 4–1 victory on May 19 in which he only gave up five hits. On June 7, he pitched a four-hitter in an 11–1 victory over the Chicago Cubs, throwing five perfect innings before giving up a hit to Dick Culler to start the sixth inning. He finished with an 11–5 mark and a 3.27 earned run average as the Braves won the National League pennant and advanced to the 1948 World Series against the Cleveland Indians. In his only World Series appearance, he started Game 3, where he gave up one run on four hits in 3.1 innings pitched and was charged with the loss.

=== 1949–50 ===
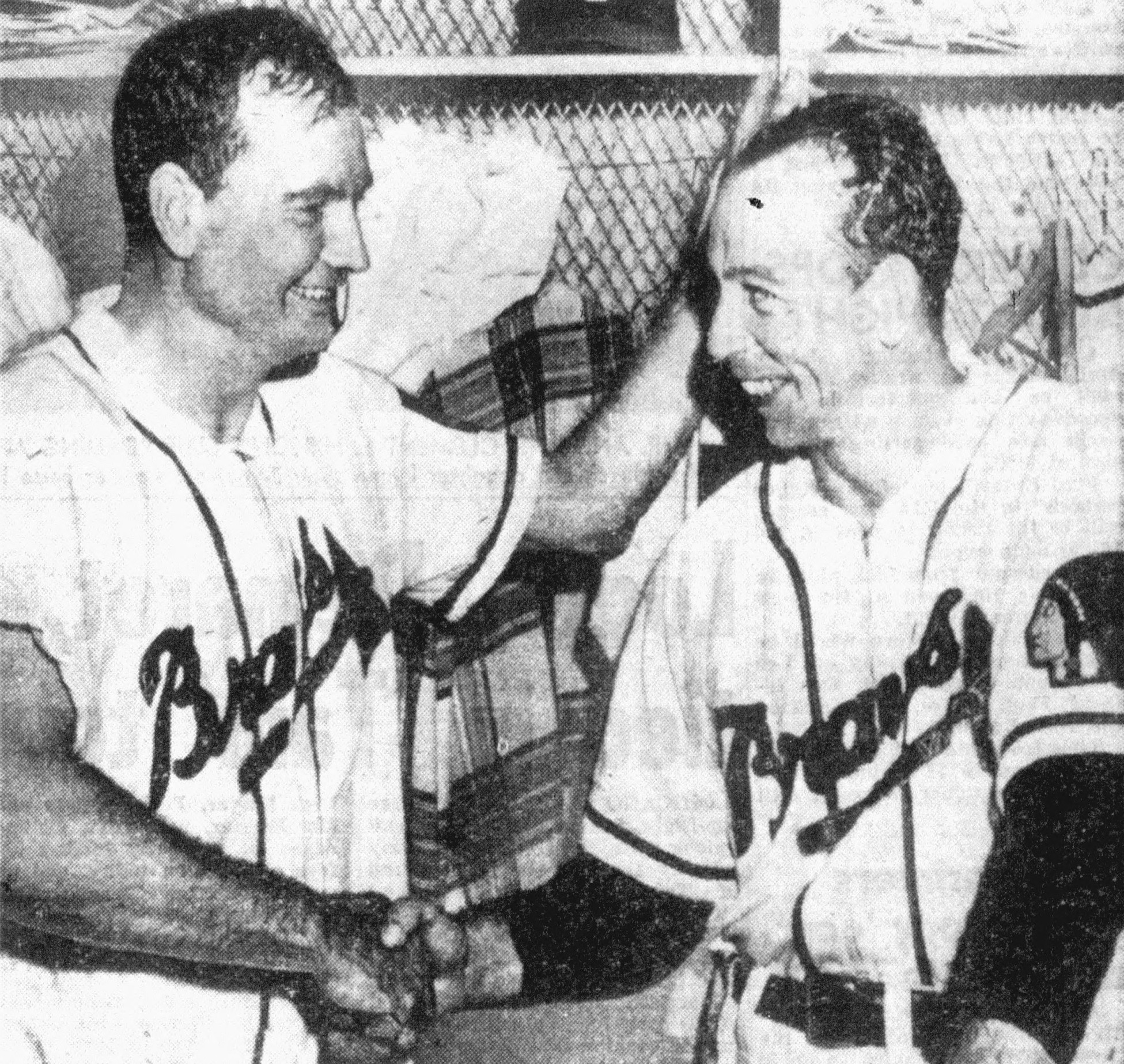
Boston Braves catcher Walker Cooper (left) congratulates his battery mate Bickford (right) following his no-hitter on August 11, 1950, against the Brooklyn Dodgers.

In 1949, Bickford went 16–11 with a 4.25 earned run average and made the National League All-Star team. He finished seventh in the league in complete games (15) and third in games started (36) behind teammate Warren Spahn and Ken Raffensberger of the Cincinnati Reds. He lost a no-hitter in the ninth inning in one of those games. At season's end Bickford, alongside Spahn and teammate Johnny Sain created one of the most formidable pitching trios in the league for the next several years.

His best season statistical-wise came in 1950, when he went 19–14 with a 3.47 earned run average and led the National League in games started (39), complete games (27), innings pitched (311.2) and batters faced (1,325). He also finished eighth in the league with 126 strikeouts. The high point of his career was his 7–0 no-hitter against the Brooklyn Dodgers on August 11, the first no-hitter in the Major Leagues since Rex Barney threw one for Brooklyn in 1948, and the first one for the Braves since Jim Tobin in 1944. He retired the first 10 batters before walking Gene Hermanski in the fourth inning. Overall, he walked four batters, and Duke Snider hit into a double play to end the game. Afterwards, Bickford stated that "all he wanted was the game". His no-hitter helped stay the Braves in the pennant race, falling five games behind the Philadelphia Phillies. However the Braves faltered and finished fourth with an 83–79 record, eight games behind the Phillies in the standings. Bickford struggled near the end of the year, falling short in his six games in an attempt to record a 20-win season.

=== Later career ===
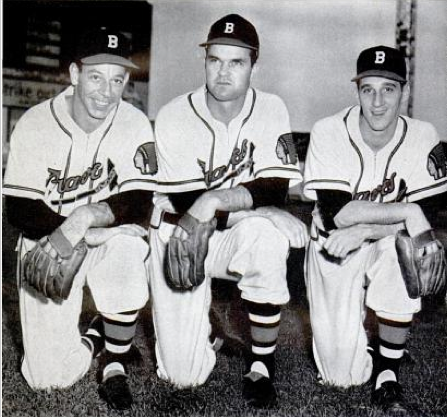
Bickford (left) with Johnny Sain and Warren Spahn in 1951.

In 1951, he had an 11–9 win–loss record with a career low 3.12 earned run average in 25 games. His 3.12 earned run average was good for eighth in the league. However, Bickford broke a finger in 1951 after being hit by a line drive, missed most of the final three months of the season and never regained his prior form. In 1952, he was 7–12 with a 3.74 earned run average in 26 games, 22 of them starts. He played for the Braves when the team moved to Milwaukee before the 1953 season; however, he suffered from bone spurs in his pitching arm. During the 1953 season, Bickford had a 2–5 win–loss record with a 5.28 earned run average.

In 1954, Bickford was sold to the Baltimore Orioles for an undisclosed amount of cash and catcher Charlie White. The New York Yankees and the Boston Red Sox were both interested in Bickford's services, but general manager John Quinn decided to go with Baltimore's offer. He only played one game, a start against the Chicago White Sox on April 24. He gave up five runs, four of them earned, in four innings before being credited with the 14–4 loss. A pinched nerve in his throwing arm and eventual elbow surgery shortened his career. In 1955, he unsuccessfully tried a brief comeback with the Triple-A Richmond Virginians in the International League. He pitched in nine games before retiring due to complications of his arm injuries.

== Personal life and death ==
Following his playing career, Bickford worked an assortment of jobs, as an automobile dealer, a traveling salesman and a carpenter. He spent the last few months of his life hospitalized from cancer, dropping 65 pounds, and telling the media a few days before his death about beating the cancer in order to coach professional baseball. He died of cancer in Maguire Veterans Hospital in Richmond, Virginia, at the age of 39. He left behind a wife and three sons at the time of his death. He is buried at Mount Zion Baptist Church Cemetery in New Canton, Virginia.

== See also ==
- List of Major League Baseball no-hitters

Preceded by Rex Barney	No-hitter pitcher August 11, 1950	Succeeded by Cliff Chambers
