= The Mothman Prophecies (film) =

2002 film by Mark Pellington

- Theatrical release poster
- Directed by: Mark Pellington
- Screenplay by: Richard Hatem
- Based on: The Mothman Prophecies by John Keel
- Produced by: Gary W. Goldstein; Gary Lucchesi; Tom Rosenberg
- Starring: Richard Gere; Laura Linney; Will Patton; Debra Messing; Lucinda Jenney; Alan Bates
- Cinematography: Fred Murphy
- Edited by: Brian Berdan
- Music by: Tomandandy
- Production companies: Screen Gems; Lakeshore Entertainment
- Distributed by: Sony Pictures Releasing (select territories); Lakeshore Entertainment (International)
- Release date: January 25, 2002
- Running time: 119 minutes
- Country: United States
- Language: English
- Budget: $32 million
- Box office: $55.2 million

The Mothman Prophecies is a 2002 American supernatural horror film directed by Mark Pellington, and starring Richard Gere and Laura Linney, with Will Patton, Debra Messing, Alan Bates, and Lucinda Jenney in supporting roles. Based on the 1975 book of the same name by parapsychologist and Fortean author John Keel, the screenplay was written by Richard Hatem.

The story follows John Klein (Gere), a reporter who researches the legend of the Mothman. Still shaken by the death of his wife two years earlier from a glioblastoma, John is sent to cover a news piece and inexplicably finds himself in Point Pleasant, West Virginia, where there have been sightings of an unusual creature and other unexplained phenomena. As he becomes increasingly drawn into mysterious forces at work, he hopes they can reconnect him to his wife, while the local sheriff (Linney) becomes concerned about his obsessions.

The film claims to be based on actual events that occurred between November 1966 and December 1967 in Point Pleasant, as described by Keel. It was shot in Pittsburgh and Kittanning, Pennsylvania, and was released to mixed reviews, although it was a box office success and has since gained a cult following.

== Plot ==
Washington Post columnist John Klein and his wife Mary are involved in a car accident when Mary swerves to avoid a huge, flying, black figure that only she witnesses. John survives the crash unscathed, but Mary is hospitalized. There she is diagnosed with an unrelated brain tumor and dies shortly thereafter. John discovers her sketchbook of terrifying drawings of a "mothlike" creature with red eyes that she drew over and over while hospitalized.

Two years later, while driving in the middle of the night to Richmond, Virginia, from Washington, D.C., John's car breaks down, and he walks to a nearby house to get help. The owner, Gordon Smallwood, reacts violently to John's appearance and holds him at gunpoint. Local sheriff Connie Mills defuses the situation while Gordon claims that this is the third consecutive night when John has knocked on his door at 2:30 a.m. asking to use the phone. Connie and John try to make sense of these events. John checks in at a local motel and discovers that he is in Point Pleasant, West Virginia, just across the state line of Ohio, hundreds of miles off his route and having travelled the distance impossibly fast. He ponders how he ended up so far from his original destination.

Connie discloses to John that many strange things have been occurring in the past few weeks and that people have reported seeing a large winged creature like a giant moth with red eyes, with some witnesses making drawings of the creature similar to Mary's. She also tells him about a strange dream that she had, in which the words, "Wake up, Number 37", were spoken to her as she drifts in open water. During a conversation with Gordon, he reveals to John that he has heard voices coming from his sink, telling him that, in Denver, "99 will die." While discussing the day's events at a local diner, John notices that the news is showing the story of an airliner crash in Denver that killed all 99 passengers and crew aboard.

The next night Gordon frantically explains that the voices in his head emanate from a being named Indrid Cold. Later on, Gordon calls John on the phone and says that he is standing next to Indrid Cold. While John keeps Cold on the line, Connie checks on Gordon. Cold gives John details about his life that only he knows and John tests Cold with questions that only someone in the same room could answer correctly, which Cold does. John is convinced that Cold is a supernatural being. Meanwhile, Connie hammers on Gordon's door. Gordon answers sleepily and says that he has been in bed for hours.

This particular event escalates a string of supernatural calls to John's motel room from Cold. One tells him that there will be a great tragedy on the Ohio River. Later, John receives a cryptic call from Gordon and rushes to his home to check on him. He finds Gordon outside, dead from exposure, though the police estimate that he died hours before he called John.

John becomes obsessed with the local "Mothman" legend as some of the messages and apparitions imitate Mary, and he arranges to meet an expert on the subject, Alexander Leek. Leek explains its enigmatic nature and discourages John from becoming further involved, warning him that attempting to prevent predicted events is futile. However, when John learns that the governor plans to tour a chemical plant located on the Ohio River the following day, he becomes convinced that the tragedy will occur there. Connie and the governor ignore his warnings, and nothing happens during the tour.

Soon after, John receives a mysterious letter that instructs him to await a call from Mary back in Georgetown on Christmas Eve at noon. He returns home to wait for her call. On Christmas Eve, Connie calls John to convince him to ignore the phone call from "Mary", return to Point Pleasant, and join her and her family for Christmas Eve dinner. John realizes his obsession is isolating him, and decides to return to Point Pleasant to spend the holiday with Connie.

As John reaches the Silver Bridge, malfunctioning traffic lights cause traffic congestion on the bridge. Hearing the bolts and supports of the overloaded bridge straining, John realizes that the prophesied tragedy on the Ohio River was about the bridge, not the chemical plant. The bridge comes apart, and, as it collapses, Connie's police car falls into the water. John jumps in after her and pulls her from the river to safety. As the two sit in the back of an ambulance, they are informed that 36 people have been killed. That makes Connie the "number 37" from her dream.

The film ends with a claim that the cause of the bridge collapse was never fully determined, and that although Mothman has been sighted in other parts of the world, it was never seen again in Point Pleasant.

== Cast ==
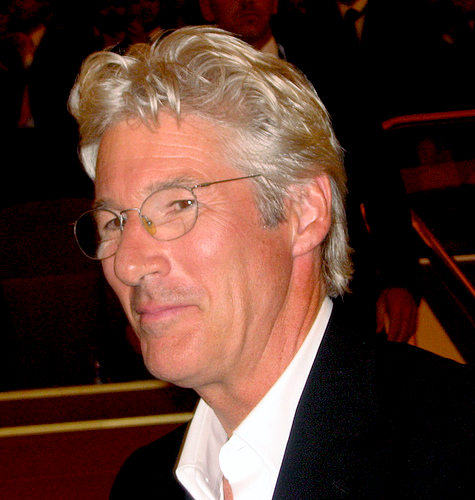
Leading actor Richard Gere, who portrayed the protagonist John Klein

- Richard Gere as John Klein
- Laura Linney as Connie Mills
- Will Patton as Gordon Smallwood
- Debra Messing as Mary Klein
- Lucinda Jenney as Denise Smallwood
- Alan Bates as Alexander Leek
- David Eigenberg as Ed Fleischman
- Bob Tracey as Cyrus Bills
- Bill Laing as Indrid Cold
- Mark Pellington as Bartender / Indrid Cold (voice)

== Themes and interpretations ==
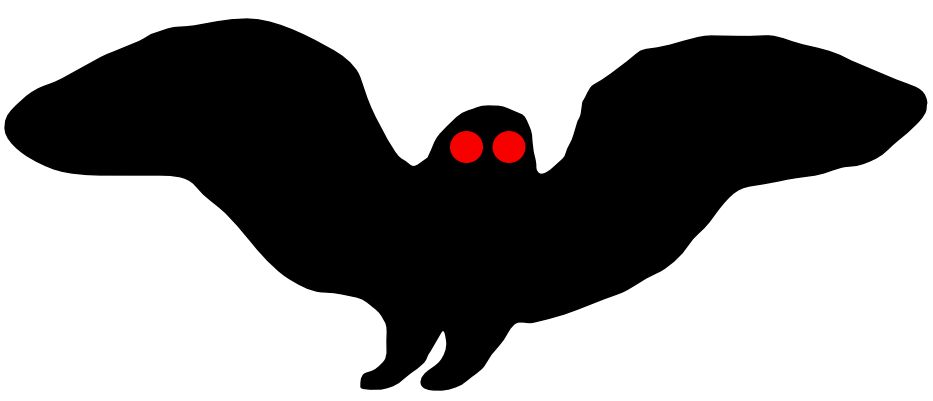
Film critics have interpreted the film's portrayal of Mothman as demonic.

Writer Paul Meehan judged the film's explanation of the Mothman to be a "confused mish-mosh of science fiction and demonology" and likened it to the television series The X-Files, though preserving Keel's "breathless hysteria". Meehan remarked that "Aliens spouting prophetic utterances are rare in UFO literature."

In contrast to Meehan, author Jason Horsley declared The Mothman Prophecies "probably the most effective depiction of demonic forces at work" in U.S. cinema. Horsley assessed its approach to the Mothman legend as depicting a "schizophrenic nature of reality", fulfilling a "revelation" purpose in horror film, as it "strips away the comfortable veneer of consensus reality to reveal the seething abyss of irrationality." Horsley argued the film's Mothman arrives from a foreign dimension, but being without "physical existence", it is also a product of the minds of Point Pleasant's citizens, based on "formless and impersonal energy". The Mothman, identified by Horsley as "emissary of the Id", is depicted in the film as being as natural as electricity.

== Production ==
Carl Franklin was originally attached to direct Richard Hatem's spec script before Mark Pellington was hired. Pellington rejected numerous screenplay drafts as literal interpretations of Keel's book, and wished to explore psychological drama in UFO witnesses.

In reality, 46 people died in the collapse of the Silver Bridge, not 36 as depicted in the film. The motion picture's claim at the end credits of the collapse of the Silver Bridge never being explained is false; the incident was found to be caused by the failure of an eye-bar in a suspension chain in 1971, well before the publication of the book on which the film is based, let alone the film.

=== Filming ===
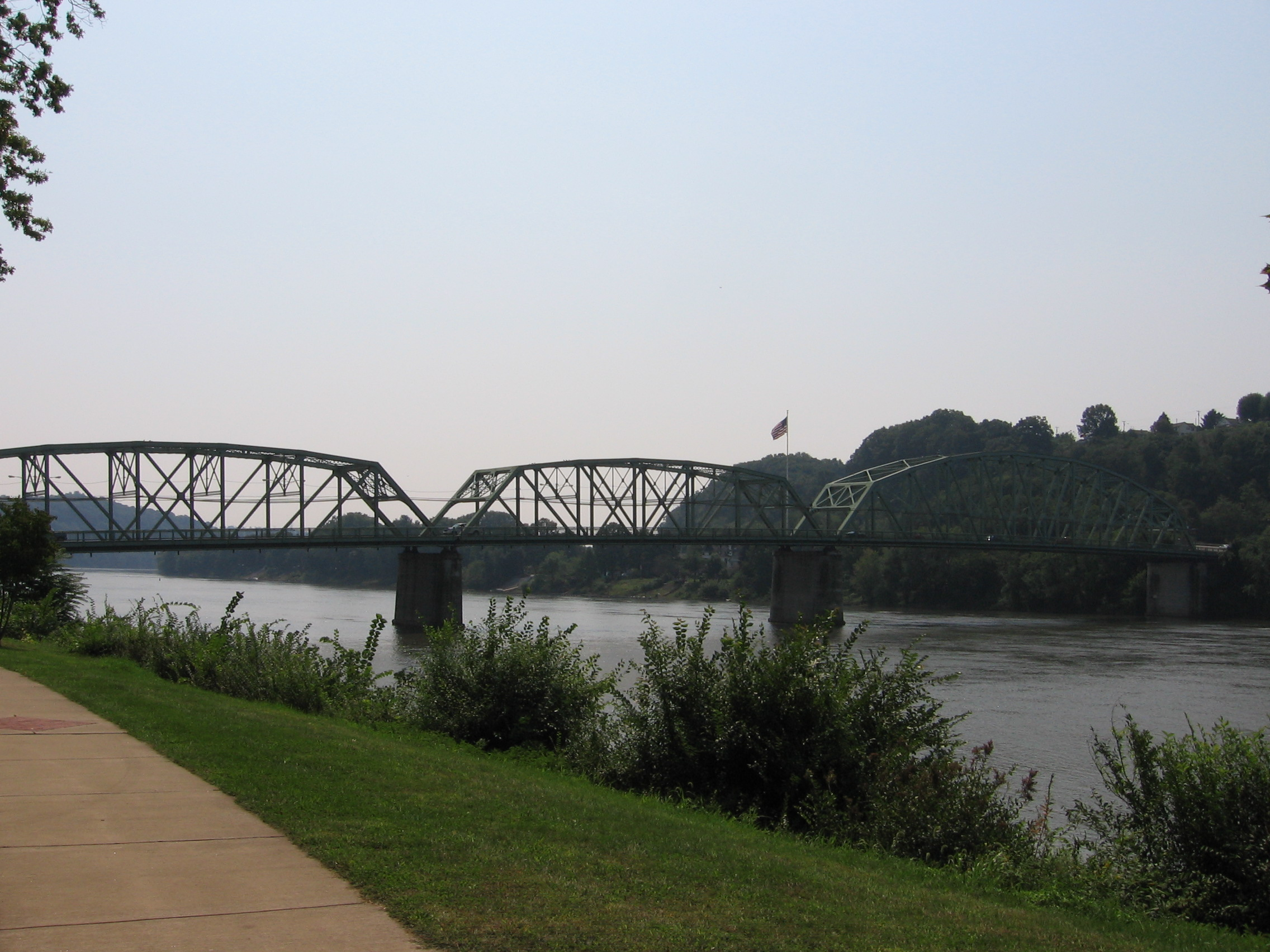
Kittanning Citizens Bridge

Aside from a few opening scenes filmed in Washington, D.C., most of the motion picture was filmed in the areas of Pittsburgh and Kittanning in Pennsylvania. The scenes of Gere sitting on a park bench are on the University of Pittsburgh campus. Road montages were filmed on Pennsylvania Route 28, and the Chicago scenes are completely shot in downtown Pittsburgh’s Mellon Square and Trinity Cathedral environs as well as the entrance to the Duquesne Club. The "Chemical Plant" featured in the movie is actually a power station owned by Reliant Energy in Elrama, Pennsylvania. The Avalon Motor Inn is in Eighty Four, Pennsylvania, though scenes set indoors were built as separate sets, as the inn's atmosphere could not accommodate production. Point Pleasant scenes were shot in Kittanning. The hospital scenes were filmed at St. Frances Medical Center which is now the site of Children's Hospital of Pittsburgh.

The collapse of the Silver Bridge was actually filmed at the Kittanning Citizens Bridge in downtown Kittanning. Scenes shot at Gordon Smallwood’s house were filmed in Washington County on Pennsylvania Route 917. Allegheny County Airport, in the Pittsburgh suburb of West Mifflin, serves as backdrop for the airfield scenes. Despite this relocation, several police officers from Point Pleasant appeared as extras.

=== Music ===
The film's musical score was composed by the creative lab Tomandandy. On January 22, 2002. Lakeshore Records released a two-disc edition of the soundtrack.

The Mothman Prophecies: Music from the Motion Picture (Disc 1)

Film score by various artists
- Released: January 22, 2002
- Length: 44:05
- Label: Lakeshore Records
- Producers: Cliff Eidelman tomandandy

The Mothman Prophecies: Music from the Motion Picture (Disc 1)
No.	Title	Length
1.	"Half Light (single) (Low with tomandandy)"	4:23
2.	"Wake Up #37 (King Black Acid)"	5:37
3.	"Haunted (King Black Acid)"	5:03
4.	"One and Only (King Black Acid)"	1:59
5.	"Collage (Glenn Branca)"	1:05
6.	"Great Spaces (King Black Acid)"	5:19
7.	"Rolling Under (King Black Acid)"	5:26
8.	"Half Life (King Black Acid)"	4:13
9.	"Soul Systems Burn (King Black Acid)"	5:35
10.	"Half Light (tail credit) (Low with tomandandy)"	6:46
Total length:		44:05

The Mothman Prophecies: Music from the Motion Picture (Disc 2)

Film score by tomandandy
- Released: January 22, 2002
- Length: 58:03
- Label: Lakeshore Records

The Mothman Prophecies: Music from the Motion Picture (Disc 2)
No.	Title	Length
1.	"Movement 1: Composed of 12 Members/ Retrace/ A New Home/ MRI/ Welcome To Point Pleasant"	8:05
2.	"Movement 2: Point Pleasant/ Seeing Strange Things/ It's a Voice and It's Saying, Do Not Be Afraid/ He's Wrong/ Denver 9"	7:32
3.	"Movement 3: I Had a Dream Like That/ Not From Human Vocal Chords/ Zone Of Fear/ Ring Ring/ Leek/ Leek Wouldn't See Me"	9:53
4.	"Movement 4: All At Once, I Understand, Everything/ Do You Know That Woman?/ The Tape Reveals/ We Are Not Allowed To Know"	7:36
5.	"Movement 5: It's How I Ended Up Here/ Airport/ I Have To Go"	4:25
6.	"Movement 6: We Have Dinner At 6, And We Open Presents At 8/ 12:00 Call"	3:51
7.	"Movement 7: The Bridge"	8:21
8.	"Movement 8: Mirror Drone/ John's Theme/ Cellos"	9:40
Total length:		58:03

== Release ==
After the film was theatrically released on January 25, 2002, writer Brad Steiger observed Point Pleasant became a focal point for its promotion. Marketing in television and posters emphasized claims it was "based on true events", despite the supernatural premise and Pellington's acknowledgement that the account was reframed as a fictional narrative.

On June 4, 2002, a Region 1 edition of the motion picture was released on DVD. Special features included audio commentary by Pellington, a documentary titled Search for the Mothman, and the featurette "Day by Day: A Director's Journey – The Road In". In Region 2, a DVD was published also including Search for the Mothman as well as interviews with Gere, Linney and Patton.

== Reception ==
=== Critical response ===
Among mainstream critics in the U.S., the film received mixed reviews. Rotten Tomatoes reported that 52% of 140 sampled critics gave the film a positive review, with an average score of 5.50/10. The site's consensus simply labels it "A creepy thriller that poses more questions than it answers". At Metacritic, which assigns a weighted average out of 100 to critics' reviews, The Mothman Prophecies received a score of 52 based on 32 reviews. Audiences polled by CinemaScore gave the film an average grade of "C+" on an A+ to F scale.

Roger Ebert of the Chicago Sun-Times gave it two stars out of four, calling it unfocused, but praised the direction by Mark Pellington "whose command of camera, pacing and the overall effect is so good, it deserves a better screenplay." The New York Times critic Elvis Mitchell judged it "hushed and smooth" but "little more than an adequate shard of winter-doldrums genre fare". The Washington Post's Stephen Hunter dismissed it as "all buzz: It's camerawork on the verge of a meltdown and weird music in search of a composer", and joked seeing it "is like getting mugged in an alley by an especially thuggish crew of Method actors". In Variety, Robert Koehler claimed it "wanders away from its sustained atmospherics into silly expository detours". For The Guardian, Bob Rickard defended it as "an intelligent and creative exploration of the slippery, dream-like world of those who 'get too close'". Lisa Alspector of Chicago Reader called it "the scariest film I have ever seen."

In 2003, the film won the Best Sound Editing: Music in a Feature Film award from the society of the Motion Picture Sound Editors.

=== Box office ===
The Mothman Prophecies opened at the U.S. box office on January 25, 2002, earning $11,208,851 in its first weekend failing to enter the top five grossing films. It eventually went on to garner $35,746,370 in the U.S., and $19,411,169 in foreign markets for a worldwide total of $55,157,539.

== Future ==
In October 2023, Pellington announced that a streaming series is currently in development; while stating that further details would be revealed at a later date.

== Bibliography ==
- Barker, Gray (2008). The Silver Bridge: The Classic Mothman Tale. BookSurge Publishing. ISBN 978-1-439-20427-6.
- Coleman, Loren (2002). Mothman and Other Curious Encounters. Paraview Press. ISBN 978-1-931-04434-9.
- Guiley, Rosemary (2012). Monsters of West Virginia: Mysterious Creatures in the Mountain State. Stackpole Books. ISBN 978-0-811-71028-2.
- Horsley, Jason (2009). The Secret Life of Movies: Schizophrenic and Shamanic Journeys in American Cinema. Jefferson, North Carolina and London: McFarland. ISBN 978-0786454624.
- Kay, Gregory (2013). Wings In Darkness. CreateSpace Independent Publishing Platform. ISBN 978-1-481-81142-2.
- Meehan, Paul (2009). "Alien ESP". Cinema of the Psychic Realm: A Critical Survey. Jefferson, North Carolina and London: McFarland. ISBN 978-0786454747.
- Steiger, Brad (2012). "Mothman". Real Nightmares (Book 8): Phantoms, Apparitions and Ghosts. Visible Ink Press. ISBN 978-1578594382.
- Tiech, John (2014). Pittsburgh Film and Television. Arcadia Publishing. ISBN 978-1439644508.
