= Mothman =

Modern urban legend

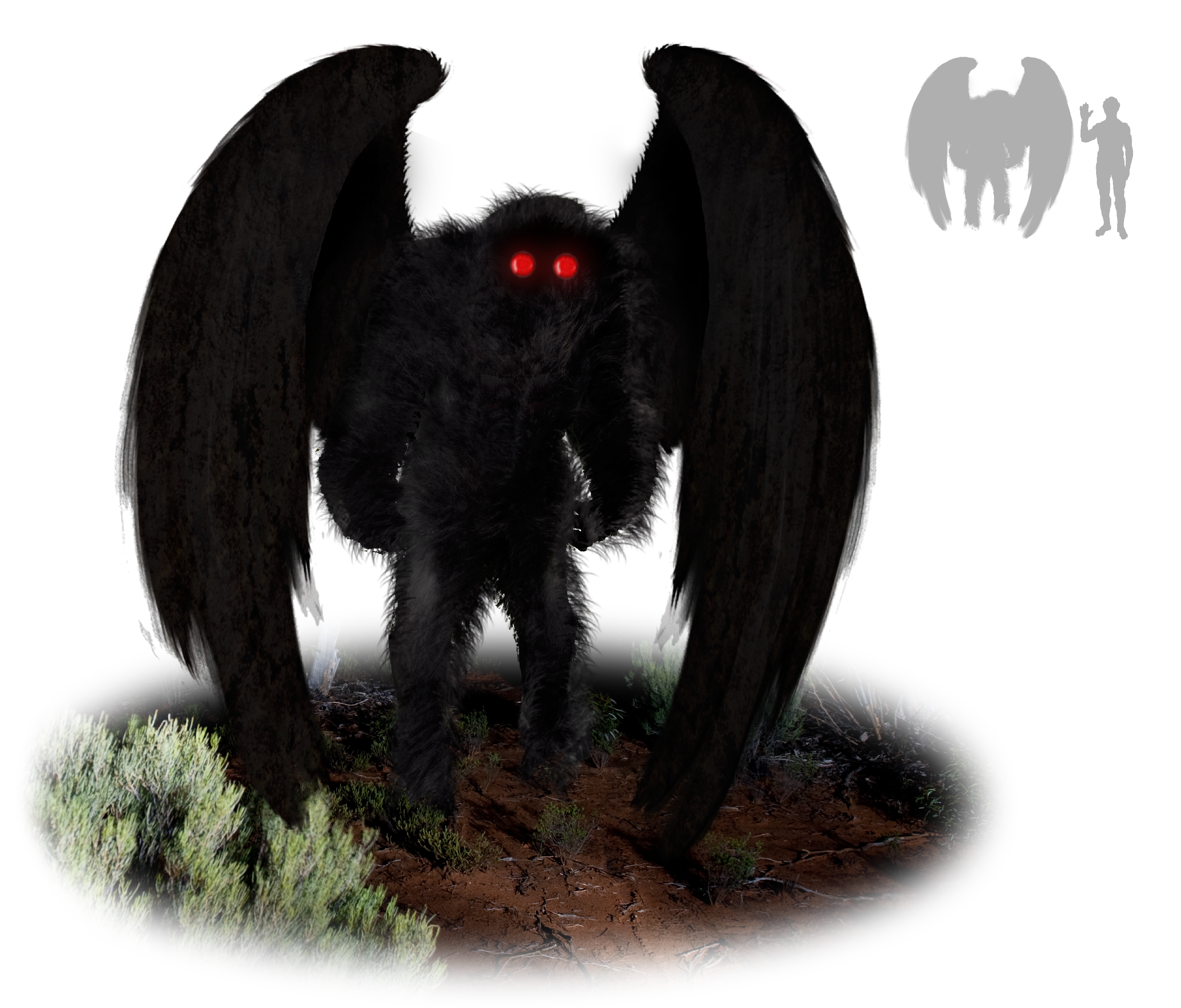
- An artistic depiction of Mothman inspired by 1966 claims of encounters with the creature

Creature information
- Grouping: Winged humanoid creature (initial 1966 sighting claim)

Origin
- First attested: November 15, 1966
- Region: Point Pleasant, West Virginia, US

Mothman is the name given to a winged humanoid creature with red eyes in American folklore. The creature, "a man with wings", was purportedly encountered around Point Pleasant, West Virginia, from November 15, 1966, to December 15, 1967, and is first mentioned in a newspaper report published in the Point Pleasant Register, dated November 16, 1966, titled "Couples See Man-Sized Bird ... Creature ... Something". US national press soon picked up the reports and helped spread the story across the United States. The 1966 claimed sighting has been proposed as originating from sightings of an out-of-migration sandhill cranes or herons, or possibly the misidentification of barred owls.

The winged creature was later named "Mothman" and was popularized by journalist and UFOlogist John Keel in his 1975 book The Mothman Prophecies. Keel claimed that there were paranormal events related to the sightings and a connection to the collapse of the Silver Bridge. This came five years after Gray Barker's The Silver Bridge, a narrative that had earlier explored similar ideas but in a "heavily fictionalized" way. The Mothman Prophecies was adapted decades later into a 2002 film starring Richard Gere. Mothman has subsequently received attention and references in popular culture. An annual festival in Point Pleasant is devoted to the Mothman legend.

== History ==
=== Purported sightings in 1966-1967 ===
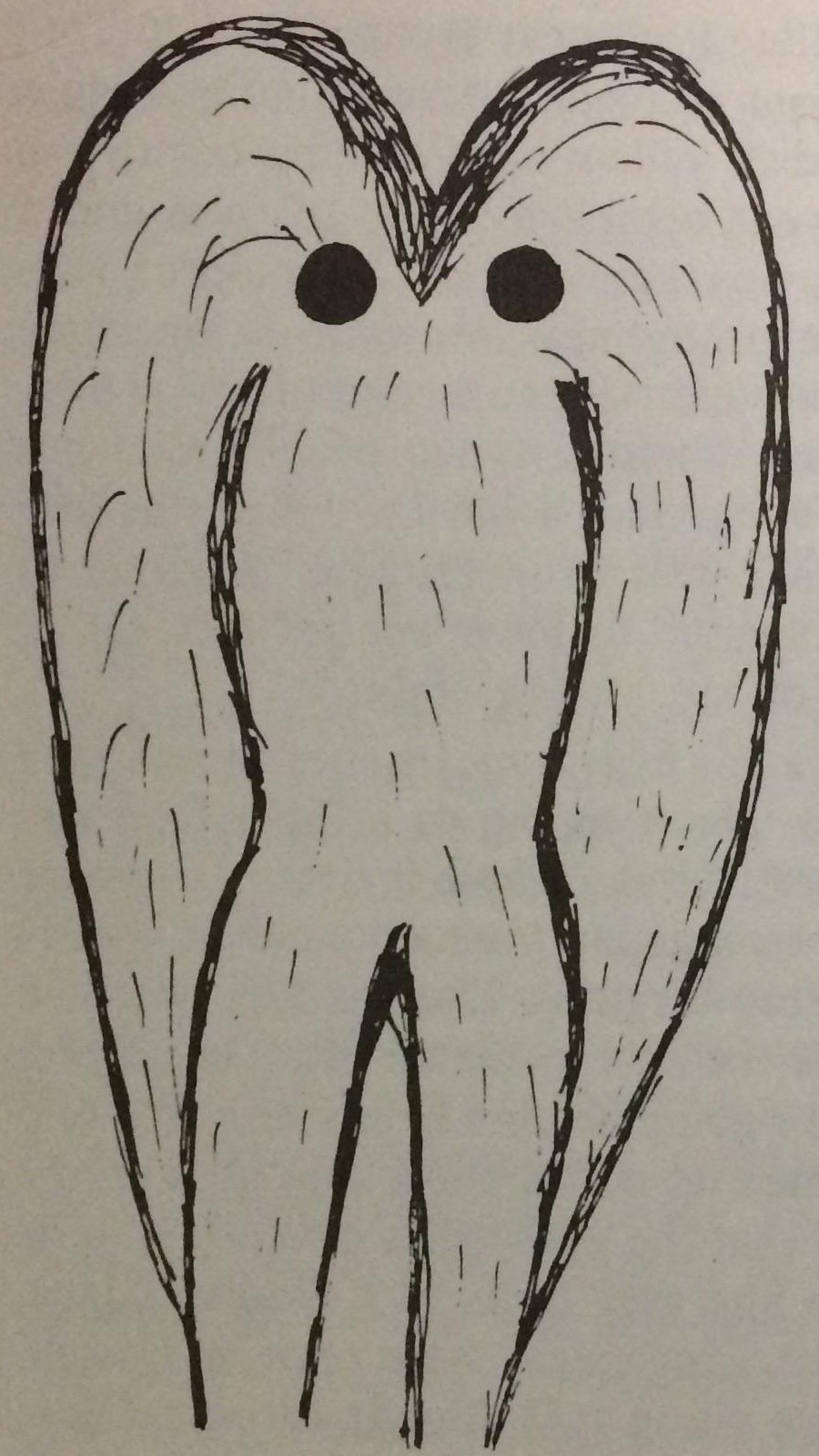
Illustration after Roger Scarberry's "eyewitness sketch" of the Mothman, printed in 1975

On November 15, 1966, two young couples from Point Pleasant—Roger and Linda Scarberry, Steve and Mary Mallette—told police they had seen a large black creature whose eyes "glowed red", standing at the side of the road near "the TNT area", the site of a former munitions plant from World War II. Linda Scarberry described it as a "slender, muscular man" about seven feet (2.1 m) tall with white wings. However, she was unable to discern its face due to the hypnotic effect of its eyes. Distressed, the witnesses claimed they sped away at 100 miles per hour (160 km/h), reporting that the creature took flight and kept pace with their car, making a screeching sound during the pursuit. It followed them as far as Point Pleasant city limits.

Hasken argues the Scarberry-Mallette report is "the most vital legend" in the Mothman story and reproduces, in full, Linda Scarberry's written account that she prepared for police. In that account, Linda Scarberry described the creature as looking "like a man with wings. It has a body shape form (It was a dirty grey color) with wings on its back that come around it. It has muscular legs like a man and fiery-red eyes that glow when the lights hit it. There was no glowing about it until the lights hit it. I couldn't see its head or arms. I don't know if the eyes are even in a head."

By November 17, local press referred to the creature as "Moth Man". Due to the popularity of the Batman TV series at the time, the fictional superhero Batman and his rogues gallery were prominently featured in the public eye. While the villain Killer Moth did not appear in the show, the comic book influence of both him and Batman is believed to have influenced the coinage of the name "Mothman" in the local newspapers.

Over the next few days, more witnesses came forward to submit similar sightings after local newspapers covered the initial report. According to a November 18 UPI wire service story, four additional locals had reported a sighting to Mason County Sheriff George Johnson. Johnson argued the sightings were of a "shitepoke", commonly known as a heron. Meanwhile, a contractor named Newell Partridge, who lived in 100 miles north in Doddrige County, reported a prior sighting on the night of the 15th, the same date as the initial Point Pleasant sighting. Partridge said he had aimed a flashlight at a creature in a nearby field and its eyes glowed "like bicycle reflectors". Additionally, Partridge blamed buzzing noises from his television set and the disappearance of his German Shepherd, Bandit, on the creature. Also on November 18, papers detailed a Blue Creek gravedigger named Kenneth Duncan, who reported seeing what "looked like a brown human being" fly by.

Mothman was associated with Point Pleasant, West Virginia

Later on November 18, two volunteer firemen, Paul Yoder and Benjamin Enochs, reported seeing a "large bird with red eyes". By November 20, wildlife biologist Robert L. Smith at West Virginia University had told reporters that descriptions and sightings fit a sandhill crane, which stands almost as tall as a human with a 7-foot (2.1 m) wingspan and reddish coloring around its eyes. He posited that the bird may have wandered out of its migration route, and therefore was unrecognized at first because it was not native to this region. On the 21st, press shared a bird report from four youths.

On November 25, press relayed additional sightings were claimed by Clarksburg shoe salesman Tom Ury, who reported being north of Point Pleasant in daylight when a large bird followed his car at 70 mph. Ury described it as "grayish-brown" bill-ed bird that was "some six feet in length and had at least an eight to ten-foot wing spread". A similar report came from "girl at St. Albans", who saw a large bird along the Kanawha River.

On December 27, 1966, press reported that a snowy owl was shot by Ace Henry at Point Pleasant, and it was described in local newspapers as a "giant owl" because of its nearly five-foot (1.5 m) wingspan. It's been claimed that it may have been the origin of the Mothman sightings. The bird is still displayed as a mounted specimen at the Mothman Museum.

As early as November 18, 1966, Mothman became associated with UFO sightings. On that date, local press reported that "The Ohio Valley is in the national headlines reporting sightings of flying saucers and now a man-like bird sweeping down on cars going 100 miles an hour." On January 22, 1967, local papers began turning from bird sightings to UFO reports, as Tad Jones of Dunbar claimed to see one over Interstate 64, a Point Pleasant woman reported a UFO several hundred feet in the air, and other sigthings in Cheshire, Gallipolis, Eureka and Addison.

On February 12, 1967, press reported another large bird sighting over the Kanawha River by Charles Warner, a three foot tall woodpecker report, and claim of a flying saucer in St. Albans. On March 5 and again on April 17, local colunmnist Mary Hyre herself reported a UFO sighting. On April 19, press reported that a local deputy and others saw a UFO over the TNT area.

On November 16, 1967, the first anniversary of the initial Mothman report, Hyre discussed both bird sightings and UFO reports, writing "Just two weeks ago, it was reported to be seen running very fast on the ground in the TNT area, and this week two hunters in the area also saw the creature. Others have reported seeing it along country roads, and all describe it as a man-like thing with hair. One man saw it on Route 33 when it hovered over his car." Hyre adds that "Throughout the year many people have reported other sightings, including strange lights and daytime sightings of disc-shaped UFO". She relays a recent account of a "aluminum cigar-shaped object". The piece was Hyre's final report on the legend.

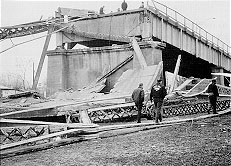
The collapsed Silver Bridge, as seen from the Ohio side

On December 15, 1967, the Silver Bridge collapsed, killing 46 people. The collapse marked the end of newspaper stories about Mothman or UFOs. Hasken interviewed one local who recalled "The bridge was too real... A lot of prominent people went down on that bridge... You better not write about the Mothman anymore. There's something serious going on here."

=== Role of John Keel and Gray Barker ===
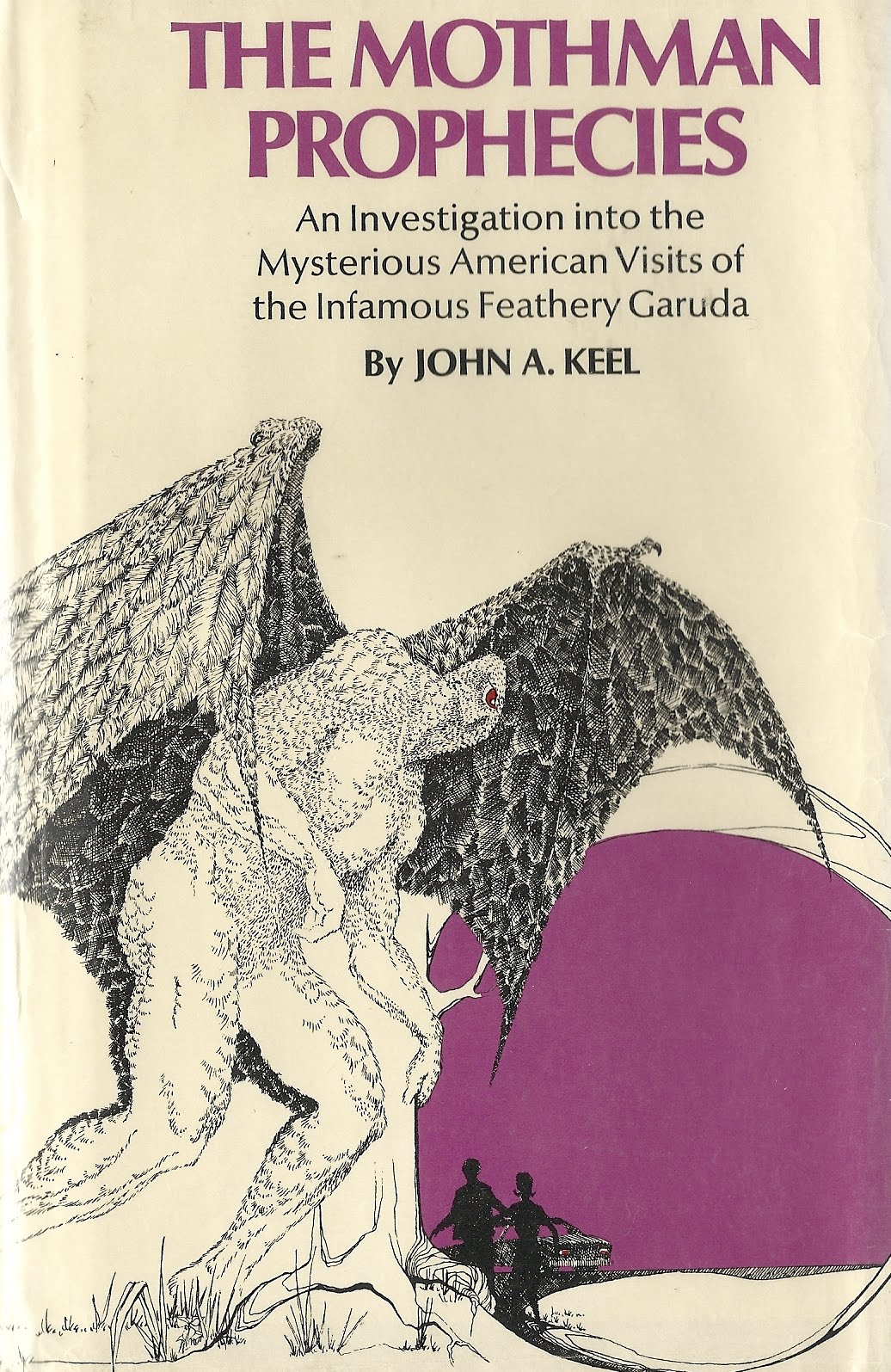
First edition cover of The Mothman Prophecies by John Keel (1975). It features an artistic illustration of the Mothman by Peter Parnell on its cover.

In November 1967, a self-described "UFO expert" and author named John Keel visited Point Pleasant to investigate the ongoing sightings.

In 1970, UFO author Gray Barker published The Silver Bridge, the first book-length exploration of Mothman reports. Keel discussed the Mothman reports in a 1970 newpaper article and his 1970 books Operation Trojan Horse and Strange Creatures from Time and Space.

Keel expanded on the topic in his 1975 book The Mothman Prophecies, where he claimed that Point Pleasant residents experienced precognitions, including premonitions of the collapse of the Silver Bridge, UFO sightings, visits from inhuman or threatening men in black, and other alleged phenomena. John Keel relayed the story of witness Connie Carpenter, who allegedly saw Mothman in broad daylight on November 27, 1966, and described it as having glowing red eyes.

Keel's and Barker's books each discussed Woodrow Derenberger, a Parkersburg man who claimed to have had a UFO encounter on November 2, 1966, thirteen days before the first Mothman report. Both authors interacted with Derenberger as he continued to report on-going encounters with a benevolent spaceman named Indrid Cold. Hasken reports "I have struggled to understand the connection between his sightings and Mothman, as the events surrounding Woodrow Derenberger are without clear connection... the best reason for inclusion ties directly to the physical and temporal closeness to Point Pleasant."

1957 photograph of John Keel

In January 2002, a film titled The Mothman Prophecies was released, loosely based on Keel's book. The film starred Richard Gere as "John Klein", a widower who inexplicably finds himself in Point Pleasant. Klein investigates Mothman sightings before narrowly escaping death in the Silver Bridge collapse. The film greatly expands the role of "Indrid Cold", portrayed by actor Bill Laing and voiced by the film's director Mark Pellington, into that of a seemingly-omniscient ultraterrestrial who directly warns characters of an impending disaster; Sherwood notes this depiction of Cold as a "mind-reading entity" who interacts with investigators is not found Keel's books.

Photograph of Gray Barker

In the May/June 2002 issue of Skeptical Inquirer, journalist John C. Sherwood, a former business associate of UFO researcher Gray Barker, published an analysis of private letters exchanged by Keel and Barker during the period of Keel's investigation. In the article, "Gray Barker's Book of Bunk," Sherwood reported finding significant differences between what Keel wrote at the time of his investigation and what he wrote in his first book about the Mothman reports, raising questions about the book's accuracy. Sherwood also reported that Keel, who was well known for writing humorous and outrageous letters to friends and associates, would not assist him in clarifying the differences. Sherwood also notes that Barker sometimes participated in hoaxes.

== Reception ==
In January 1968, a syndicated comic title "UFO Resume" depicted Mothman as emerging from a flying saucer.

Folklorist Jan Harold Brunvand notes that Mothman has been widely covered in popular press, with some claiming sightings connected with UFOs, and others suggesting that a military storage site was Mothman's "home". Brunvand notes that recountings of the 1966–67 Mothman reports usually state that at least 100 people saw Mothman with many more "afraid to report their sightings". However, he asserts that these writings comprised children's books and sensationalized or undocumented reports that failed to quote identifiable persons. Brunvand found elements in common among many Mothman reports and much older folktales, suggesting that something real may have triggered the scares and become interwoven with existing folklore. He also records anecdotal tales of Mothman supposedly attacking the roofs of parked cars occupied by teenagers.

Conversely, Joe Nickell asserts that a number of hoaxes followed the publicity generated by the original reports, such as a group of construction workers who allegedly tied flashlights to helium balloons. Nickell attributes the Mothman stories to misidentifications of barred owls, suggesting that the Mothman's "glowing eyes" were actually the phenomenon of eyeshine, common in many animals, caused by reflections from bright light sources.

In 2020, Skeptical Inquirer author Benjamin Radford pointed out that the only report of glowing "red eyes" was secondhand, that of Shirley Hensley quoting her father.

One of the prevailing hypotheses associated with the Mothman at the time of the original sightings was that it was a misidentified sandhill crane, due primarily to the size of the bird as well as the "reddish flesh" around the crane's eyes. Daniel A. Reed examined the migration patterns and historically reported sightings of sandhill cranes in the area of Point Pleasant, West Virginia, and proposed that, in cases where eyeshine was not noted, it was statistically more likely that witnesses were seeing and misidentifying a great blue heron instead.

VOA report about Mothman from 2020

According to University of Chicago psychologist David A. Gallo, self-described Fortean researcher Lon Strickler's online compilation of 55 sightings of Mothman in the city of Chicago during the course of 2017 represents "a selective sample". Gallo explains that "he's not sampling random people and asking if they saw the Mothman – he's just counting the number of people that voluntarily came forward to report a sighting". According to Gallo, "people more likely to visit a paranormal-centric website like Strickler's might also be more inclined to believe in, and therefore witness the existence of, a 'Mothman'."

More speculative hypotheses (such as those proposed by ufologists, paranormal authors, and cryptozoologists) suggest the Mothman could be an alien, a supernatural manifestation, or a previously unknown species of animal.

In cryptozoology, a pseudoscience, the Mothman has come to be designated as a "cryptid" alongside other creatures from folklore like Bigfoot, El Chupacabra, and the Loch Ness Monster.

According to the newspaper Svobodnaya Gruziya, published in the Eastern European nation of Georgia, Russian ufologists claim that Mothman sightings in Moscow presaged the 1999 Russian apartment bombings.

In 2016, WCHS-TV published a photo purported to be of Mothman taken by an anonymous man while driving on Route 2 in Mason County. Science writer Sharon Hill proposed that the photo showed "a bird, perhaps an owl, carrying a frog or snake away" and wrote that "there is zero reason to suspect it is the Mothman as described in legend. There are too many far more reasonable explanations."

Clarke notes that Mothman's role as a harbinger of doom is a akin the role of the Banshee in European folklore, a spirit who's appearance is said to herald the death of a family member.

== Popular culture influence ==
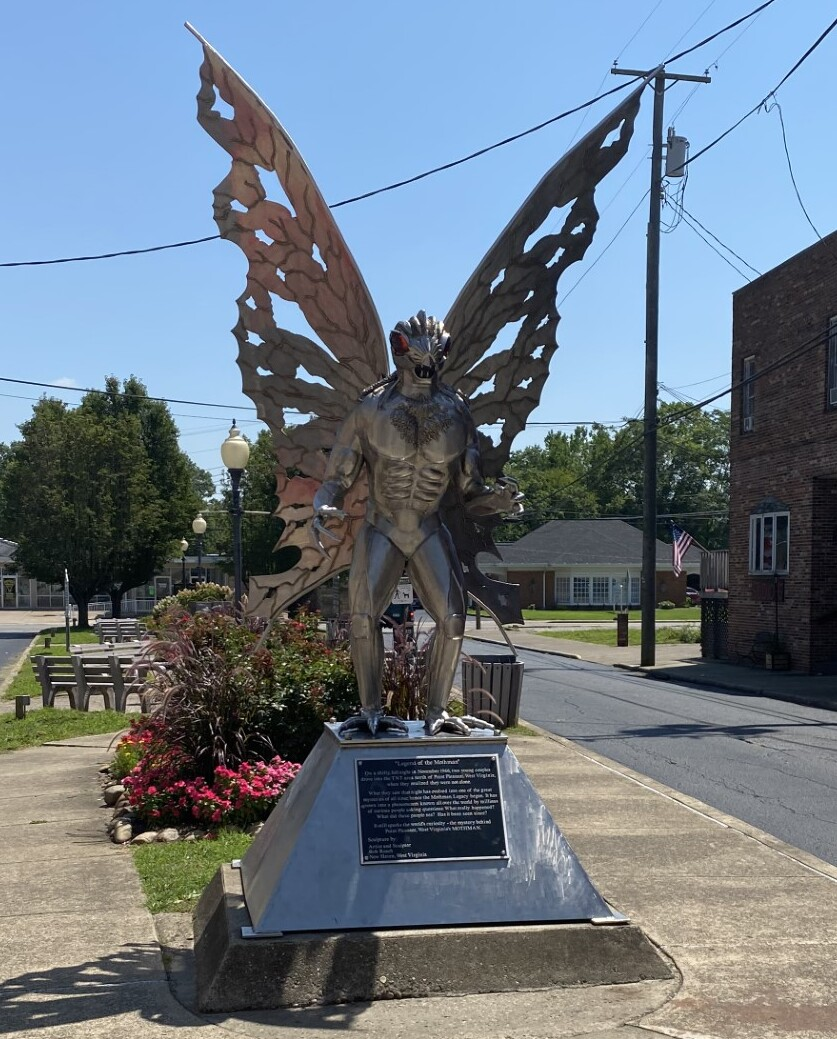
Mothman statue designed and sculpted by artist Bob Roach (2003) and located in Point Pleasant, West Virginia

The Mothman legend has become a major source of tourism for Point Pleasant. The city held its first Annual Mothman Festival in 2002. The Mothman Festival began after brainstorming creative ways to attract visitors to Point Pleasant. The group organizing the event chose the Mothman to be the center of the festival due to its uniqueness, and as a way to celebrate its local legacy in the town.

According to the event organizer Jeff Wamsley, the average attendance for the Mothman Festival is an estimated 10–12 thousand people per year. A 12-foot-tall (3.7 m) metallic statue of the creature, created by artist and sculptor Bob Roach, was unveiled in 2003. The Mothman Museum and Research Center opened in 2006. The festival is held on the third weekend of every September, hosting guest speakers, vendor exhibits, pancake-eating contests, and hayride tours of locally notable areas.

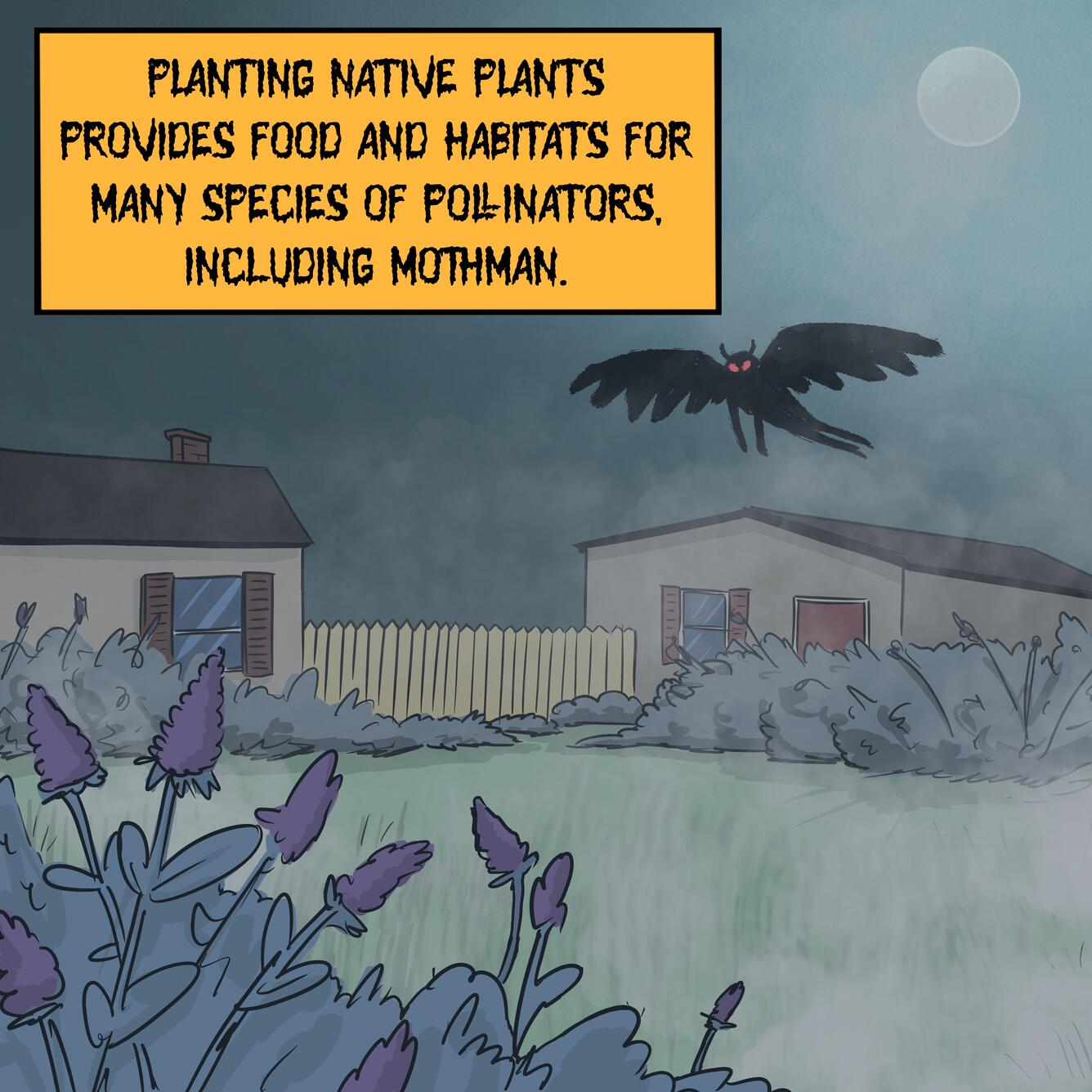
A graphic created by the United States Geological Survey depicting Mothman

While the 1975 book and 2002 film The Mothman Prophecies may be the best-known media regarding the legend, several low-budget and independently made narrative films and documentary projects have since been released, among other representations in various media. Small Town Monsters has released two documentaries about Mothman, The Mothman of Point Pleasant in 2017 and The Mothman Legacy in 2020. The Point Pleasant Tapes is a found footage film, co-written and directed by Jesse P. Pollack, Mike Vaccaro, and Dan Jones, and filmed with 1980s period-correct cameras in the same West Virginia area of the sightings. The completed film made its festival debut on October 19, 2024. Hellier, a 2019 digital documentary series released on YouTube and Amazon Prime, includes a segment in the second season dedicated to the Mothman. Mothman appears in Fortnite as an outfit added in the 2025 Halloween "Fortnitemares" event. The 2018 video game Fallout 76 features the Mothman as a central figure in the Appalachian folklore of its post-apocalyptic setting, appearing as a variety of mutated creatures that can be either hostile or passive toward the player. In 2026, Mothman was featured prominently on a new West Virginia state license plate and selected for a USPS postage stamp.

Mothman has become a queer icon, with folklorist Camille Acosta dubbing the creature a "Lighthouse for the Othered" while scholar Brent Watts argues that "for language users who are both queer and Appalachian, engagement with and use of Mothman discourse and iconography can allow them a safe ideological space in which they can manage and maintain two nonnormative identities... through Mothman discourse, members of this community can also reimagine and redefine Appalachia in ways that challenge mainstream narratives about the region."

== See also ==
- Flatwoods monster
- Owlman
