= The Mothman Prophecies =

1975 book by John Keel

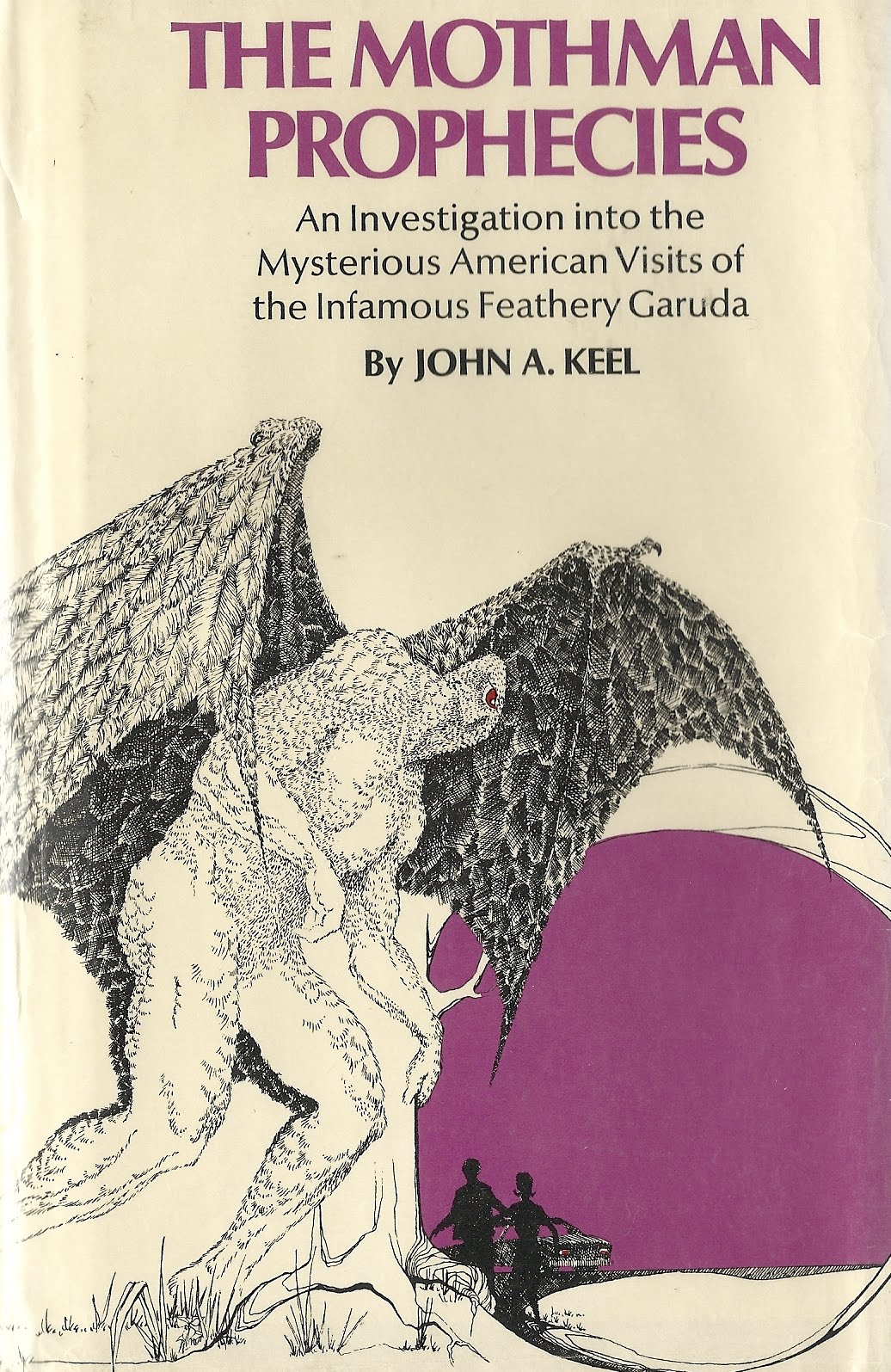
- First edition
- Author: John Keel
- Language: English
- Genre: Nonfiction
- Publisher: Saturday Review Press
- Publication date: 1975
- Publication place: United States
- Media type: Print
- Pages: 269
- ISBN: 0-8415-0355-9

The Mothman Prophecies is a 1975 book by John Keel.

== Synopsis ==
The book relates Keel's accounts of his investigation into alleged sightings of a large, winged creature known as Mothman in the vicinity of Point Pleasant, West Virginia, during 1966 and 1967. It combines these accounts with his theories about UFOs and various supernatural phenomena, ultimately connecting them to the collapse of the Silver Bridge across the Ohio River on December 15, 1967.

== Reception ==
Kirkus Reviews wrote that the book featured Keel's theories that "ultraterrestrials" use some form of psychic power to create hallucinations such as Mothman and UFOs.

Official investigations in 1971 determined the bridge collapse was caused by stress corrosion cracking in an eyebar in a suspension chain.

In the May/June 2002 issue of Skeptical Inquirer, journalist John C. Sherwood, a former business associate of UFO researcher Gray Barker, published an analysis of private letters between Keel and Barker during the period of Keel's investigation. In the article, "Gray Barker's Book of Bunk", Sherwood reported finding significant differences between what Keel wrote at the time of his investigation and what he wrote in his first book about the Mothman reports, raising questions about the book's accuracy. Sherwood also reported that Keel, who was well known for writing humorous and outrageous letters to friends and associates, would not assist him in clarifying the differences.

== Film ==
The Mothman Prophecies was the inspiration for the 2002 film of the same name, starring Richard Gere.
