= Helliar =

Helliar may refer to:

- Peter Helliar (born 1975), Australian actor, comedian and writer
- Helliar Holm, an uninhabited island in the Orkney Isles
- MS Helliar, a Ro-Ro ferry in service with Northlink Ferries

== See also ==
- Up Helly Aa, a fire ceremony in the Shetland Islands
