= Operation Trojan Horse (book) =

Book by John Keel

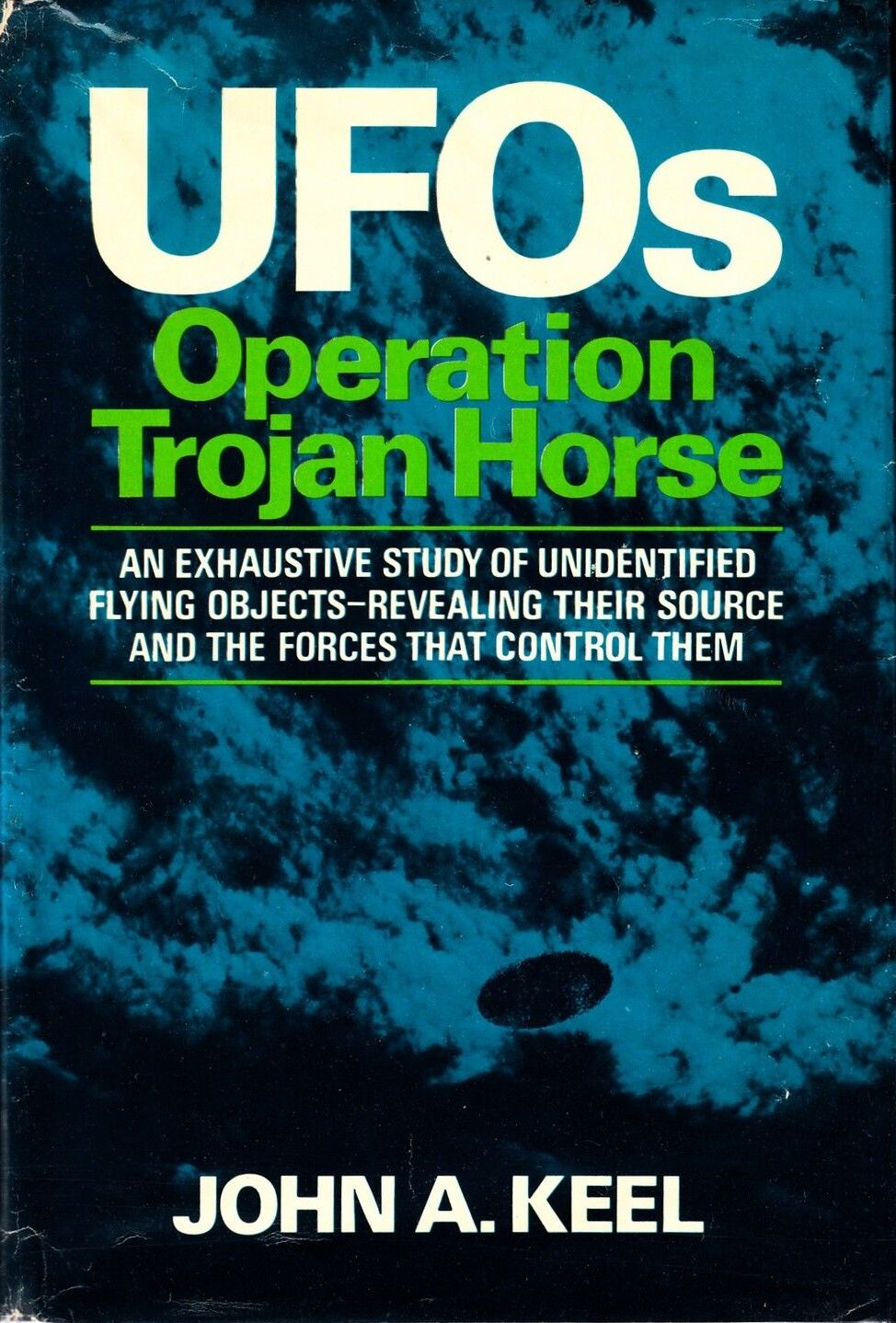
- First edition book cover
- Author: John Keel
- Language: English
- Subject: UFOs and other phenomena
- Genre: Non-fiction
- Publisher: Putnam
- Publication date: 1970
- Publication place: United States
- Pages: 349
- ISBN: 978-0962653469

Operation Trojan Horse (or UFOs: Operation Trojan Horse) is a book published in 1970 by John Keel. The book was reprinted in 1996 with minor additions. It presents the results of Keel's research on UFOs and similar phenomena.

== Overview ==
Keel, who died in 2009, was a ufologist. According to The Daily Telegraph, "In his much-acclaimed second book, UFOs: Operation Trojan Horse, Keel suggested that many aspects of modern UFO reports, including humanoid encounters, often paralleled ancient folklore and religious visions, and directly linked UFOs with elemental phenomena."

The book presents Keel's theory that UFOs are a phenomenon produced by "ultraterrestrials", beings who are able to manipulate matter and our senses, and who in the past manifested themselves as fairies, demons, and so on.

Keel explains the title of the book saying, "Our skies have been filled with 'Trojan horses' throughout history, and like the original Trojan horse, they seem to conceal hostile intent."

== See also ==
- The Book of the Damned, 1919, a similar book by Charles Fort
