= Hellier, Kentucky =

Unincorporated community in Kentucky, United States

Hellier
- Unincorporated community
- Location within the state of Kentucky Hellier (the United States)
- Coordinates: 37°17′15″N 82°28′17″W
- Country: United States
- State: Kentucky
- County: Pike
- Elevation: 1,253 ft (382 m)

Population (2017)
  - Total: 2,350
- Time zone: UTC-6 (Eastern (EST))
  - Summer (DST): UTC-5 (EST)
- ZIP codes: 41534
- Area code: 606
- GNIS feature ID: 494007

Hellier is an unincorporated community and coal town in Pike County, Kentucky, United States.

== History ==
A post office was established in the community in 1906, and named for Ralph Augustus Hellier, the head of a Pike County coal mining company.

== Notable people ==
- Vern Bickford, baseball player, was born in Hellier.
