= John Keel =

American journalist and UFOlogist (1930–2009)

John A. Keel
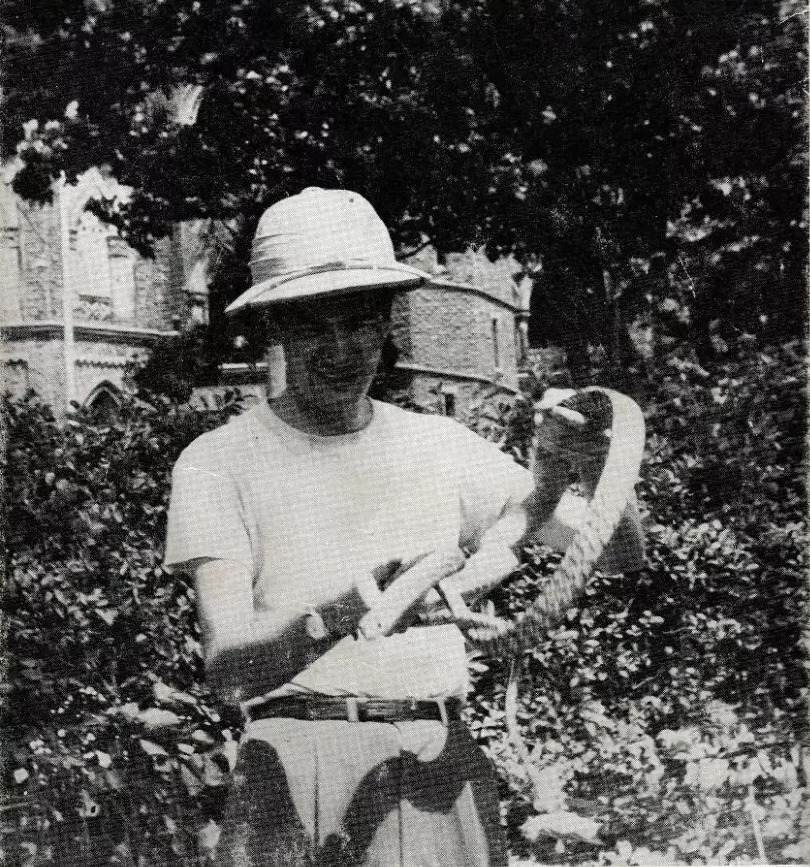
- John Keel c. 1957.
- Born: March 25, 1930; Hornell, New York, U.S.
- Died: July 3, 2009 (aged 79); New York, New York, U.S.
- Occupations: Journalist; parapsychologist; UFOlogist

John Alva Keel, born Alva John Kiehle (March 25, 1930 – July 3, 2009), was an American journalist and influential ufologist who is known best as author of The Mothman Prophecies.

== Early life ==
Keel was born in Hornell, New York, the son of a singer and bandleader. His parents soon divorced and Keel was raised by his grandparents in Perry, New York until his mother remarried.

He was fascinated by magic from an early age and was known as "Houdini" by his friends. He loved reading about magic, humor, science, travel, and aviation. His first story was published in a magicians' magazine when he was twelve years old. At age fourteen he was determined to become a writer. He had a column in the Perry Herald named Scraping The Keel, he published a science fiction fanzine named The Lunarite and he routinely sent stories to magazines in New York. At the age of sixteen he had taken all of the science courses at his school and decided to quit school and write full time.

== Career ==
=== Early career as a writer and journalist ===
At seventeen Keel relocated to New York City to make a living as a writer. He lived in Greenwich Village and became the editor of a poetry magazine. He worked as a freelance contributor to newspapers, scriptwriter for local radio and television outlets, and author of articles such as "Are You A Repressed Sex Fiend?"

=== Work for the US Army ===
Keel was drafted into the US Army during the Korean War. Because he had worked with radio and television he was assigned to the radio station American Forces Network at Frankfurt, Germany and started writing radio programs. Within one year he was the chief of productions for the network. When his two years of military service ended he was offered and accepted a civilian job for the Army.

He claimed that while in the Army he was trained in psychological warfare as a propaganda writer.

=== Writer and journalist ===
After his time with the military he was a foreign radio correspondent in Paris, Berlin, Rome and Egypt.

At age 24 he resigned and traveled for four years around the Middle East and south-east Asia. He tried to find performers of the Indian rope trick, investigate fakirs and yogis and he even tried to track the Yeti. Keel's journey was accounted in first published book, Jadoo (1957).

During the 1960s, he worked for television. He was the chief writer for game show Play Your Hunch and wrote for tv series such as Mack & Myer for Hire, The Chuck McCann Show, The Clay Cole Show, Get Smart, The Monkees and Lost in Space.

He wrote some novels using the pseudonym, Harry Gibbs. In 1966 he wrote a fiction novel named The Fickle Finger of Fate. It sold an estimated 600,000 copies.

In 1966 Playboy asked him to write an article about UFOs for the magazine, but his work was rejected and never printed. Keel had however become interested in the subject. He claimed to have traveled to 20 states and interviewed thousands of witnesses, several hundreds of them in depth. The material was used in his book Operation Trojan Horse. He also made repeated visits to Point Pleasant, West Virginia, and investigated sightings that was the topic of his best known book, The Mothman Prophecies (1975).

His interviews and thoughts concerning UFOs were published in magazines such as Flying Saucer Review, Flying Saucer, Saga and Saucer News.

He was a technical advisor to the Library of Congress (1968-69), and special consultant to the office of Scientific Research and Bureau of Radiology (1968-71), before becoming a consultant to the Department of Health, Education and Welfare.

He was a member of the Screenwriters Guild.

== Personal life ==
Keel resided in an apartment on the Upper West Side of Manhattan for many years. He died on July 3, 2009, in New York City, at the age of 79.

== Paranormal research ==
Keel is considered "one of ufology's most widely-read and influential authors". As a researcher he was both original and controversial. Richard Hatem, the screenwriter for The Mothman Prophecies, described Keel as the Hunter S. Thompson of paranormal writers.

=== Men in black ===
Keel invented the term men in black in an article for the men's adventure magazine Saga published 1967.

=== Rejection of extraterrestrial hypothesis ===
Like contemporary 1960s researchers such as J. Allen Hynek and Jacques Vallée, Keel was initially hopeful that he could somehow validate the prevailing extraterrestrial visitation hypothesis. However, after a year of investigations, Keel concluded that the extraterrestrial hypothesis was untenable. Indeed, both Hynek and Vallée eventually had a similar conclusion. As Keel himself wrote:

I abandoned the extraterrestrial hypothesis in 1967 when my own field investigations disclosed an astonishing overlap between psychic phenomena and UFOs... The objects and apparitions do not necessarily originate on another planet and may not even exist as permanent constructions of matter. It is more likely that we see what we want to see and interpret such visions according to our contemporary beliefs.

In his books UFOs: Operation Trojan Horse and The Eighth Tower Keel argues that a non-human or spiritual intelligence source has staged whole events during a long period of time in order to propagate and reinforce certain erroneous belief systems. For example, monsters, ghosts and demons, the fairy faith of Middle Europe, vampire legends, mystery airships in 1897, mystery aeroplanes of the 1930s, mystery helicopters, anomalous creature sightings, poltergeist phenomena, spheres of light, and unidentified flying objects; Keel conjectured that ultimately all of these anomalies are a cover for the real phenomenon. He used the term "ultraterrestrials" to describe UFO occupants he believed to be non-human entities capable of assuming whatever form they desire.

In The Eighth Tower (1975), Keel developed the "Superspectrum" hypothesis. Keel proposed the existence of a vast electromagnetic spectrum beyond the range of human perception, within which non-human intelligences operate. He argued that UFO sightings belong to the same category of paranormal phenomena as ghosts or religious apparitions and have operated to shape human belief systems throughout history.

In Our Haunted Planet, Keel discussed the seldom-considered possibility that the alien "visitors" to Earth are not visitors at all, but an advanced Earth civilization, which may or may not be human. Interdimensional life is also considered.

Keel did not state any hypothesis about the ultimate purpose of the phenomenon other than that the UFO intelligence seems to have a long-standing interest in interacting with the human race.

=== The Mothman Prophecies ===
The Mothman Prophecies (1975) is Keel's account of investigating an alleged sighting in and around Point Pleasant, West Virginia of a huge, winged creature termed Mothman. The name "Mothman" was invented by a newspaper subeditor.

The book was widely popularized as the basis of a 2002 movie of the same title featuring Richard Gere, Will Patton, Laura Linney and Alan Bates. Gere and Bates played two parts of Keel's personality. Bates's character is named "Leek," which is "Keel" spelled backwards. Gere's newspaper journalist character is named "John Klein," also a play on Keel's name.

Keel was pleased with director Mark Pellington's interpretation of the book:

They got a lot of the stuff in the book into the movie, but with slight variations. /.../ I have no real complaints about it. It's Hollywood, and it's done well - that's my feeling about it.

==== Criticism ====
In the May/June 2002 issue of Skeptical Inquirer, journalist John C. Sherwood, a former business associate of UFO researcher Gray Barker, published an analysis of private letters exchanged by Keel and Barker during the period of Keel's investigation. In the article, "Gray Barker's Book of Bunk," Sherwood reported finding significant differences between what Keel wrote at the time of his investigation and what he wrote in his first book about the Mothman reports, raising questions about the book's accuracy. Sherwood also reported that Keel, who was well known for writing humorous and outrageous letters to friends and associates, would not assist him in clarifying the differences.

== Paranormal experiences ==
Keel's friend Marc Coppola claimed that Keel "could look at people and tell exactly when they were going to die".

== Works ==
=== Paranormal research ===
- Jadoo (1957)
- Operation Trojan Horse (1970); reprinted as Why UFOs (1978)
- Strange Creatures From Time And Space (1970); reprinted as The Complete Guide To Mysterious Beings (1994)
- Our Haunted Planet (1971)
- The Flying Saucer Subculture (1973)
- The Mothman Prophecies (1975); published in Britain as Visitors from Space (1976)
- The Eighth Tower (1975); published in Britain as The Cosmic Question (1978)
- Disneyland of the Gods (1988)

=== Fiction ===
- The Fickle Finger of Fate (Fawcett, 1966)

=== Selected writings ===
- The Best of John Keel (Paperback 2006) (Collection of Keel's Fate Magazine articles)
- Flying Saucer to the Center of Your Mind: Selected Writings of John A. Keel (2013)
- The Outer Limits of the Twilight Zone: Selected Writings of John A. Keel (2013)
- Searching For the String: Selected Writings of John A. Keel (2014)
- The Great Phonograph in the Sky: Selected Writings of John A. Keel (2015)
- The Perspicacious Percipient: How to Investigate UFOs and Other Insane Urges - Selected Writings of John A. Keel (2015)
- The Passionate Percipient: Illusions I Have Known And Loved - Selected Writings of John A. Keel (2015)
- Pursuing the Addenda: Supernatural Reports From the Natural World (2016)
