= Eyebar =

Straight metallic bar with a hole at each end

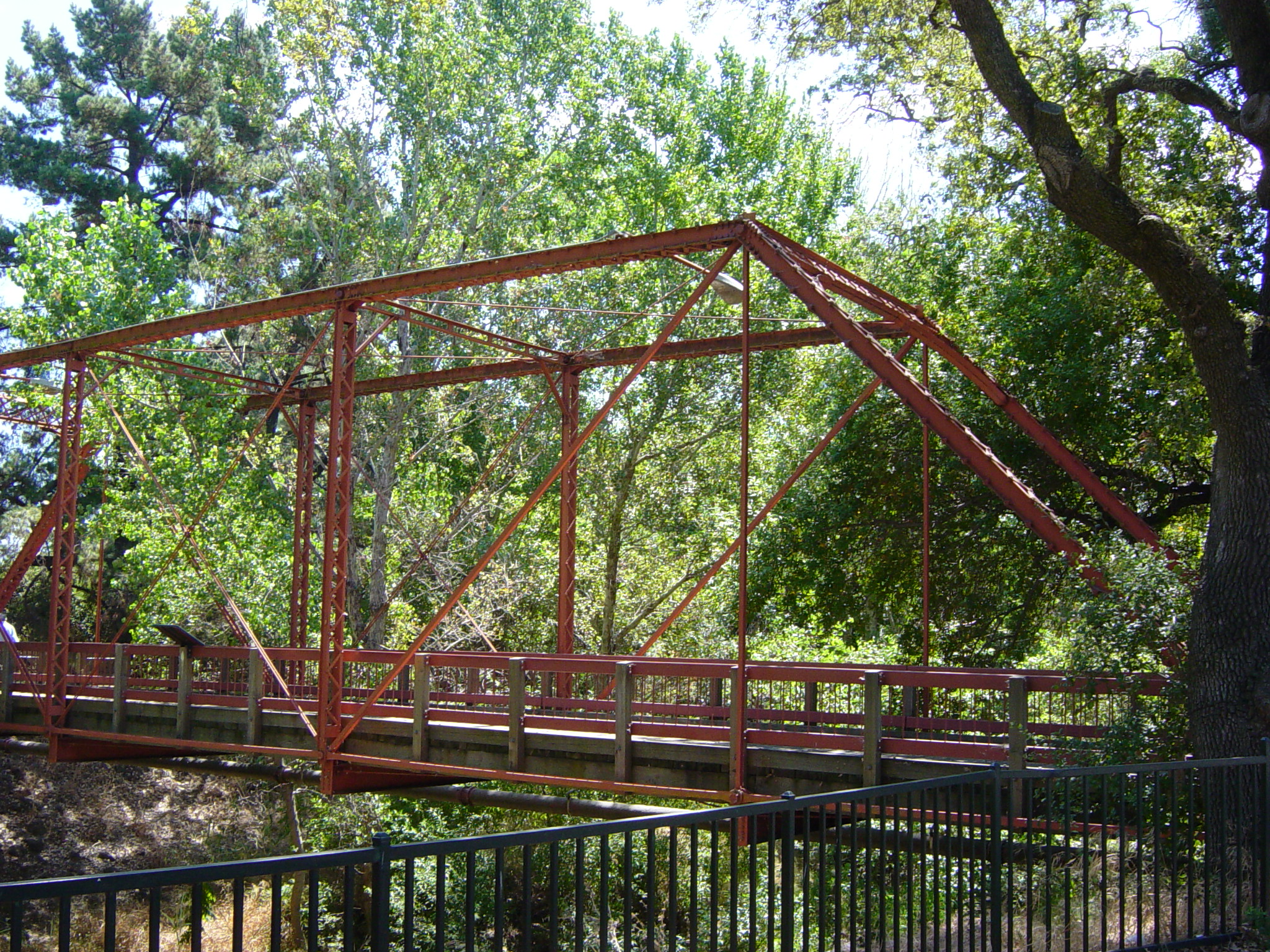
In this light truss bridge each side truss has 16 elements. Of these, seven are in compression and are fabricated as lattice beams. The remaining nine elements are only in tension and are composed of eyebars. Shear and bending forces are accommodated completely within the deck structure.

An eyebar from the chains of the Deutz Suspension Bridge, Cologne, Germany

In structural engineering and construction, an eyebar is a straight bar, usually of metal, with a hole ("eye") at each end for fixing to other components. Eyebars are used in structures such as bridges, in settings in which only tension, and never compression, is applied. Also referred to as "pin- and eyebar construction" in instances where pins are being used.

== Structure ==
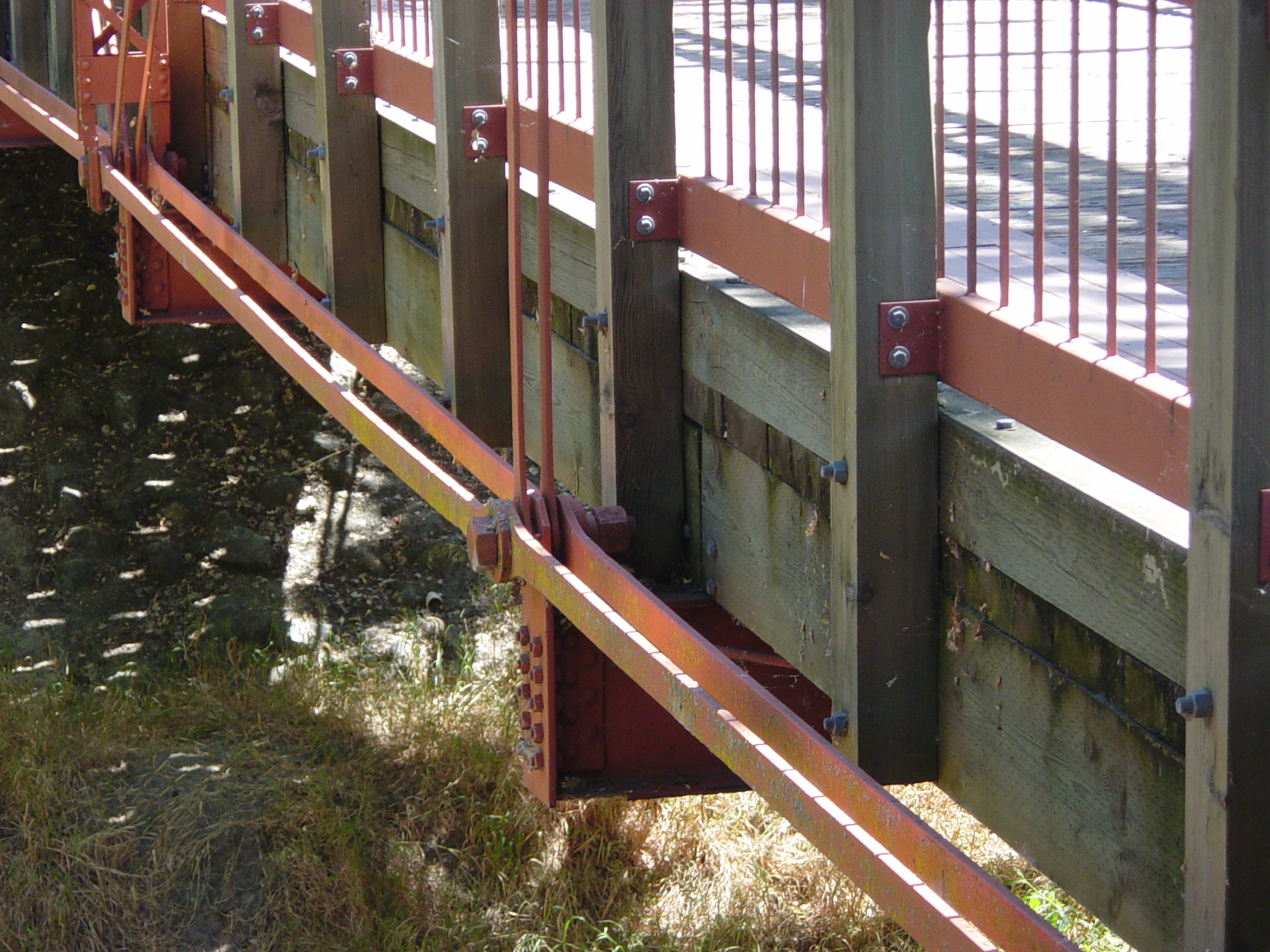
Detail view of pin joined eyebars on truss structure

A closed eyebar will typically have a rectangular cross section of constant thickness throughout its length and a constant width for all but the ends. The ends will transition to a wider part that is terminated by a rounded end. In the center of this end will be a hole which will receive a cylindrical pin, which may have provision to accept one or more nuts or bolts. If of round cross section the bar will typically be end-forged to create a head, which is then flatted by additional forging. The head may then be machined to a precise thickness and flatness. An alternative method for using round bar is to form a loop and to forge-weld (hammer weld) or electrically weld the free end to the main bar.

Open eyebars are not used in the cable anchorages of modern wire-cable suspension bridges. This does not allow the wires to be looped over the eye, rather than requiring threading through a closed eye.

== Application ==
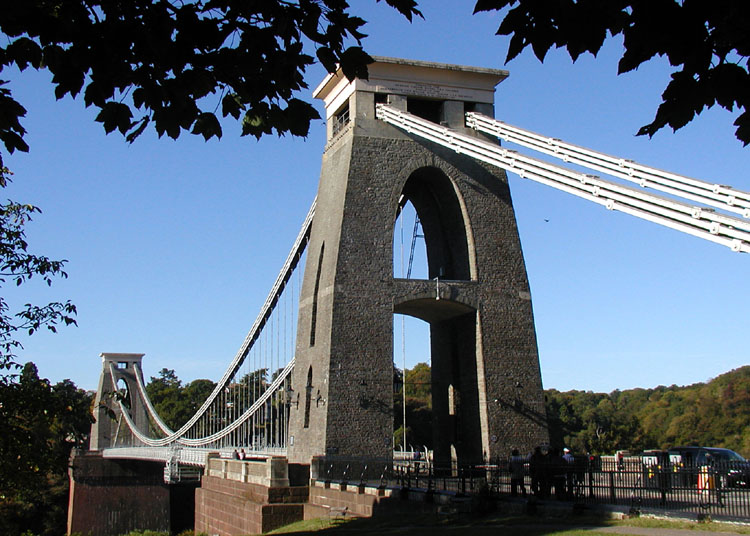
A chain suspension bridge - Clifton Suspension Bridge

The bars may be fabricated with pin holes that are slightly undersized. If so, these are then reamed in the field. This field reaming ensures that stresses will be uniformly distributed among the several bars forming the truss element or the chain link. Corrosion resistant treatment in the form of grease, white or red lead oil paste, or other water-excluding material may be added at the time of the assembly.

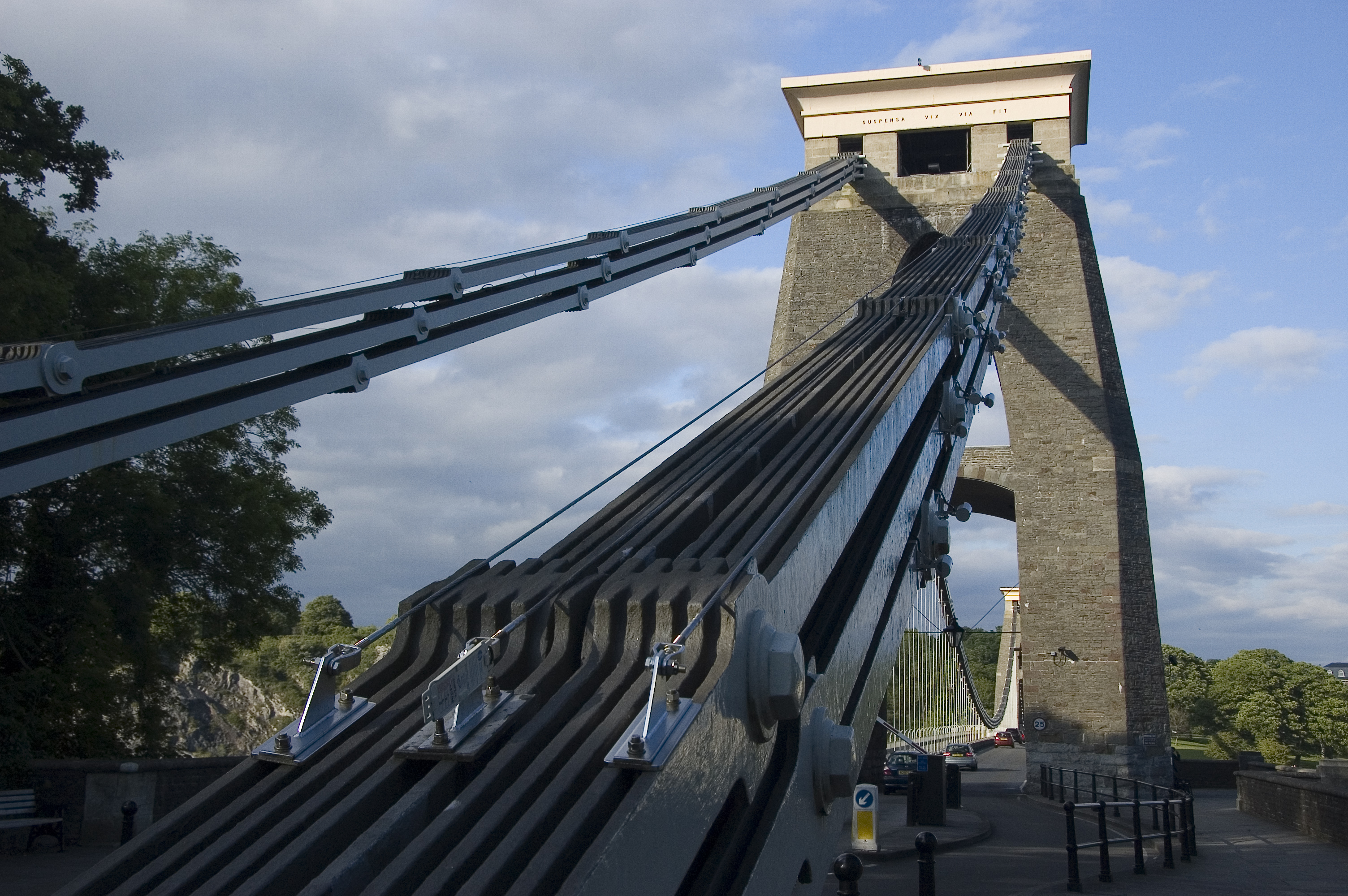
Detail view of the Clifton Bridge

=== Trusses: roofs and buildings ===
Eyebars are used in portions of pin-jointed trusses where it can be established by engineering procedures that the bar will not be imposed with any stress other than tension under all expected conditions. Eyebars are used to supplement roof truss framing supports made of wood or metal. They are placed as the struts for the truss, located next to the king joist.

=== Chain link suspension spans ===
Eyebar links have long been used in suspension bridges with a number of eyebar links combed together to form a highly redundant structure. This use of eyebar places it in a chain linkage that is holding a load based on tension rather than compression. However, more modern low-redundancy chain link suspension spans fell into general disfavor as a result of the collapse of the Silver Bridge in 1967, which led to the deaths of 46 people.

(The current method of suspension bridge design is to use multiple strands of drawn wire to form substantial cables.)

== Fabrication ==
Eyebars may be cast, forged, or cut from rolled plate. If round stock is used the eyes will usually be forged. Heat treatment (heating and rapid cooling) will result in a fine-grained microscopic crystal structure, enhancing the strength of the bar. Excessive hardness may induce brittleness, which should be avoided. The pins used to join bars will also be heat treated, usually to a degree of hardness exceeding that of the bars so that they will not shear under high stress.

=== Piling ===
Original eyebars were formed from "piling" thin iron metal on top of one another and forging it together in a furnace. Once together the piece was heated and hammered into a U shape over a die. To create the eye the heated bent iron was hammered into itself closing the gap and creating the eye shape. This method created a quick and efficient way to create the bar, however would not structurally stay together after a certain point due to the piling method being ill heated or being defective.

=== Casting ===
Piling was superseded by casting, wherein the eye and the bar are cast together in the same mold, creating a more sound piece with less area for the bond to break apart.

Newer methods of steel cutting such as laser, plasma, and water-jetting allow the production of steel items such as eyebars from prefabricated steel plates:

==== Laser ====
A strong laser is used to accurately cut a programmed design from steel. This method is quick and reduces waste, but also requires additional sanding and finishing before use.

==== Plasma ====
Oxygen gas, funneled past an electrode, creates an arc, which can be channeled down into steel allowing the metal to be cut. This method for cutting only works on conductive metals.

==== Water-jet ====
Similar to the laser, water-jet cutting utilizes a cutting machine but uses the force of water to cut through the steel. Using water creates smoothed near-finished cuts lowering production time.

== Advantages of use ==
Eyebars were created during the early 1900s where the cost of steel was high. The creation of the eyebar provided a simple solution to lessening the amount of steel needed in a bridge. Using a pin and eye method less stress would theoretically be placed on the joining members.

== Problems in use ==
Issues occur for the following reasons:

=== Improper fabrication ===
A bar may not be made properly due to bad casting, if steel, or not being hammered properly, if iron. This error is evident in points where the head has snapped off from the bar or the head has cracked across from a pin hole to the exterior side.

=== Insufficient redundancy ===
When a small number of eyebars serve as supports in bridges, the failure of one eyebar may overload the remaining ones. For example, the Silver Bridge failed because a chain contained only two eyebars paired together. When one failed, the load on the remaining eyebar was so high that it also failed, causing the bridge to collapse. It was more common practice to use four eyebars pinned together. If one eyebar failed, the other three would split the load, making a catastrophic failure less likely.

=== General wear ===
Like all metal, steel wears down over time. As a result, the steel pins in the eyes become loose and lose tension, which in turn compromises the integrity of the structure.

== Review of eyebar use ==
Due to the technological advancements in creating eyebars, iron and old cast method of steel eyebars are less common. These older bridges however still need to be maintained and reviewed. Researchers like Dewey Walls Jr. of the Union Pacific Railroad have compiled resources on how to review, identify compromised locations and how to properly repair the area.

== Notable suspension bridges documented by HAER ==
Name	ID	Date	Significance
Three Sisters Bridges	HAER PA-490-A	1926	Example of Large Eyebar Suspension Bridge
Brooklyn Bridge	HAER NY-18	1883	Once largest spanning bridge in the world, has eyebar anchors
Dresden (Ohio) Suspension Bridge	HAER OH-93	1914	One of the few examples of Eyebar Suspension Bridge

== See also ==
- List of bridges documented by the Historic American Engineering Record in Pennsylvania
