= Music (disambiguation) =

Music is an art form consisting of sound and silence, expressed through time.

Music may also refer to:

== In music ==
- Musical notation, a system for writing musical sounds with their pitch, rhythm, timing, volume, and tonality
- Sheet music, paper with printed or written musical notation on it

=== Albums ===
- Music (311 album), 1993
- Music (Music album), 1971
- Music (Carole King album), 1972
- Music (Erick Sermon album), 2001
- Music (Girugamesh album), 2008
- Music (Madonna album), 2000
- Music (Mika Nakashima album), 2005
- Music (Windsor Airlift album), 2013
- Music (Playboi Carti album), 2025
- Music – Songs from and Inspired by the Motion Picture, a 2021 album by Sia to accompany her musical film Music
- Musics (album), by Dewey Redman, 1978

=== Songs ===
- "Music" (Erick Sermon song), 2001
- "Music" (John Miles song), 1976
- "Music" (JoJo song), 2016
- "Music" (Madonna song), 2000
- "Music" (Sakanaction song), 2013
- "Music" (Underscores song), 2025
- "Music", by Darude from the 2003 album Rush
- "Music", by Exile from the 1985 album Hang On to Your Heart
- "Music", by Helloween from the 1993 album Chameleon
  - "Music", covered by Masterplan on the 2017 album PumpKings
- "Music", by Kelsea Ballerini from the 2017 album Unapologetically
- "Music", by Nightwish from the 2020 album Human. :II: Nature.
- "Music", by Petula Clark from the 1965 album Downtown
- "Music", by September from the 2011 album Love CPR
- "Music", by Sia from the 2021 album Music – Songs from and Inspired by the Motion Picture
- "Music", by Witchfinder General from the 2003 album Friends of Hell

== Art ==
- Music (Gosławski), a sculptural group by Józef, Wanda and Stanisław Gosławski
- Music (Kahlich), a sculpture by Karl Kahlich

== Computing ==
- Music (app), Apple software
- Music (Xperia), Sony software
- MUSIC, a multi-simulation coordinator software for neuronal network simulators
- MUSIC-N, the first music programming language
- MUSIC/SP, Multi-User System for Interactive Computing/System Product (originally MUSIC: "McGill University System for Interactive Computing")
- Music (video game), a music creation tool

== Film and television ==
- Music (2008 film), a drama film by Juraj Nvota
- Music (2021 film), a musical film by Sia
- Music (2023 film), a drama film by Angela Schanelec
- Music, 2010 documentary by Andrew Zuckerman
- "Music", an episode of the television program ChuckleVision

== Media ==
- BBC Music
- BBC 6music, a British radio station
- CBC Music, a Canadian national radio network

== People ==
- Music (surname), found largely in the United States (includes a list of people with the name)
- Musić, a South Slavic surname found largely in Bosnia
- Mušič, a South Slavic surname found largely in Slovenia

== Other ==
- MUSIC (algorithm), a frequency estimation technique
- Music (horse), a British racehorse
- USS Music (SP-1288), a United States Navy patrol boat in commission from 1917 to 1918
- Wii Music, a 2008 video game for the Wii console

== See also ==
- The Music (disambiguation)
- Musick (disambiguation)
- Musik (disambiguation)
- Muzik (disambiguation)
- Musica (disambiguation)
- Musical (disambiguation)
