= Musick (surname) =

Musick is the surname of the following notable people:

- Archie Musick (1902–1978), American painter
- Edwin Musick (1894–1938), American airline pilot and aviation world record holder
- Jack Musick (c. 1925 – 1977), American football player and coach
- Jim Musick (1910–1992), American footballer
- John R. Musick (1849–1901), American historical novelist and poet
- Pat Musick (born 1949), American voice actress
- Ruth Ann Musick (1897–1974), American author and folklorist
