= West Virginia folklore =

Folklore in the US state of West Virginia

West Virginia folklore includes folktales, legends, and superstitions, and was influenced by the culture of migrants who moved there in the late 19th and early 20th centuries.

== Origins ==
As the mining and railroad industries in West Virginia grew from the mid-1800s through the early 1900s, the demand for workers also increased. West Virginia became a magnet for immigrants of diverse backgrounds. One group that began to flock to the state was natives of Asturias, Spain, a mountainous region in northwestern Spain where many were employed by the zinc and coal mining industries. This principality was already geographically similar to Appalachia, and when two zinc plants opened in Harrison County (north central WV), Spanish laborers began to flock to the area. A small company town called Spelter was established in 1910, and just 10 years later, over a thousand Spanish immigrants inhabited it. This accounted for approximately two thirds of the state’s net Spanish population.

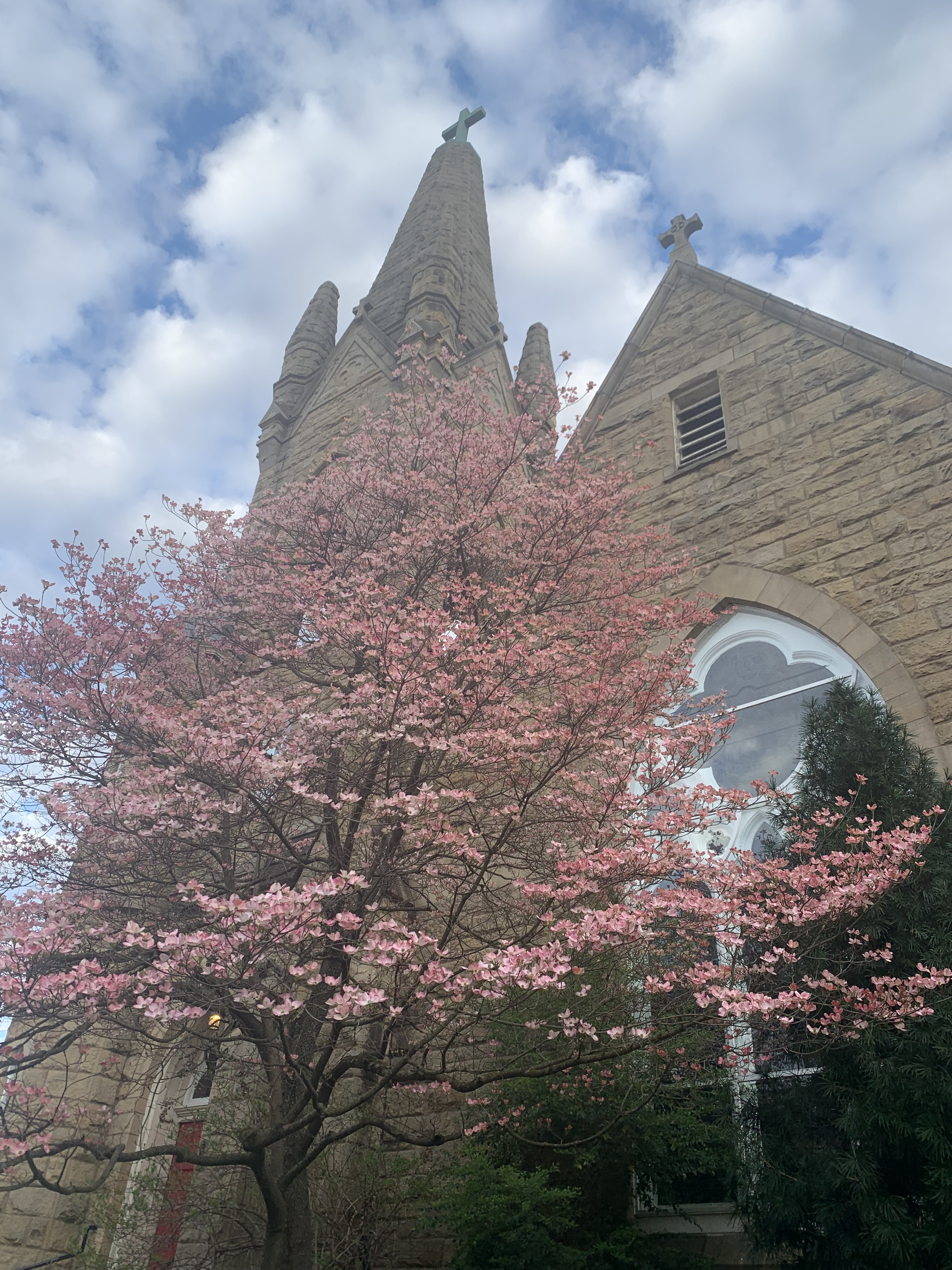
A flowering dogwood tree outside of St. John's Episcopal Church in Charleston, WV.

During this time, West Virginia also attracted migrants from Italy, Scandinavia, Ireland, Scotland, Germany, the Netherlands, Russia, Hungary, and the Levant region of the Middle East. A large Polish community established itself in Wheeling, while many Levantine immigrants flocked to more southern areas near Charleston, WV.

In just a few decades, West Virginia became a melting pot for all sorts of ethnicities, religions, languages, and cultures. Although many immigrant families have assimilated into American culture over the several generations that have passed since, West Virginia still maintains a culture of folklore and mystery today.

== Folktales ==
=== Old Raw-Head and Bloody Bones ===
Many variations of a child-eating creature known as "Rawhead," "Bloody Bones," or a combination of the two have existed in North American folktales for centuries. The earliest known recording of this boogeyman was in 1693 by none other than the English philosopher John Locke. It's believed that the stories originated in Great Britain, but spread to the United States where they became especially popular in the South. Some versions of the legend depict Bloody Bones as a water demon that haunted lakes and rivers. This was likely a means of keeping children away from deep bodies of water. Another version claims that he is an evil spirit attracted by violence and carnage. The Bloody Bones popular in West Virginian folklore, however, is a creature that inhabits the space under the stairs of a home and eats disobedient or misbehaving children. A tale of a child's encounter with Bloody Bones was recorded by Ninevah Jackson Willis. Willis is responsible for the compilation of many myths and superstitions native to Appalachia. This particular tale was used as a bedtime story for children. His account details the story of a young girl whose parents frequently left her home alone. One night, she became lonely while her parents were gone, so she stood beside the stairs and called for someone to come play with her. The girl received a response: a small voice assuring her that it would come soon. Over the course of the night, the girl called for company several more times. Finally, the voice replied that it was coming. Suddenly, a depiction of Rawhead rolled down the stairs, stopping by the girl's feet. Rawhead and the girl then exchange a series of interactions strongly reminiscent of the popular tale Little Red Riding Hood. The girl remarks on what long fingernails and big teeth the creature has. At the mention of its teeth, Rawhead slyly replies that they are "to eat [her] up with." The story then cuts to when the girl's parents arrive back home to find the girl's remains—a pile of bloody bones.

=== Where's My Big Toe? ===
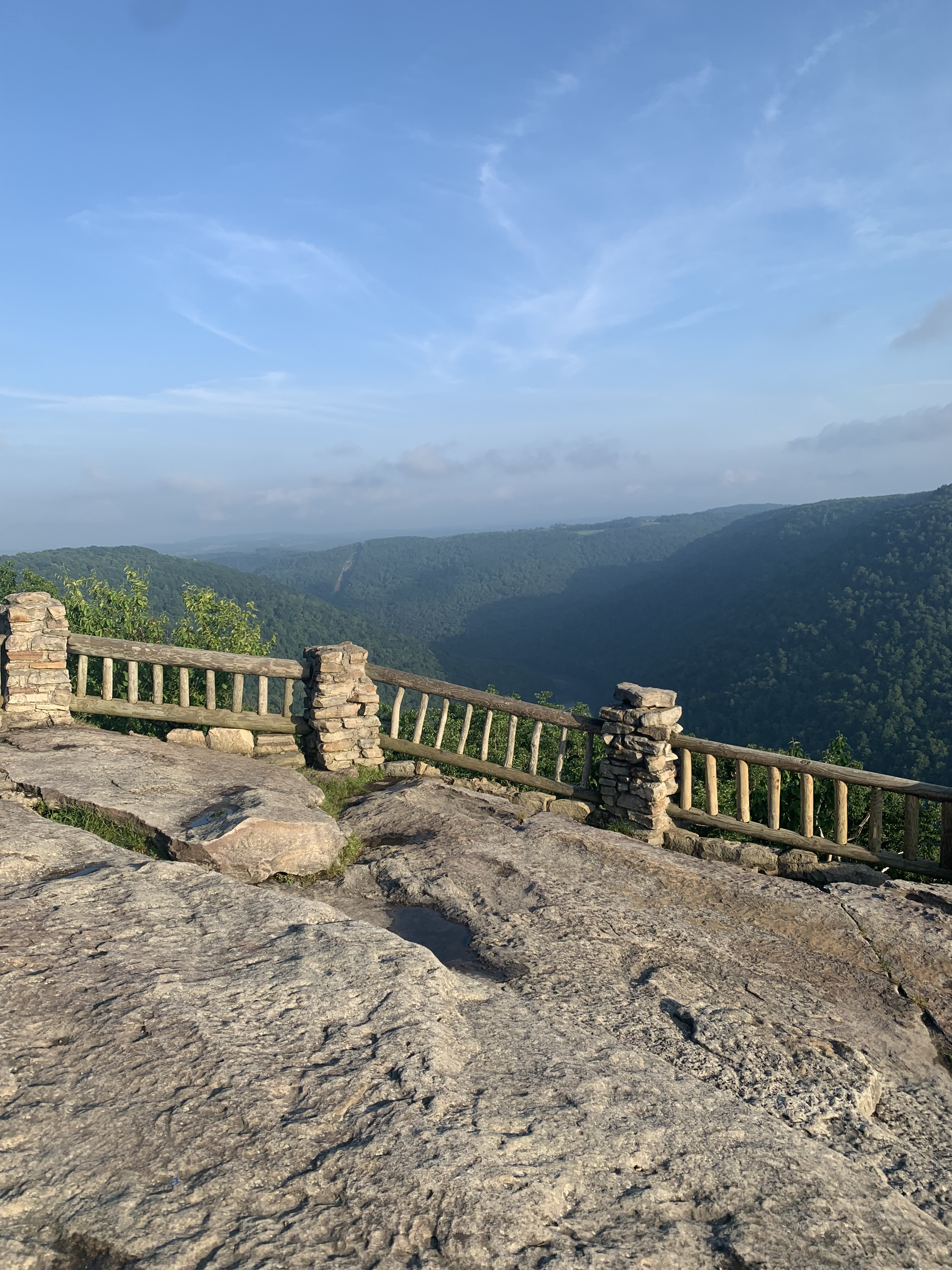
The overlook at Cooper's Rock State Park in Morgantown, WV.

Known by many names an adaptations, such as "The Hairy Toe" or "The Skinny Toe", "Where's My Big Toe?" is a story that has drifted through American folktales for years. The most modern and popular of these adaptations is simply known as "The Big Toe." It was included in the first book of Alvin Schwartz's highly popular Scary Stories to Tell in the Dark series, originally published in 1981. In Schwartz's version, a boy finds a toe while digging in his garden. He pulls it out and brings it inside to show his mother, who is quite impressed with its plumpness. She put it in the soup and the family ate it for dinner that evening. As the boy lay in bed that night, he heard a raspy voice repeatedly asking where its toe went. The boy was afraid and hid under his covers, hoping the voice would go away by morning. Rather than disappearing, the voice seemed to come closer and closer. At this point, the teller of the story is to pause, then cry "you've got it!" as they lunge towards the audience. The much older Appalachian version of the story has a fair share of similarities to this adaptation. Rather than a young boy, the person who discovers the toe is an old woman. Instead of taking the toe into the house to eat for dinner, the woman acts in more disregard as she tosses it over the fence and continues going about her gardening. The storylines become almost identical at this point as the woman hears a menacing voice asking for its toe as she is drifting off to sleep. The voice gets closer and closer, then, just like Schwartz's version, the storyteller pauses and scares the audience.

=== Angel of Mercy ===
The “Angel of Mercy” is a folktale told to show that deceased loved ones watch over and take care of their living descendants.

It was a cold winter, the roads were covered in snow over 2 feet (0.61 m) deep. One neighbor's wife had died, but the only way to get a coffin for her was to walk through the impassible roads to town and bring one back by yoked oxen. The family had placed their wife’s and mother's corpse in the snow and set out to town with the neighbors to get her a coffin. Once they got the coffin and were heading back towards their houses, it had gotten too cold to maintain their speed. Both the people and the oxen had slowed down so much that they had thought that they were not going to make it back to the house that night. Then a light began to come towards them. A woman held the light and, without speaking, led them back to the house. When they arrived at the house, in the reflection of the glass, someone saw the woman’s face and recognized her as the woman who had passed. Later, the family went back to where the corpse had been laid in the snow. Surely enough, her body was still there, dead as ever.

=== One Time ===
In the 19th and 20th century, it was standard to start stories by saying "once upon a time." But if you wanted to get an audience's attention, you started with "one time," as it meant that it was not just published, but it was rather seen by someone's own two eyes. For example:

One time there was a mother, old and crazy, who did not want her baby anymore. She decided to take her child behind an old barn, held it by its heels and bashed its brains onto a rock. It is said that if you go out there after midnight, you will hear the poor baby cry, and you can see the indent on the rock where it was murdered.

The story was told this way to give readers the feeling that they are present in the moment, hearing the baby's cries and feeling the discomfort and alarm as the story progresses. These "one time" stories aim to cultivate the reader's attention, having them search for something to come to life by the end of the story. They are designed to make the audience believe that the story is not a fiction one written for books, but that it is true, and the tale is being passed down generations.

== Legends ==
=== The Evil Eye ===
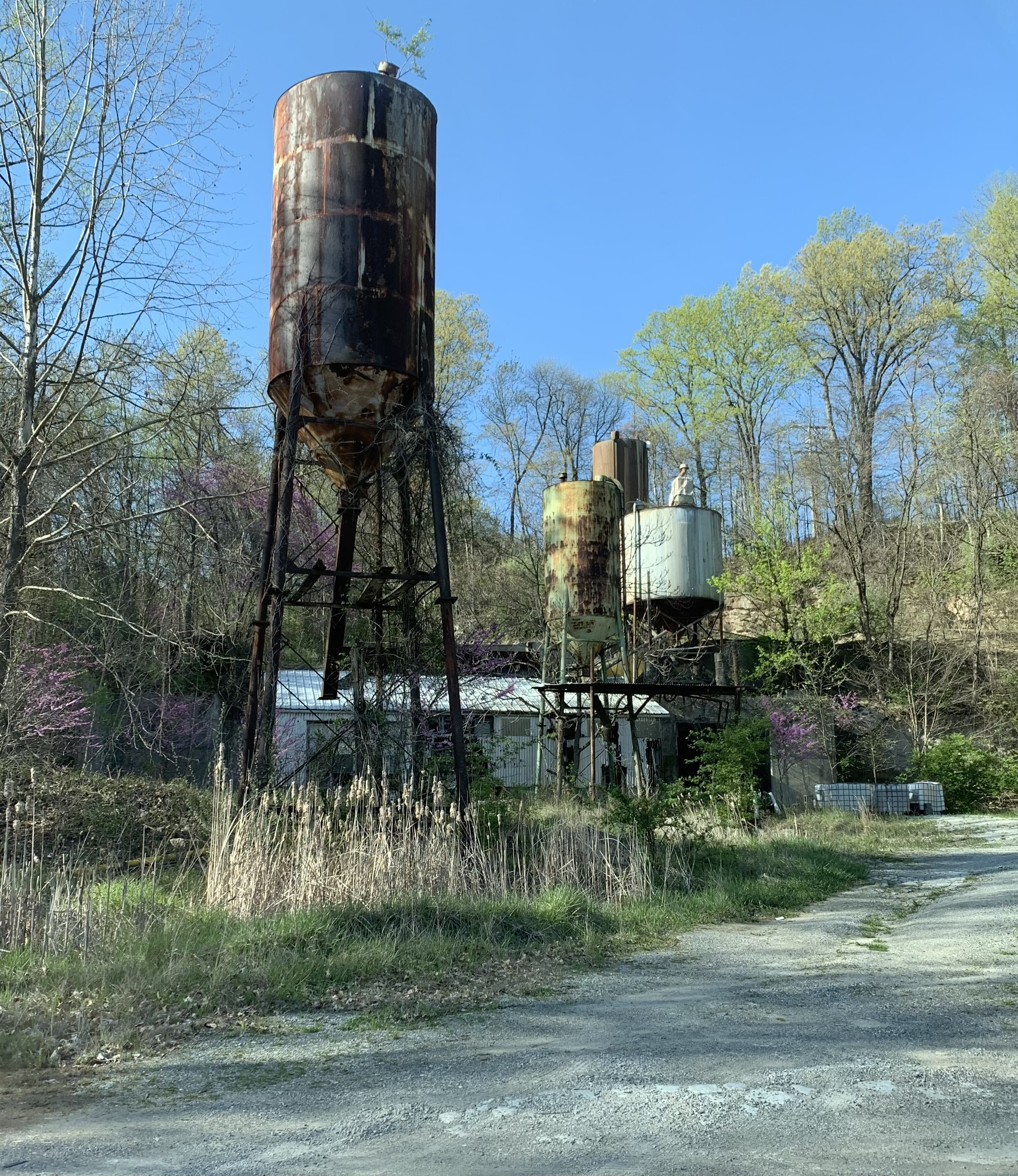
Abandoned infrastructure along a roadside in West Virginia.

In the late 19th and early 20th centuries, the dominant ethnicity of immigrants in West Virginia was Irish, but a few Italians trickled in as well. A popular tale stemming from Italy and passed down through the families of Italian immigrants was the legend of the evil eye. An evil eye is a type of spell or curse that can be cast intentionally or unintentionally, usually by a jealous relative or member of the community. When afflicted with the evil eye, one can suffer from migraines or become otherwise ill. Generally, the only way to cure an evil eye is for the person who cast it to confess and apologize. However, there are rare instances where a third party can provide a successful cure through a series of prayers and rituals, often involving olive oil. Olive oil is not only important to this legend as a potential cure. Another ritual involving olive oil is said to be able to reveal who cast the spell. This is convenient considering that, since evil eyes can be cast through jealous thoughts, the offender may not know they are responsible.

One reported story of the occurrence of an evil eye curse in West Virginia is a tale folklorist Ruth Ann Musick records as "The Beautiful Hair." In this story, a girl who has long and beautiful hair is envied by her friend. The friend asked if she could trim the girl's hair, and with persistence after an initial no, she was finally allowed to perform the task. Afterwards, the girl's friend kept the trimmings and she soon began to experience painful headaches. The girl and her family were baffled as no doctor or cure seemed to alleviate her pain. One day, the girl told her mother about the haircut. Upon hearing that the girl's friend had kept the trimmings, her mother suspected that her daughter was afflicted with the evil eye. The next day, the mother paid a visit to the friend's home, where she found a pot of boiling water on the stove containing her daughter's hair. The mother threw out the water and took the hair back from the pot. From that day on, her daughter never experienced a migraine again.

=== Tales of the Devil ===
Stories of the devil are popular in West Virginian folklore. Due to the variety of people and cultures in the state, there are many different depictions of the devil in regional legends. Some stories are told with him as a dapper young man, more utilize the classic tail-and-horns image, and others take a different approach all together. It's important to note that the devil sometimes serves a different role in these legends. Traditionally, the devil is known as a tempter and the master of all evil. While this is certainly a relevant narrative in West Virginian folklore, the devil can alternatively be depicted as an omen. This can be seen in the Legend of the White Raven Inn.

This story takes place in a small roadhouse near Keyser, WV during the 1950s. It's said that a crowd of about 30 patrons was enjoying their evening drinking and dancing. The party was quite "disorderly" as all in attendance were heavily intoxicated. According to eyewitness accounts, the devil allegedly came through the floor. He flew around the room for several moments, sparks flying as his tail hit one of the walls. Other than that, he said and did nothing, disappearing back through the floor just a few moments later. As the legend goes, every patron began attending church after this experience. They remained believers in God for the rest of their lives.

In another story, a man was deathly sick with typhoid fever. As the illness progressed, he began to shout about terrible things he claimed to see. His primary concern was the black dog that he claimed was under the bed. The neighbors who were taking caring of him attributed this to his delirious state of mind, as the man did not own a dog. However, as he became more persistent, his caretakers finally looked under the bed. To their disbelief, a massive creature resembling a dog was in fact under the bed, taking up its full length. The man screamed that they must remove the dog. His neighbors did everything they could to get rid of the dog, first attempting to lure it out, then by physically attacking it. Nothing they did worked. Eerily enough, the dog not only didn't move, but never even made a sound. Meanwhile, the man continued to scream and writhe in pain. This was distressing to the neighbors, so they decided to step outside for a while. When they came back, the man was dead and the dog was gone.

Another way the devil has been depicted in legends is as an almost ordinary man. In a story native to Wetzel County of northern WV, a girl is confronted by a young man who prompts her to sign a book in her own blood. The girl refused after glancing at the man's feet and seeing that they were cloven hooves, a telltale sign of the devil. In contrast, some legends perceive the devil as completely inhuman such (i.e. a ball of fire with glowing eyes). Such is the case in a tale passed down the generations from Ruth Ann Musick's great grandfather, who, as a teenager, skipped church one Sunday to go riding on his horse. After night fell, he passed through a cemetery, where he was confronted with this version of the devil. He was scared out of his mind, and vowed to never miss church again. This also serves as an example of how the devil can sometimes be depicted as an omen.

=== Witches ===
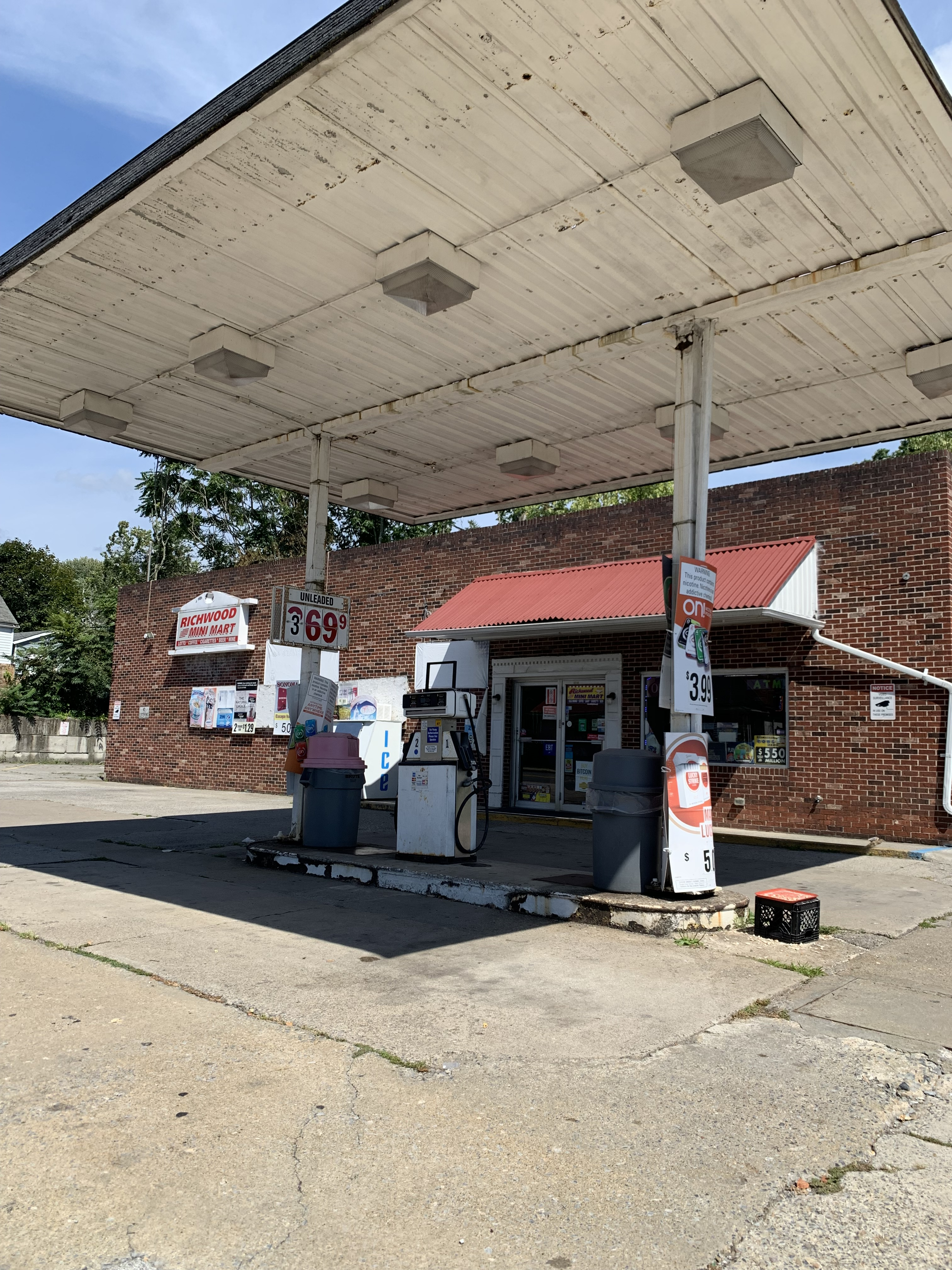
Richwood Mini Mart in Morgantown, WV.

The practice of witchcraft, or suspicions of it, both malign and beneficial, was common in early West Virginia. Magic was an explanation for otherwise unexplainable phenomena. If a child fell ill and could not be treated by a doctor, sorcery was blamed. Alleged witch doctors traveled the region, lifting curses and defeating evil. One such doctor was known as Jesse Bayles. Bayles and his family settled in Northern West Virginia near the border of Pennsylvania. He considered himself an enemy to "all who practiced evil magic."

The art of witchcraft could be taught and passed through generations. Jesse Bayle taught what he knew to his son Aden, but Aden did not pass the knowledge on to any of his children. Another example of magic being taught occurred in Monongah, a small mining town located in Marion County, WV. A reclusive Hungarian woman was supposed to be a witch by her neighbors due to her fixation on dolls and old Hungarian superstitions. One day, a curious little girl asked if the woman could teach her to cast spells. The old lady put the girl through various tests, then told her to return in a couple of days. When the girl came back, she found the woman lying dead. Next to her was a doll with a pin through its heart. This seems to allude to voodoo, which was not a common form of magic practiced in the region. As for the little girl, it's said that she acquired magical powers which she kept for the rest of her life.

Besides causing harm to others or healing, those who practiced magic were sometimes said to be able to tell the fortunes of others. This was usually through the use of cards, and on some occasions, the bottom of a coffee mug was utilized as well. One such account was published in the Goldenseal Magazine in 1995 by the daughter of one whose fortune was told. The woman's mother was named Margaret Rogers. Margaret's great aunt Adeline (also known as Ad) was described as "proficient in the ways of mountain life." One night, she told the fortunes of a couple of her nieces. When she made it to Margaret, it's said that she became unusually serious in her tone. She proceeded to predict very specific details of Margaret's future, including a description of her future husband, house, and financial situation. All of these predictions later came true.

However convincing tales of Appalachian witchcraft may appear, it's more likely that these witches were just ordinary men and women who had learned to utilize their strange appearance or eccentric personality as a means of financial gain.

=== Lovers' Leap ===
Lovers Leap is a story similar to Romeo and Juliet. It is about a young Indian of the Cherokee tribe who was out on his first hunt after becoming a man. He went out to a valley with the rest of the men from his tribe. They all split up during the day and the new man travelled further from the camp than he should have. While away, he saw a young girl on the ridge above him. The young girl was of the Shawnee tribe. They saw each other every day while on the hunt. Finally the young man desired to hunt a deer more than anything, but apparently Cupid drew his bow faster which then struck the young Cherokee man. The young Cherokee and Shawnee fell in love and spent much more time together that season. One day, the father of the girl caught them and began to drag his daughter away. He told her he could never see someone of the Cherokee tribe, but instead of parting ways, the young Shawnee girl ran to her lover and leaped into his arms. Together, they jumped off the precipice and met their premature demise in the jagged bottom. To this day, that precipice is still called Lovers Leap.

=== The Helpful Ghost ===
This legend comes from the Scottish-Irish settlers of West Virginia. It tells of a sick young boy with only one possible cure: an herb grown by a nearby swamp. The boy's father set out to go look for the herb to save his son. As he searched the swamp grounds, he felt that he was not alone. He felt that as he walked faster, it followed faster. When he walked slower, it followed slower. Eventually, the father felt as though the presence were so close that it was breathing down his neck. He looked up and was shocked to see a headless figure. Perhaps even more shocking was that the figure perfectly resembled that of his great grandfather's. The apparent ghost seemed to want to help, even take the lead in the search for the herb. After it led the father to the middle of the swamp, he was shocked to find the exact herb he had been searching for. He dug up the herb and the ghostly figure led him home. The father arrived home just in time to save his son.

== Superstitions ==
The prevalence of superstition in West Virginia largely came with the settlement of Irish and Scottish immigrants in the region. Belief in mythical faeries was a common Celtic belief, and although much of this culture faded with time, many related superstitions remained. Some examples of persisting superstitions are listed as follows:

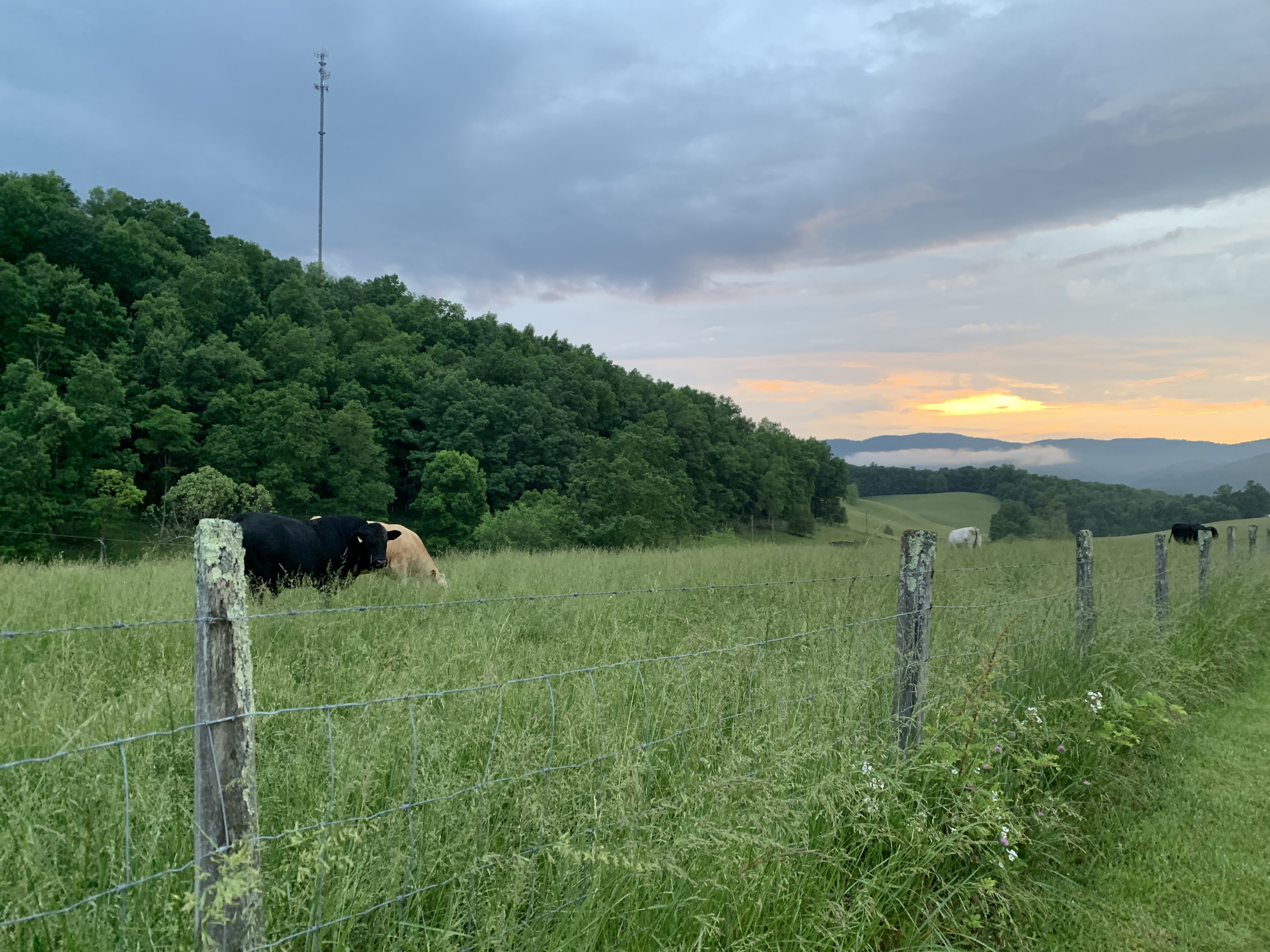
Cows grazing on a field in Beverly, WV.

- If one swallows a live minnow backwards, they will be less susceptible to the whooping cough.
- To keep witches away and harbor good luck, one is to keep a buckeye in their pocket.
- For a sharper shot, one should tie a hair from their left armpit to a groove they carve in a bullet.
- To break a bewitchment, shoot a picture of the witch with a silver bullet.
- If the hem of one's dress is turned up, they can make a wish by kissing it and turning it back down.
- To prevent a dog from running away, take hair from its tail and bury it under the front door step.
- Count 10 stars for 10 nights in a row to dream of the person one will marry.
- A dog that rolls on its back means that someone will die before the sun sets.
- If one opens an umbrella indoors, someone will die. The one who opened it will die if they put it over their head.
- To cross a black cat is bad luck.
- A bird that flies into a house foretells the death of someone in the household.
- Moths are deceased loved ones coming back to visit.
- A chill up the spine means that someone has walked over the ground that one will be buried in.
- Sweeping a floor at night, especially through a doorway, brings bad luck.
- To rock an empty rocking chair is bad luck.
- If a rag is dropped on the floor, it foretells the visitation of someone unclean.
- A young woman can discover who she will marry by eating a thimble full of salt then walking backwards without speaking.

Many superstitions focused on the curing of certain ailments or spotting omens of death. Folk medicine through superstition is largely obsolete in the modern era, but the myths remain strong. Like other forms of legends and folklore, superstitions are often passed down through oral storytelling. Through the 1950s, this storytelling could stem from the mouths of town elders or "solid citizens". Presently, these beliefs are largely passed down intergenerationally by older family members such as grandparents.

== Significance in popular culture ==
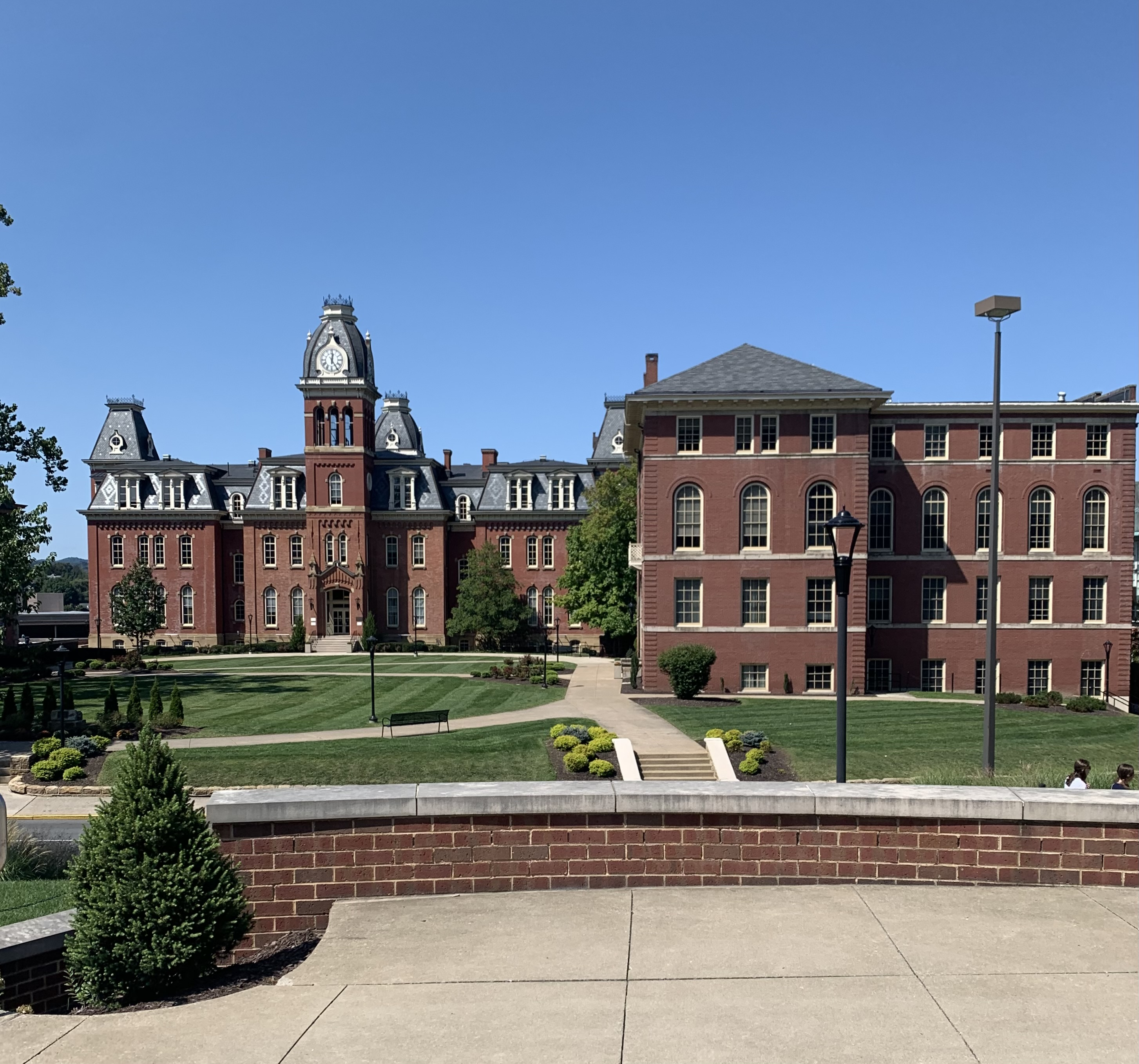
Woodburn Hall at West Virginia University in Morgantown, WV.

It is evident that West Virginians are self aware of their own rich culture. As early as the 20th century, mentions of folklore can be found in local newspaper articles. A 1916 edition of the Martinsburg Herald wrote about the founding of the West Virginia Folklore Society, an organization which is still active today. Another newspaper article published in the same year details a meeting of the West Virginia University Women's Club where they asked the folklore society to create a collection of ghost stories to be shared during one of their meetings. Yet another testament to Appalachians' awareness of their own culture is seen in 1963 as an article in The Republican advertises a festival that will feature aspects of local folklore.

== Creatures and beings ==
This list of West Virginia folklore creatures and beings.

Name	Location	Description	Size	Reference(s)
Flatwoods Monster	Flatwoods, West Virginia	A tall, humanoid figure with a spade-shaped head, glowing eyes, and a metallic, skirt-like lower body.	10 feet (3.0 m)	
Grafton monster	Grafton, West Virginia	A large, headless, hulking creature with smooth, seal-like skin.	7–9 feet (2.1–2.7 m)	
Indrid Cold	Point Pleasant, West Virginia	A humanoid entity, claiming extraterrestrial origin, with an inhumanly large smile.	6 feet (1.8 m)	
Mothman	Point Pleasant, West Virginia	A large winged moth-like or owl-like humanoid with glowing red eyes.	7 feet (2.1 m)	
Ogua	Rivesville, West Virginia	A 500-pound (230 kg) creature that is said to resemble an unusually large alligator snapping turtle.	20 feet (6.1 m)	
Sheepsquatch	Boone County, West Virginia	A large, woolly, bipedal sheep-like creature with sharp horns, fangs, and clawed hands.	9 feet (2.7 m)	
Snallygaster	Scrabble, West Virginia	A dragon-like creature with massive wings, a sharp beak, and tentacles.	10 feet (3.0 m)	
Snarly Yow	Harpers Ferry, West Virginia	A huge wolf-like creature with glowing eyes and a long, shaggy mane.	6 feet (1.8 m)	
Vegetable Man	Grant Town, West Virginia	A tall, humanoid creature covered in green foliage with a vegetable-like head and leafy limbs.	7 feet (2.1 m)	
