= Musica =

Musica (Latin), or La Musica (Italian) or Música (Portuguese and Spanish) may refer to:

== Music ==
=== Albums ===
- Musica è, a mini album by Italian funk singer Eros Ramazzotti 1988
- Musica, an album by Ghaleb 2005
- Musica (Giovanni album)), a German album by Giovanni 2008
- Musica (Paolo Meneguzzi album), an album by Paolo Meneguzzi 2007
- Musica, an album by Pepito Bueno and Badal Roy 2000
- Musica, an album by WalFredo Vargas 2001
- Musica, an album by Paulinho da Viola 2005
- Musica <3, an album by Junior H, 2020
- La música, a Spanish album by Mocedades 1900

=== Songs ===
- "Musica", an Italian song by Air 2003
- "Música", a Spanish song by Al Bano, 1968
- "Musica", an Italian song by Angelo Branduardi 1981
- "Musica" (Gemelli Diversi), a song by Gemelli Diversi 2000
- "Música", a song by Il Divo on Siempre 2006
- "Musica", an English song by Fantastique, 1982
- "Musica "(Fly Project), an English-language single by Fly Project 2012
- "Musica", a French song by Pierre Kartner 1984
- "Música", a Spanish song by Lucerito, 1985
- "Musica" (Paolo Meneguzzi), 2007
- "Musica", an Italian song by Mina from album Kyrie, Vol. 1
- "Musica", an Italian song by New Trolls, Belleno, D'Adamo, Di Palo, Belloni, De Scalzi 1980
- "Música", a Spanish song by Pérez Prado
- "Musica", an Italian song by Stefano Ruffini, 1989
- "Música", a Spanish song by Paloma San Basilio
- "La Musica", a French song written by Patrick Juvet 1973

=== Other uses in music ===
- Musica (company), a Scandinavian record label
- Musica (French music festival), a music festival Strasbourg
- Musica (retailer), a South African music and film DVD retailer.
- MUSICA, a Japanese music magazine
- Musica Records, a jazz record label
- Musica Studios, an Indonesian music company
- La Musica (music festival), Sarasota, Florida

== Other ==
- Música (2024 film), a film by Rudy Mancuso
- Musica (sculpture), a 2003 sculpture by Alan LeQuire
- Musica universalis, an ancient philosophical concept
- Phillip Musica (1877–1938), Italian swindler
- La Musica (film), a 1967 film directed by Marguerite Duras
- La Musica, a 1965 play by Marguerite Duras
- La Musica, a character in the opera L'Orfeo
- Musica (Aaltonen sculpture), a 1926 sculpture by Wäinö Aaltonen
- 18 Delphini, a star named Musica
- MSC Musica, a cruise ship

== See also ==
- Music (disambiguation)
- Musical (disambiguation)
