= Grafton monster =

Modern urban legend

Grafton Monster
Creature information
- Other name: Grafton monster
- Grouping: West Virginia cryptid

Origin
- First attested: 1964
- Region: Grafton, West Virginia

In West Virginia folklore, the Grafton Monster is a massive creature with an atypical anatomy allegedly spotted around Grafton, West Virginia, in 1964.

== History ==
Around 11:00 p.m. on June 16, 1964, Grafton Sentinel reporter Robert Cockrell spotted a mysterious figure along Riverside Drive just outside of Grafton near the Tygart Valley River. The creature stood at a height of 7 to 9 feet (2.1 to 2.7 m) and possessed white fur, though it ostensibly lacked a noticeable head. Following this alleged encounter, Cockrell was reportedly eager to write an article about the creature, but the editors of the paper initially rejected his story, deeming it unbelievable. Other sources claiming similar encounters ultimately led the news outlet to relent and permit Cockrell to publish his article. Following the publication of Cockrell’s piece, a number of individuals came forward with their own claims, leading to widespread interest and local investigations.

== Explanations ==
Though it was argued at the time that an escaped polar bear might be responsible, a letter reportedly submitted by Cockrell in 2014 to the Mountain Statesman clarified his theory about what had happened. According to the letter, Cockrell had indeed witnessed an unusual shape on the side of the road, but claimed that several details had been erroneously added during retellings over time. He proposed that a cyclist named Tommy Peters, who was known in the area, was carrying a stack of boxes on the back of his bicycle that night and it likely led to a misidentification.

== Legacy ==
In 2024, the inaugural Grafton Monster Festival was held, a two-day event in June to celebrate the eponymous monster as well as greater West Virginia folklore. Festival organizer Kit Ford deemed the festival to be a good economic opportunity for the town. This also included the soft launch of the Grafton Monster Museum, located on Main Street. In 2026, the Grafton Monster was featured on a new West Virginia state license plate.

== Popular culture ==
- From 2014–2022, the Grafton monster was the main focus of five different episodes of the television show Mountain Monsters.
- In 2018, the Grafton Monster was featured in the video game Fallout 76.
- In 2024, Michael Strayer and Ballyraven released their children’s book Curious Creatures: The Grafton Monster. This is the first official book completely dedicated to the Grafton Monster of West Virginia.

== See also ==
- Flatwoods monster
- List of West Virginia cryptids
