= Archie Musick =

American painter (1902–1978)

- Born: Archie Leroy Musick; 19 January 1902; Kirksville, Missouri
- Died: 8 April 1978 (aged 76); Colorado Springs, Colorado
- Education: Broadmoor Art Academy; Thomas Hart Benton; Art Students League of Los Angeles
- Known for: Painting, Illustrator
- Movement: Regionalist

Archie Leroy Musick (1902–1978) was an American painter. He studied under Thomas Hart Benton, Stanton Macdonald-Wright, and Boardman Robinson.

== Early life and family ==
Archie Musick was born on January 19, 1902, in Kirksville, Missouri, to parents Levi Prince Musick and Zada (Goeghegan) Musick. He attended Kirksville schools and later Northeast Missouri State Teachers College (now known as Truman State University). In 1947 he married Irene Kolodziej, who was head of the ceramics department at the University of Missouri Columbia, and they were the parents of two children, Patricia Ruth Musick and Daniel Barrett Musick. After Irene's death, he married Jane Wyeth Knight. Archie Musick was the brother of author and folklorist Ruth Ann Musick as well as the nephew of author John R. Musick.

== Career ==
His first major mural, "Hard Rock Miners," (1934, 5″×14″) was funded by the Public Works of Art Project and may be seen in the City Auditorium in Colorado Springs, Colorado, where for many years he was the art instructor at the Cheyenne Mountain School. Musick’s work can be seen as well in the Red Cloud, Nebraska, Post Office, the Manitou Springs, Colorado, post office; and his alma mater, Truman State University (B.Sc.; then Northeast Missouri State Teachers’ College). He was commissioned by the class of 1928 to paint the snow-covered ruins of Old Baldwin Hall, which was destroyed in a 1924 fire. He described his first private mural commissions (well before the New Deal-funded ones) as "scenic pot-boilers on restaurant walls, (which) were happily destroyed by fire." He spent most of his career in Colorado, with a year (1946-7) teaching at the University of Missouri and several years after that teaching at another Missouri university. The post office murals were funded by the New Deal Section of Painting and Sculpture program; the Red Cloud mural was painted in 1941, and the Manitou Springs one, "Hunters Red and White," in 1942. In the course of creating "Hunters Red and White," Archie developed the signature egg tempera/colored pencil technique that he used for smaller paintings throughout the rest of his life.

His book, Musick Medley: Intimate Memories of a Rocky Mountain Art Colony, is a personal view of the art world of the Colorado Springs region from the 1920s to the 1950s, including the Broadmoor Art Academy and Colorado Springs Fine Arts Center.

Musick also illustrated selected works for his sister, Ruth Ann Musick, collections The Telltale Lilac Bush and Other West Virginia Ghost Tales, Coffin Hollow and Other Ghost Tales, and Green Hills of Magic: West Virginia Folktales from Europe. Many of the original ink board illustrations from these publications are within the archives of Fairmont State University's West Virginia Folklife Center. Two enameled copper and steel murals incorporating many of Archie's illustrations (along with additional original illustrations to other tales) were created by his daughter, Pat Musick, when she was an Artist-in-Residence at FSU in 1992. The murals are on exhibit for public viewing in the foyer of the Ruth Ann Musick Library on the main campus.

== Sources ==
- Who Was Who in American Art. Compiled from the original thirty-four volumes of American Art Annual: Who's Who in Art, Biographies of American Artists Active from 1898 to 1947. Edited by Peter Hastings Falk. Madison, CT: Sound View Press, 1985. (WhAmArt 1)

== Writing ==
- Oil Painting for Beginners (1930)
- Jigger Flies First (juvenile; 1957)
- Transplanting Culture. Magazine of Art March, 1937
- Musick Medley: Intimate Memories of a Rocky Mountain Art Colony Colorado Springs: Jane and Archie Musick 1971.
