= Musick =

Musick is an old-fashioned spelling for music. It may refer to:

== Places ==
- Musick, West Virginia, an unincorporated community in the US
- Musick Point, the headland of a peninsula in New Zealand
- Musick Light, a lighthouse on Kanton Island, Kiribati, named after Edwin Musick
- James A. Musick Facility, a county jail in California, US
- Musick Guard Station, in western Oregon, US

== People ==
- Musick (surname)

== Music ==
- a 2026 album by Laibach

== See also ==
- Music (disambiguation)
- Musik (disambiguation)
- Muzik (disambiguation)
- Musicking
