= The Music (disambiguation) =

The Music are a British alternative rock band.

The Music may also refer to:

- The Music (album), their eponymous 2003 album
- The Music (film), a 1972 Japanese film by Yasuzo Masumura
- The Music (magazine), an Australian entertainment magazine
- The Music, a 1999 album by Radioinactive
- "The Music", a song by David Usher from his 2007 album Strange Birds
- "The Music" (Street Level Hero)

== See also ==
- Music (disambiguation)
