= Vegetable Man (hoax) =

Hoax promoted in West Virginia

Head and shoulders artist rendering of Jenning Frederick's claimed sighting

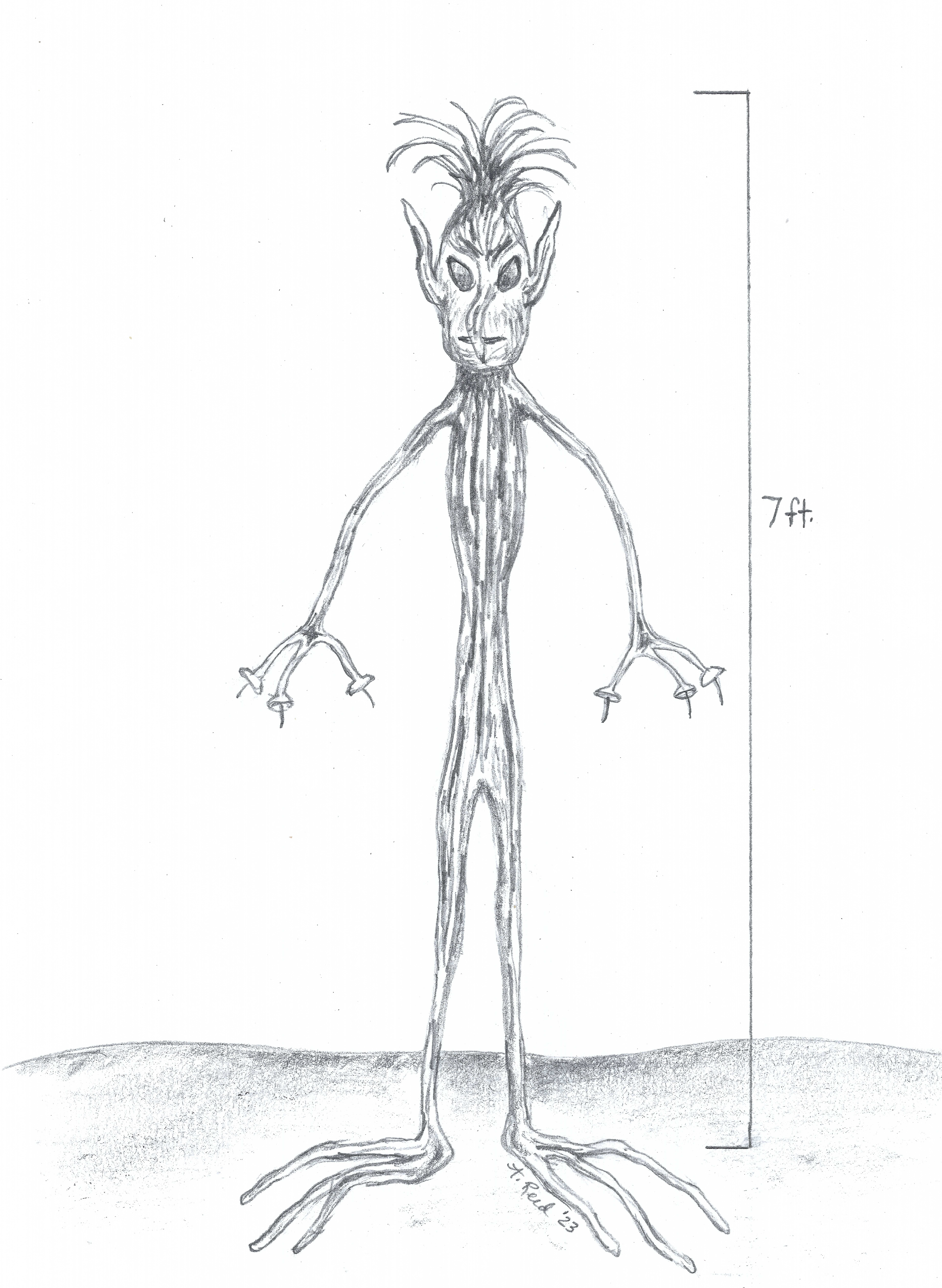
Full body rendering based on Frederick's claimed sighting

The Vegetable Man, also known as the Veggie Man, is a humanoid creature reportedly seen in Grant Town, West Virginia by local resident Jennings Frederick in 1968. The creature was first described in print by known hoaxer, Gray Barker in a 1976 newsletter, which characterized it as a thin, plant-like creature with yellow eyes, pointed ears, and fingers ending in needle-like suction cups. No evidence of the alleged sighting has been documented and there have been no subsequent claimed sightings of the creature.

== Frederick's claim ==
According to Frederick's account, in July 1968, he was hunting groundhogs near Grant Town when, after an unsuccessful hunt, he began walking home. While passing beneath a maple tree, he heard what he described as “'a high-pitched jabbering, much like that of a recording running at an exaggerated speed'”. He subsequently reported receiving a message from the creature, stating, "'You need not fear me. I wish to communicate. I come as friends. We know of you all. I come in peace. I wish medical assistance. I need your help!” The account does not clarify whether Frederick perceived the communication as an audible voice or as a telepathic message. He further claimed that his wrist was being held by a seven-foot-tall humanoid with extremely thin arms, which he described as "no bigger around than a quarter" and hands bearing three “seven-inch-long fingers with needle-like tips and suction cups”.

The creature gripped his wrist more and more tightly and extracted blood from Frederick who cried out in pain and fright. Its eyes, which had been yellow, became red. It "bolted up the hill, making 'great leaping jumps' that covered a distance of at least twenty-five feet per leap" and Frederick heard humming noises coming from the woods where it had sprung to. Assuming the creature was of extraterrestrial origin, he claimed the noises were from the saucer it may have arrived in. Frederick went home and feared no one would believe him so he told his family that his wounds were from briars in the woods. Months later he told this story to his friend Gray Barker.

Barker, who had written about UFO's and other paranormal stories, including coining the term "The Men in Black", was commonly known as a hoaxer and "was known to encourage individuals to fabricate stories", according to Reed. Barker wrote about the creature in a March 10th, 1976 article called "The Vegetable Man: A semi-abductee?", which appeared in The Gray Barker Newsletter. No other sightings of the Veggie Man have been reported.

According to researcher Daniel A. Reed writing for Skeptical Inquirer Magazine, years prior, in April 1965 when Frederick was at school, his mother Ivah Frederick told her son that she had seen a “'saucer shaped aircraft'” about ten feet in diameter and five feet in height. Tethered to the saucer was a small, unclothed, “'black or dark green colored creature'” that looked “'more animal, or even Satanic, than human,'” described as having “'pointed ears and a tail.'” Terrified, she hid under the covers of her bed until she got the courage to look out the window and saw the creature get into the saucer which buzzed and rotated away.

Son Frederick investigated and took plaster casts and hair samples from the tracks he found and photographed the area. Frederick sent all his evidence to "the U.S. Air Force for analysis and received in reply the “'inane explanation'” that the craft was a weather balloon, and the Air Force never returned the physical evidence to Frederick".

== Hoax ==
The Clarksburg-Harrison Public Library holds the "Gray Barker Collection", from which researcher Daniel Reed was able to collect information. Reed cites the Barker display at the library which states "Barker delighted in entertainment factor that could be found among the world of ufology. Barker was a well-known hoaxer .. and a collector of tales, rumors, reports, dreams and lies ... most, however, are exaggerations, distortions, or unadulterated fantasies'". Reporter Sam Gorski called the Veggie man story "a little-known hoax".

Reed writes that the entire story of the Vegetable Man, "rests on the testimony of one single eyewitness/victim whose only recorded report of the alleged incident was made to—and reported by—a known hoaxer". Adding that there is no physical evidence and with the amount of effort purportedly Frederick went to when documenting his mother's UFO and alien encounter, he didn't make any effort to document his own encounter.

== Legacy ==
Since 2024, Veggie Man Day has been hosted in Fairmont, West Virginia, to celebrate the Veggie man and creatures from West Virginia folklore.In 2026, Veggie Man was featured on a new West Virginia state license plate.

The Vegetable Man has been featured in the video game Fallout 76.

== See also ==
- Flatwoods monster
