= Musical =

Musical is the adjective of music.

Musical may also refer to:

- Musical theatre, a performance art that combines songs, spoken dialogue, acting and dance
- Musical film and television, a genre of film and television that incorporates into the narrative songs sung by the characters
- Musical isomorphism, the canonical isomorphism between the tangent and cotangent bundles

== See also ==
- Lists of musicals
- Music (disambiguation)
- Musica (disambiguation)
- Musicality, the ability to perceive music or to create music
