= Mountain Statesman =

- Type: Thrice-weekly newspaper
- Format: Broadsheet
- Owner(s): NCWV Media
- Publisher: Nicki Skinner
- Founded: 1870
- Headquarters: 914 West Main St Grafton, Taylor County, WV 26354
- Circulation: 1,710 (as of 2016)
- Website: mountainstatesman.com

The Mountain Statesman is a thrice-weekly newspaper serving the Grafton, West Virginia area. Its 2016 circulation was 1,710.

== History ==
The Statesman began its life as the Grafton Sentinel, a publication that was only weeks old when editor and publisher James W. Holt took it over in 1870. Holt, a 21 year old who had previously worked at the Preston County Journal, went through a series of partners but, aside from a short period of divestment from the paper in 1875, remained editor and publisher of the paper until 1893, and returned to the management of the paper after a short tenure as the county's postmaster.

As a staunchly Republican paper in a majority Democratic county, Holt's publication found surprising success. In 1903 Holt introduced the Daily Sentinel, an eight-page six column evening paper, to serve the growing city of Grafton. Holt continued as publisher and editor until three years before his death, handing control of the paper to his son Howard H. Holt in 1915. The younger son in turn passed it to his son, James F. Holt, on his death in 1936. James left the paper in 1948, selling it to Joseph Abey, a Pennsylvania publisher, after deciding to embark on a career in law.

In 1946, at the age of just 20, Eldora Nuzum became editor of the Sentinel. At the time of her death, multiple local sources identified her as the first female editor of a daily newspaper in West Virginia.

In the 1960s, the paper (and one of its reporters) were known for the Grafton monster sighting.

In 1975 the Sentinel ceased its daily publication schedule, changed its name to the Mountain Statesman, and moved to the three times a week schedule it uses today. The newspaper was bought by News Media Corporation in the early 1970s. The company sold the newspaper in 2022 to NCWV Media.

== Resources ==
- List of newspapers in West Virginia
