= Snallygaster =

Legendary creature from American folklore

The snallygaster is a bird-reptile chimera originating in the folklore of early German immigrants who settled in the region of what is now Frederick County, Maryland. In the early 20th century, legends of the Snallygaster were revived through sensationalistic newspaper reports that alleged the existence of a creature which was said to bear its general likeness. Early sightings led to a particular association with the Frederick County areas of South Mountain, Braddock Heights, and the Middletown Valley. Later reports would expand to encompass an area that included Central Maryland, Berkeley County in West Virginia, and the Washington, D.C., metro area.

== History ==
=== 18th century ===
The area of Frederick County, Maryland, was settled by German immigrants beginning in the 1730s. Early accounts describe the community being terrorized by a monster called a Schneller Geist, meaning "quick ghost" in German. The earliest incarnations of the creature mixed the half-bird features of a siren with the nightmarish features of demons and ghouls. The snallygaster was described as being half-reptile and half-bird, possessing a metallic beak lined with razor-sharp teeth. It was also said to have octopus-like tentacles. The snallygaster was rumored to swoop silently from the sky to pick up and carry off its victims. The earliest stories claim that this monster sucked the blood of its victims. Seven-pointed stars, which reputedly kept the snallygaster at bay, can still be seen painted on local barns.

=== 19th century ===
It has been speculated the legend was resurrected in the 19th century to frighten freed African-Americans.

=== 20th century ===
Newspaper accounts throughout February and March 1909 describe encounters between local residents and a beast with "enormous wings, a long pointed bill, claws like steel hooks, and an eye in the center of its forehead." It was described as making screeches "like a locomotive whistle". A great deal of publicity surrounded this string of appearances, with the Smithsonian Institution offering a reward for its hide. U.S. President Theodore Roosevelt reportedly considered postponing an African safari to personally hunt the beast. It was later revealed that these reports were part of a hoax perpetrated by Middletown Valley Register editor George C. Rhoderick and reporter Ralph S. Wolfe in an attempt to increase readership. The descriptions they invented borrowed themes from existing German folklore, including dragon-like creatures who snatched children and livestock, and appeared to invoke descriptions of the Jersey Devil, which had been spotted mere weeks earlier.

On June 22, 1953, Whittaker Chambers (whose home lies in Carroll County, Maryland) used the snallygaster to examine U.S. Senator Joseph McCarthy in his essay "Is Academic Freedom in Danger?", featured in Life:

It was a trick of fate in a low comedy mood that Senator McCarthy should first have bounded into public view dragging the unlikely and protesting person of Mr. Lattimore to share with him a historic spotlight so grateful to the one and so acutely unwanted by the other. It was a trick of fate that, in the case of each, has led to some serious confusions. For it led to the translation of Senator McCarthy into the symbol of a national snallygaster (a winged hobgoblin used to frighten naughty children in parts of rural Maryland), instead of one of the two things that he obviously is: an instinctive politician of a kind fairly common in our history, in which case the uproar he inspires is a phenomenon much more arresting than the senator; or a politician of a kind wholly new in our history, in which case he merits the most cautious and coldblooded appraisal.

== In popular culture ==
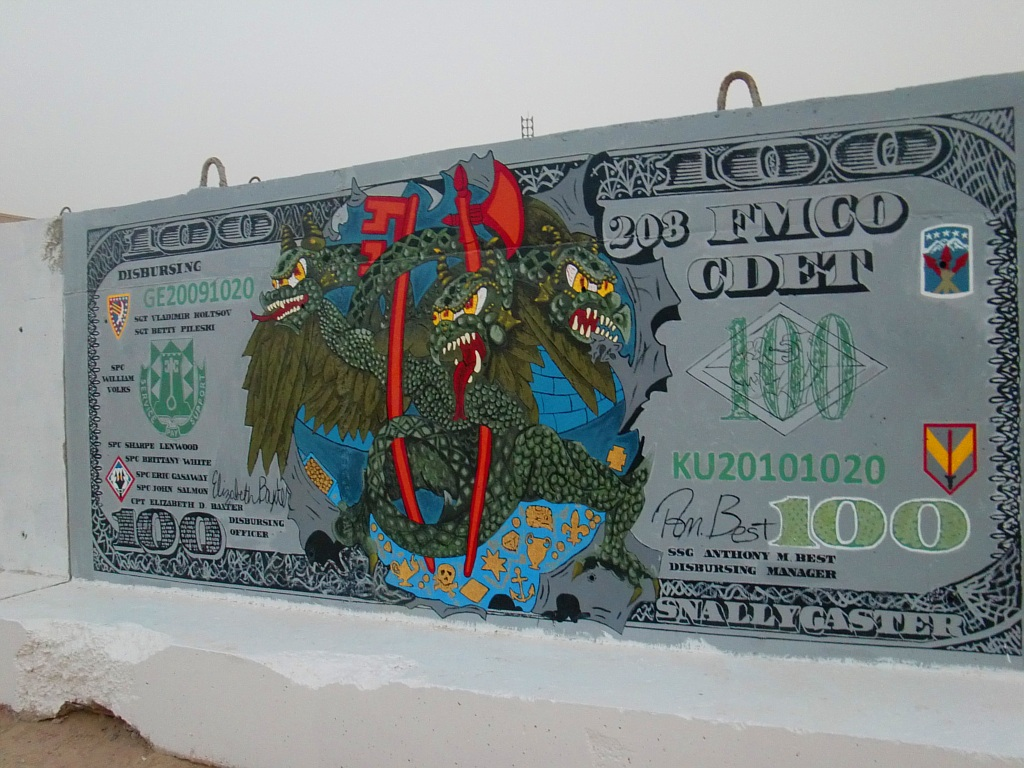
Snallygaster on a Jersey barrier in Udairi, Kuwait

In 2008, author Patrick Boyton published a history of the snallygaster, entitled Snallygaster: the Lost Legend of Frederick County.

In 2011, an annual beer festival called the "Snallygaster", subtitled a "Beastly Beer Jamboree", began in Washington, D.C.

The snallygaster is mentioned in Season 2 of Mountain Monsters.

The 2017 edition of J. K. Rowling's Fantastic Beasts and Where to Find Them incorporated the Snallygaster into her Harry Potter universe. It is described as a part-bird, part-reptile relative of the Occamy, with serrated steel fangs, a bulletproof hide, and a natural sense of curiosity.

A creature called a snallygaster appears in the 2018 Bethesda game Fallout 76. It bears little resemblance to the creature of legend and is described in the game as a failed genetic experiment.

Released in 2018, the Snallygaster is a blended whiskey produced by Dragon Distillery of Frederick, Maryland.

Snallygaster's Cafe and Wine Bar is a popular restaurant in historic Harpers Ferry, West Virginia.

The Snallygaster is mentioned in episode 4, season 5 of the series Chesapeake Shores, where Snally Hunters gather for an annual holiday in search of the fantastic animal.

In 2021, Sarah Cooper, a cryptozoologist in Maryland, opened The American Snallygaster Museum in Libertytown, Maryland.

== See also ==
- Goatman (urban legend)
- Rukh
- List of West Virginia cryptids
