= Musik =

Musik may refer to:

== Music ==
- Die Musik (1901–1943), a German music magazine
- Musik (album), the second studio album by Richie Hawtin
- Musik (musical), the musical written by Jonathan Harvey and Pet Shop Boys
- Musik (song), the Austrian entry at the Eurovision Song Contest 1971
- The Musik, a 24-hour-a-day Urdu-language music channel from Pakistan

== Other uses ==
- Erna Musik (1921–2009), Austrian politician and activist
- Musik, Iran, a village in Kurdistan Province, Iran

== See also ==
- Music (disambiguation)
- Musick (disambiguation)
- Muzik (disambiguation)
