= Ruth Ann Musick =

American folklorist

- Born: Ruth Ann Musick; September 17, 1897; Kirksville, Missouri, United States
- Died: July 2, 1974 (aged 76); Fairmont, West Virginia, United States
- Citizenship: United States
- Education: Kirksville State Teacher's College (BS); State University of Iowa (MS, PhD)
- Alma mater: Kirksville State Teacher's College; State University of Iowa
- Occupations: Writer, folklorist, educator
- Years active: 1940s–1974
- Known for: West Virginia folklore scholarship
- Notable work: Ballads, Folk Songs, and Folk Tales from West Virginia; The Telltale Lilac Bush and Other West Virginia Ghost Tales
- Relatives: Archie Musick (brother); John R. Musick (uncle)

Ruth Ann Musick (September 17, 1897 – July 2, 1974) was an American writer and folklorist specializing in West Virginia. She was the sister of artist Archie Musick and niece of writer John R. Musick.

== Biography ==
=== Youth and education ===
Born in Kirksville, Missouri, to Levi Prince Musick and Zada (or Sadie) Goeghegan, Musick received a Bachelor of Science degree in Education from Kirksville State Teacher's College (now Truman State University) in 1919. From September 1919 to June 1921 Musick taught at Luana High School, Luana, Iowa, before moving to Garwin, Iowa, in 1921, where she taught at Garwin High School until June 1922. She then continued her education at the State University of Iowa, graduating with a Master of Science in mathematics in 1928. Between 1923 and 1931, Musick taught at Logan High School, in La Crosse, Wisconsin. For five years beginning in 1931 she taught at Phoenix Union High School, Phoenix, Arizona, before returning to the Midwest in 1938 to begin her doctoral study at the State University of Iowa. It was here that her interest in folklore developed. She was granted a Doctor of Philosophy in English in 1943. Her dissertation was a novel, “Hell’s Holler,” which went unpublished until 2020. It dealt with the primitive conditions of her native Chariton River Valley and its tensions with the college of osteopathic medicine in nearby Kirksville, Missouri. While the novel reflects in some measure her grappling with her brief and unhappy marriage to an alcoholic artist, which ended in divorce in 1941, it draws heavily on events, people, and folk beliefs that surrounded her in her childhood.

=== Career ===
Musick began her college teaching career at Iowa's William Penn College, Oskaloosa, Iowa, in 1942; two years later she became a member of the faculty of Iowa Wesleyan College. In 1946 she moved to West Virginia to accept a teaching position at Fairmont State College now Fairmont State University where she continued to teach until her retirement in May 1967. She felt that the Appalachian region surrounding the college was ripe for fieldwork in folklore, and the college in need of courses on folk literature. She laid out a program of research which was approved by college president George H. Hand, and the college’s first folklore course was inaugurated in 1948. In 1950 she revived the state’s folklore society, dormant since 1917 (two years after its founding), and in 1951 became the founding editor of West Virginia Folklore, serving in that capacity until her retirement in 1967. According to her eulogy by William Hugh Jansen, Folklore Professor at the University of Kentucky, she had become “a public relations agent for West Virginia Folklore.” At the same time, she wrote two folklore columns for West Virginia newspapers: “The Old Folks Say” for the Times-West Virginian in Fairmont and “Sassafras Tea” for the Allegheny Journal in Elkins and Marlinton, while making numerous conference appearances, publishing regularly in a wide variety of journals, offering workshops and public presentations, and giving talks on radio and television. She was also active as a poet, writer of short stories, and dramatist with community theater programs. Although little of her fiction was published, she continued writing this as well as collecting and publishing folklore. Her fiction (novels, stories, children's stories) weaves folk beliefs into the narrative.

Throughout her life, Musick was a passionate activist on behalf of animals (she was a vegetarian from the age of six), justice for Native Americans, and environmental causes, activist in her writings against mountaintop removal mining, acid rain, and other issues.

Dr. Musick was diagnosed with spinal cancer on November 8, 1973, and died July 2, 1974, in Fairmont, West Virginia, at age 76. In the interests of medical progress, she had allowed herself to be subjected to experimental treatments. Her papers are now archived in the West Virginia Folklife Center at Fairmont State. In 1980, the university library was renamed in her honor.

== Works ==
=== Books ===
- Hell's Holler (2020), Musick's 1943 novel (and Iowa doctoral dissertation), based on folklore of Adair County MO, published as a special issue of the Missouri Folklore Society Journal, with illustrations by her brother, artist Archie Musick.
- Ballads, Folk Songs, and Folk Tales from West Virginia (1960), Morgantown:West Virginia University Library
- The Telltale Lilac Bush and Other West Virginia Ghost Tales (1965), Lexington: The University Press of Kentucky
- Green Hills of Magic, West Virginia Folktales From Europe (1970), Lexington: The University Press of Kentucky
- Coffin Hollow and Other Ghost Tales (1977), Lexington: The University Press of Kentucky
- Mountain Mother Goose: Child Lore of West Virginia (posthumous: 2013) Fairmont: Fairmont State University

=== Short stories and articles ===
- 1946. “A Missouri Dance Call.” Journal of American Folklore, 59, 323-34.
- 1946. “Three Folksongs from Missouri.” Hoosier Folklore, 5 (March 1946), 29-34.
- 1946. “Iowa Student Tales,” Hoosier Folklore, 5 (September 1946), 103-110.
- 1947. “Folklore from West Virginia,” Hoosier Folklore, 6 (June 1947), 41- 49.
- 1947. “The Old Album of William A. Larkin.” Journal of American Folklore, 60, 201-51.
- 1947. “A Snake Story from West Virginia.” Journal of American Folklore, 60, 301.
- 1947. Review of Ozark Folksongs, Vol. I, by Vance Randolph. Journal of American Folklore, *60, 434-36.
- 1948. “West Virginia Folklore.” Hoosier Folklore, 7 (March 1948), 1-14.
- 1948. “The Tune the Old Cow Died On,” Hoosier Folklore, 7 (December 1948), 105-106.
- 1949. Review of Ozark Folksongs, Vols. II-III, by Vance Randolph. Journal of American Folklore, 62, 453-55.
- 1950. “Children's Rhymes from Missouri.” (written in collaboration with Vance Randolph) Journal of American Folklore, 63, 425-37.
- 1950. “Skeletons from a Homespunner's Closet,” From the Manuscript of James S. Williams. Hoosier Folklore, 9 (October–December 1950), 111-116.
- 1951. “Folksong Hunters in Missouri.” (written in collaboration with Vance Randolph) Midwest Folklore, 1,23-31.
- 1951. “Juggin' Party Tales.” Southern Folklore Quarterly, 15 (September), 211-219.
- 1951. Review of Ozark Folksongs, Vol. IV, by Vance Randolph. Journal of American Folklore, 64, 442-43.
- 1952. “Indiana Witch Tales.” Journal of American Folklore, 65, 57-65.
- 1952. “Omens and Tokens of West Virginia.” Midwest Folklore, 2, 263- 267.
- 1956. “European Folktales in West Virginia.” Midwest Folklore, 6, 27- 37.
- 1957. “Ballads and Folksongs from West Virginia: Part I.” Journal of American Folklore, 70, 247-61.
- 1957. “Ballads and Folksongs from West Virginia: Part II.” Journal of American Folklore, 70, 336-57.
- 1957. "The Man Who Could Ride Lightning." Colorado Quarterly, 6, 1 (Summer 1957), 17-29
- 1958. “West Virginia Ghost Stories.” Midwest Folklore, 8, 21-28.
- 1960. “The Trickster Story in West Virginia.” Midwest Folklore, 10, 125-132.
- 1963. "Jesse James and the Mortgage Holders." Colorado Quarterly, 7, 2 (Autumn 1963), 129-139
- 1974. Witchcraft and the Devil in West Virginia.Appalachian Journal: A Regional Studies Review, 1974. 1, 271-76.
