= Muzik (disambiguation) =

Muzik was a British music magazine.

Muzik may also refer to:

== Music ==
- For Muzik, debut extended play by 4minute
- "Muzik", song from the 2002 rap EP L.A. Confidential Presents: Knoc-turn'al
- Mike Paradinas (born 1971), British musician known under the name "μ-Ziq"

== Media ==
- Muzik FM (formerly Radio Muzik), Malaysia's first FM radio station
- TRT Müzik, a Turkish television channel

== Other uses ==
- Jiří Mužík (born 1976), Czech hurdler
- Muzik night club in Toronto's Horticulture Building

== See also ==
- Music (disambiguation)
- Musick (disambiguation)
- Musik (disambiguation)
