= Musica (retailer) =

Public entertainment retailing company

- Industry: Music & film retail
- Founded: 1992 (33 years ago)
- Defunct: 26 May 2021
- Headquarters: South Africa
- Number of locations: 59 stores (as of 2021)
- Products: Music film merchandise technology video games books
- Owner: Clicks Group
- Website: www.musica.co.za

Musica was a South African-based music and film retailer. The first Musica-branded store was opened in 1992 and later in the same year was bought by Clicks Group for R1.2 million in 1992.

In 2006, under pressure to change its business model due to the growth of online music purchases, the company expanded its range of products to film, video games, electronic accessories, branded clothing merchandise and books. In 2015 Clicks reported that its Musica brand did around R1 billion in turnover with that turnover declining by between 10% and 15% every year thereafter until its closure. The 2020 COVID pandemic and resulting lockdown was reported as the final nail in the coffin.

On January 28, 2021, the company announced that it would be closing all its remaining 59 branches by the end of May 2021. However, on May 26, 2021, the chain shut down the last remaining stores a few days before the expected date. The last remaining store, was the store in Canal Walk Shopping Centre in Cape Town.
