= Raven Mocker =

Evil spirit in Cherokee mythology that steals life from the dying

Creature information
- Other name(s): Kâ’lanû Ahkyeli’skï (ᎪᎳᏅ ᎠᏰᎵᏍᎩ), Tsundige’wi, He Who Covers His Face, Death Caller, Heart Eater
- Grouping: Witch, Evil spirit
- Folklore: Cherokee mythology

Origin
- First attested: Pre-colonial Cherokee folklore
- Country: United States
- Region: Appalachia
- Details: Steals life from the sick and dying

The Raven Mockers (Cherokee: ᎪᎳᏅ ᎠᏰᎵᏍᎩ, romanized: Kâ'lanû Ahkyeli'skï) are figures in Cherokee mythology, described as witches or evil spirits that prolong their lives by preying on the sick and dying. They are often depicted as withered and aged, flying through the night while emitting cries resembling a raven’s call. Consuming the hearts of their victims, they absorb the remaining years of life. Though invisible to most, skilled medicine men can detect and repel them. According to tradition, recognizing a Raven Mocker in its true form causes it to die within seven days.

== Mythology ==
The Raven Mocker is said to prey on the sick or dying to extend its lifespan. At night, it is believed to fly through the air in fiery form, with outstretched arms resembling wings and sparks trailing behind. Their flight is accompanied by the sound of rushing wind and their cries, described as resembling a raven's dive call, are considered an omen of death.

Raven Mockers are said to gather at the homes of the dying, tormenting their victims by pressing on their chests to restrict breathing or throwing them to the ground. After the victim dies, the Raven Mocker is believed to remove and consume the heart to absorb the victim's remaining lifespan. No marks are left on the body, but the heart is said to be missing.

Although feared for their power, other witches are said to avoid the Raven Mocker. Medicine men, using special knowledge, can detect and repel them from entering homes. Tradition holds that if a Raven Mocker is seen in its true form, it dies within seven days. Gunskaliski, a renowned Cherokee shaman, was said to have destroyed several Raven Mockers by using a special tea made from duck-root, enabling him to see them.

== Other names ==
In Cherokee tradition, Raven Mockers are also called "Kâ'lanû Ahkyeli'skï" ("The Death Spirit") and "Tsundige’wi" ("He Who Covers His Face"). Other titles such as "Death Caller" and "Heart Eater" reflect their feared ability to consume hearts and steal life.

== Stories ==
A notable tale involves a young hunter who sought refuge in what appeared to be an abandoned home. While resting, he heard the cry of a raven. An old man and woman returned to the house and revealed themselves as Raven Mockers when they discussed stealing lives. The hunter witnessed them roasting what appeared to be a human heart. The next morning, the old man gave the hunter a gift of beadwork, warning him not to speak of what he saw. However, the hunter discarded the gift in a stream and informed his village. Seven days later, a group of warriors found the couple dead and burned their home to ensure the destruction of the Raven Mockers.

Another story recounts how two men prepared by a medicine man fasted for seven days and were given a vision-enhancing remedy made from muskrat brain. This enabled them to witness creatures, including a Raven Mocker, gathered near a grave. The men saw the Raven Mocker dig into the earth but fled in fear after attempting to stop it. They later underwent healing rituals to recover from the experience.

Another account tells of a man left to die alone because his family feared the presence of Raven Mockers. As he lay dying, witnesses claimed the Raven Mockers tormented him, hastening his death by pressing on his chest and lifting him from his bed. After his death, it was believed they stole his heart to extend their lives.

One final tale describes a medicine man successfully protecting a dying individual by performing powerful rituals. Witches, including a Raven Mocker, gathered outside the home but were repelled. The Raven Mocker’s presence caused the other witches to scatter in fear.

== In fiction ==
Manly Wade Wellman featured Raven Mockers in his novel The Old Gods Waken (1979), where they are among the creatures encountered by Silver John in Appalachian folklore.

Scott Nicholson portrayed beings similar to Raven Mockers in his novel They Hunger (2007), set in a gorge resembling the Linville Gorge Wilderness in Appalachia.

P.C. Cast depicted Raven Mockers as antagonists in her House of Night series. In this series, they are the "spirit" children of the fallen angel Kalona and human women, possessing the ability to steal the lives of those near death.

Raven Mockers also appear in The Curse of the Raven Mocker by Marly Youmans, where the protagonist, Adanta, seeks to stop a figure resembling a Raven Mocker to save her mother.

A Raven Mocker is the main antagonist in "Evil in the Night," episode 57 of Walker, Texas Ranger, where it is depicted as a medicine man with shape-shifting abilities and the power to cause hallucinations in his victims.

In Faith Hunter's Jane Yellowrock series, Raven Mockers are mentioned in connection with the protagonist, a skinwalker of Cherokee heritage.

The Raven Mocker is an antagonist in the series Mountain Monsters.

A RAVEN'S CALL - Cherokee Indian Horror Short Film produced by Mad Crab Productions features a Raven Mocker.
