= Mountain Monsters =

2013 American reality television series

- Season 3 intertitle
- Genre: Reality
- Starring: John Tice; Jeff Headlee; Willy McQuillian; Joseph Lott; William Neff; Jacob Lowe
- Narrated by: Michael Berger
- Theme music composer: Last American Cowboys
- Opening theme: "Mountain Man Town"
- Country of origin: United States
- Original language: English
- No. of seasons: 8
- No. of episodes: 79

Production
- Executive producers: Colt Straub; Duke Straub; Russell Geyser; Jay Blumke; Ken Charles; Royal Malley
- Producer: American Chainsaws
- Running time: 42–60 minutes

Original release
- Network: Destination America (2013–17); Travel Channel (2019–22); Discovery+ (2021–22); DMAX (2013–19); Max (streaming service) (2023)
- Release: June 22, 2013 – March 13, 2022

Mountain Monsters is an American cryptozoology-themed reality television series airing on Travel Channel. It originally premiered on June 22, 2013, on Destination America. The series follows the Appalachian Investigators of Mysterious Sightings (A.I.M.S) team, a band of six native West Virginian hunters and trappers, as they research and track unidentified creatures in the Appalachian Mountains. A spinoff series titled Mountain Monsters: By The Fire features extra facts and never-before-seen footage from different episodes of the series.

The series aired for five seasons on Destination America. After an 18-month hiatus, it was announced that the series was renewed for a sixth season and would be moving to Travel Channel.

In 2021 it was announced that a TV special titled Mountain Monsters: A Tribute to Trapper would premiere on January 3, 2021. It was also announced that the seventh season will premiere on January 10, 2021. It was announced shortly after the premiere of Season 7 that new episodes would be streaming exclusively on Discovery+.

The official Mountain Monsters Instagram account revealed on December 10, 2021, that an eighth season would premiere in January 2022. The season premiered on January 2, 2022, and ran for 10 episodes, ending its run on March 13, 2022. In September 2024, Buck said that the series would not be returning for a ninth season. The series will end after eight seasons and 79 episodes. In the eighth season finale, the series ends with a cliffhanger.

In June 2025, three members of the A.I.M.S. team — Buck, Huckleberry, and Wild Bill — returned and moved to YouTube under a brand-new name: The Sons of Appalachia (the SOA Team). A new Cryptid-hunting show of the same name, produced by CPM Studios and picking up where Mountain Monsters left off, was also released on their official YouTube channel. The new show also revealed several mysteries that had gone unanswered in Mountain Monsters, including the mystery of what was inside the box at the end of Season 6: The Quest for Spearfinger.

== Premise ==
The A.I.M.S team is a self-styled, cryptozoology research team founded by West Virginians John "Trapper" Tice, Jeff Headlee, and Willy McQuillian. Their goal is to prove the existence of mysterious creatures such as Bigfoot, Wampus cat, Werewolf, Hellhound, Lizard Man, and Mothman. The episodes normally begin with Trapper, Jeff, Huckleberry, and Buck discussing the specific creature they are hunting on the way to the location where the creature was spotted. They then meet with eyewitnesses who have encountered the creature, giving the team an idea of where to conduct an initial night investigation to find evidence of the creature being in the area.

After concluding their initial night hunt, Willy and Wild Bill begin work on a trap to contain the creature while the rest of the team searches for more evidence, meeting with additional eyewitnesses who normally possess photographic, video, or audio evidence of the creature. After testing the completed trap the team begins the final night hunt.

Cryptids such as the Cave Creature, Chupacabra, Wildman (Bigfoot), Waya Woman and the Smoke Wolf are sometimes supposedly caught on camera. They are also shown as a digital rendering appearing before and after commercial breaks. The team attempts to capture these creatures (with Hogzilla, three Devil Dogs and two wolves from the Tygart Valley being their most recent trapped creatures). In some instances, the team places trail cameras and/or infrared camcorders near the trap to capture photographic evidence of the creature in question. They have caught fleeting, blurry images of what they claim to be the Grassman, Shadow Creature, Cherokee Death Cat, Black Wolf and the Bigfoot from the Tygart Valley on camera, to name but a few. More recently a recurring rogue team has spied on and sabotaged the A.I.M.S team and their investigations. But the Rogue Team did not have much involvement in the show's 6th season, which focused more on the team hunting monsters like in the earlier seasons.

As of the 7th season, Trapper has died. The remaining team continued to hunt cryptids in his memory.

After Mountain Monsters was cancelled, to continue the legacy of John 'Trapper' Tice, three veteran members of the A.I.M.S. team – Jacob 'Buck' Lowe, Joseph 'Huckleberry' Lott, and William 'Wild Bill' Neff – teamed up to create a brand-new cryptid-themed show called Sons of Appalachia as a replacement for Mountain Monsters, which airs for free on YouTube. Season 1 of Sons of Appalachia begins when the SOA team is unexpectedly led to an old box, buried for decades in the middle of Tygart Valley, which was believed to have belonged to their team leader, Trapper. After uncovering the meaning behind the box, the team sets off to North Carolina — home of their old foe, the Cherokee Devil — to continue their quest for Spearfinger. After resolving the unfinished business surrounding Spearfinger, The Sons of Appalachia decide to return to their roots as the team heads back to West Virginia, preparing for a brand-new hunt for the legendary Dogman to continue their mission of tracking down the mysterious creatures of the Appalachian Mountains, just like in the old days.

Besides the paranormal and monster-hunting elements in Sons of Appalachia, the show also features the presence of another mysterious organization known as the 13th Dominion, which monitors and sabotages the SOA team. This shadowy organization is believed to be the hidden force behind the Rogue Team that the former members of A.I.M.S. (the SOA team) once confronted in the original show.

In the period between mid-2023 and early 2025, unverified rumors circulated online claiming that cast member Joseph "Huckleberry" Lott had died. These claims were proven false. Huckleberry remains alive and well, and he currently appears alongside Buck and Wild Bill in the YouTube series Sons of Appalachia.

== Cast members ==
Character	Role	Mountain Monsters								Sons of Appalachia		A.I.M.S.: The Appalachian Files
Character	Role	2013 Season 1	2014 Season 2	2015 Season 3	2016 Season 4	2017 Season 5	2019 Season 6	2021 Season 7	2022 Season 8	2025	2026	2026
John "Trapper" Tice	Team Leader	Main	Main	Main	Main	Recurring	Recurring	His death 2019				
Jacob "Buck" Lowe	Expert Caller Team Leader since 2025	Main	Main	Main	Main	Main	Main	Main	Main	Main	Main	
Joseph "Huckleberry" Lott	Security	Main	Main	Main	Main	Main	Main	Main	Main	Main	Main	
Jeff Headlee	Researcher Team Leader since 2026	Main	Main	Main	Main	Main	Main	Main	Main			Main
Willy McQuillian	Trap Builder	Main	Main	Main	Main	Main	Main	Main	Main			Main
William "Wild Bill" Neff	Expert Tracker	Main	Main	Main	Main	Main	Main	Main	Main	Main	Main	

== Production ==
Prior to the season six premiere, John "Trapper" Tice announced that he would have limited involvement due to a myriad of serious health issues. He made a minor appearance in the first episode of the season where he was visited by Huckleberry and Buck to whom he expressed the severity of his situation. He made one more brief appearance in the season's eighth episode. Tice died on December 16, 2019.

== Series overview ==
Season	Episodes	Originally released	
Season	Episodes	First released	Last released
1	6	June 22, 2013	July 27, 2013
2	14	April 4, 2014	July 25, 2014
3	8	March 7, 2015	April 25, 2015
4	11	January 23, 2016	April 16, 2016
5	8	April 8, 2017	June 3, 2017
6	10	August 21, 2019	November 20, 2019
7	8	January 3, 2021	March 7, 2021
8	10	January 2, 2022	March 13, 2022

After the merger with Discovery, Max made the series available for streaming, but concatenated the first two seasons into Season 1, the second two into Season 2, and then proceeds with the rest of the series numbered from there. It was announced that after 8 seasons the show would not return for a 9th season.

== Episodes ==
=== Season 1: (2013) ===
No. overall	No. in season	Title	Original release date
1	1	"Wolfman of Wolfe County"	June 22, 2013
The A.I.M.S. team heads to Wolfe County, Kentucky, to use their backwoods and monster-hunting knowledge to catch the legendary Wolfman and make Appalachia safe once again.
2	2	"Grassman of Perry County"	June 29, 2013
Residents of Perry County, Ohio, have reported a 1,000 pound Ohio Grassman seen in the woods, and so the A.I.M.S team heads there to try to capture it.
3	3	"Devil Dog of Logan County"	July 6, 2013
The A.I.M.S team try to capture the blood-sucking Devil Dog that is terrorizing a region in Logan County, West Virginia.
4	4	"Wampus Beast of Pleasants County"	July 13, 2013
When a 500-pound Wampus Beast is rumored to have been killing the cattle in Pleasants County, West Virginia, the A.I.M.S team heads there to catch it.
5	5	"Mothman of Mason County"	July 20, 2013
Mason County, West Virginia, has been terrorized by a flying beast, known as the Mothman for several decades, it appears he is back again. The A.I.M.S team must capture it once and for all.
6	6	"Lizard Demon of Wood County"	July 27, 2013
The A.I.M.S. team sets out for Wood County, West Virginia, to capture a creature known as the Lizard Demon.

=== Season 2: (2014) ===
No. overall	No. in season	Title	Original release date
7	1	"Kentucky Hellhound of Pike County"	April 4, 2014
The A.I.M.S. team travel to Pike County, Kentucky, to investigate a huge canine predator who is menacing the local farming community. The team meets with eyewitnesses and races to construct a giant bamboo box trap before the creature migrates for the winter.
8	2	"Grafton Monster of Taylor County"	April 11, 2014
The A.I.M.S. team travel to Taylor County, West Virginia, to investigate a huge bipedal predator nicknamed the "Headless Horror." The team meets with eyewitnesses, tracks the creature, and attempts to capture it inside of a massive wooden trap.
9	3	"Yahoo of Nicholas County"	April 18, 2014
The A.I.M.S. team travel to Nicholas County, West Virginia, to investigate a large Bigfoot-like creature called "The Yahoo". The team meets with eyewitnesses, tracks the beast, and attempts to capture it inside of a giant log-fall trap.
10	4	"Werewolf of Webster County"	April 25, 2014
The A.I.M.S. team travel to Webster County, West Virginia, to investigate the legendary Webster Werewolf, a massive wolf-like creature with ancient mythical ties. The team meets with eyewitnesses and works to complete a pit-trap before the full moon passes.
11	5	"Fire Dragon of Pocahontas County"	May 2, 2014
The A.I.M.S. team travel to Pocahontas County, West Virginia, to investigate a gigantic, aquatic reptile called the "Fire Dragon". The team meets with eyewitnesses and constructs an elaborate water trap before pursuing the creature on land and boat.
12	6	"Sheepsquatch of Boone County"	May 9, 2014
The A.I.M.S. team travel to Boone County, West Virginia, to investigate a bizarre and aggressive creature called "The Sheepsquatch." The team meets with eyewitnesses and builds a custom razor wire trap before embarking upon a perilous night hunt.
13	7	"Shadow Creature of Braxton County"	May 30, 2014
The A.I.M.S. team travel to Braxton County, West Virginia, to investigate a clandestine killer known as "The Shadow Creature". The team rappels cliffs and navigates the big timber as they chase the monster toward a super-sized snare trap.
14	8	"Wild Bill's Bear Beast"	June 6, 2014
The A.I.M.S. team travel to Raleigh County, West Virginia, to investigate a killer bear-canine hybrid called the "Red-Eyed Bear Beast." The team tracks the creature across treacherous terrain and rivers and attempts to capture it inside of a caldron trap.
15	9	"Death Cat of Cherokee County"	June 13, 2014
The A.I.M.S. team travel to Cherokee County, North Carolina, to investigate a ferocious feline called "The Cherokee Death Cat." The team works to unravel the myth surrounding the creature and attempts to capture it inside of a complex wooden trap.
16	10	"Snallygaster of Preston County"	June 27, 2014
The A.I.M.S. team travel to Preston County, West Virginia, to investigate a huge flying predator called "The Snallygaster." The team encounters great danger when they invade the creature's territory and attempt to capture it inside of a large wooden box trap.
17	11	"Cave Creatures of Greenbrier County"	July 11, 2014
The A.I.M.S. team travel to Greenbrier County, West Virginia, to investigate a humanoid bipedal called "The Cave Creature." The team tracks the elusive creature through a twenty-mile cave system toward a series of snare traps.
18	12	"Hogzilla of Hocking Hills"	July 18, 2014
The A.I.M.S. team travel to the treacherous terrain of Hocking Hills, Ohio, to investigate a huge hog-like creature called "Hogzilla." After meeting with eyewitnesses, the team races to capture the beast inside of a massive steel cage trap.
19	13	"Bloodless Howler of Harrison County"	July 25, 2014
The A.I.M.S. team travel to Harrison County, West Virginia, to investigate a vicious canine-feline hybrid known as "The Bloodless Howler." The team tracks the predator toward their Asian tiger-box trap in frigid temperatures.
20	14	"Grassman's Revengeance"	July 31, 2014
In the two-hour season finale, the A.I.M.S. team travel back to Perry County, Ohio, to settle an unfinished score with a massive Bigfoot-like creature. The team works to unravel the mystery of the Ohio Grassman's identity and faces their greatest danger yet.

=== Season 3: Bigfoot Edition Part 1 (2015) ===
No. overall	No. in season	Title	Original release date
21	1	"Bigfoot of Central Kentucky"	March 7, 2015
The Appalachian Investigators of Mysterious Sightings begin their epic quest to prove the existence of Bigfoot in the Appalachia as they head out to Central Kentucky after what they believe is the first Bigfoot to emerge from the Mammoth Cave System: the Midnight Whistler.
22	2	"Bigfoot of Putnam County"	March 14, 2015
Appalachian Investigators of Mysterious Sightings travel to Putnam County to investigate the Chupacabra, known as the West Virginia Vampire. The team must meet with eyewitnesses and build an elaborate maze trap in an attempt to capture the creature.
23	3	"Bigfoot of Eastern Kentucky"	March 21, 2015
Appalachian Investigators of Mysterious Sightings travel to Eastern Kentucky to investigate the Wildman, known as the most dangerous and aggressive Bigfoot in the region. The team searches for a missing eyewitness and builds the largest and strongest trap.
24	4	"Bigfoot of Lincoln County"	March 28, 2015
Appalachian Investigators of Mysterious Sightings travel to Lincoln County to investigate the Hellhound who left a bad taste in their mouth after evading them last autumn.
25	5	"Bigfoot of Clay County"	April 4, 2015
Appalachian Investigators of Mysterious Sightings travel to Clay County to investigate the "Yahoo", who threw trees at them and destroyed their trap in Nicholas County last autumn. The team must build an electrified trap to contain this Bigfoot.
26	6	"Bigfoot of Washington County"	April 11, 2015
The A.I.M.S. team travels to Washington County to investigate the "Dustman", thought to be the fastest and most agile Bigfoot in the region. They must build a quicksand pit trap, and rappel down a cliff at night to its cave lair.
27	7	"Bigfoot of Ashe County: A.I.M.S. Under Attack"	April 18, 2015
The A.I.M.S. team head to Ashe County, North Carolina, in search of the "Cherokee Devil". This Bigfoot is thought to possess mind control abilities. When Buck has an encounter with the creature the team fights back, only to have another team member fall under its supposed spell.
28	8	"Bigfoot of Ashe County: A.I.M.S. Erupts"	April 25, 2015
The A.I.M.S. team go back to Ashe County to hunt the "Cherokee Devil" a savage Bigfoot that has already scarred members of the team. As the mission continues the biggest rift in A.I.M.S. history erupts and some members debate hanging up their gear for good.

=== Season 4: Bigfoot Edition Part 2 (2016) ===
No. overall	No. in season	Title	Original release date	US viewers (millions)
29	1	"Bigfoot of Harrison County: Stonish Giant"	January 23, 2016	0.511
The team heads to Ohio to investigate the Stonish Giant, a Bigfoot that Native American folklore says has a coat of fur so thick it cannot be pierced by arrows. Note: This was Trapper's final hunt with the team, before he fell ill.
30	2	"Bigfoot of Central Kentucky: Squalling Savage"	January 30, 2016	0.525
The team returns to Central Kentucky - where they brushed with the Midnight Whistler before - in an attempt to go after a Bigfoot the locals call "The Squalling Savage". When the team finds out that this group of creatures and the Midnight Whistlers are territorial towards one another, they taunt the creatures with whistles and attempt to trap one of them in a tree trap.
31	3	"Bigfoot of Blair County: Lightning Man"	February 6, 2016	0.535
The team travels to Blair County, Pennsylvania, in search of a Bigfoot known as the Lightning Man. After meeting the eyewitnesses, the team believes the key to the investigation may be a Native American lightning symbol hidden inside a secluded barn.
32	4	"Bigfoot of Blair County: Thunder Brothers"	February 13, 2016	0.463
The team returns to Pennsylvania to solve the mystery of the Lightning Man and his clan of Bigfoot known as the Thunder Brothers. A meeting with a local Bigfoot expert reveals they've uncovered something that wasn't meant to be unearthed.
33	Special	"Scariest Moments"	February 20, 2016	0.344
The AIMS team revisits the most terrifying moments from their epic investigations. Highlights include the Hellhound, Cherokee Death Cat, Cave Creature, Bear Beast, Shadow Creature and the massive Hogzilla.
34	5	"Bigfoot of Pendleton County: Great Fire Ape"	February 27, 2016	0.460
The team heads to Pendleton County to track down a Bigfoot that is drawn to fire. The team incorporates fireworks into their final hunt strategy but soon learn no one is safe from the Fire Ape when a crew member goes missing.
35	6	"Bigfoot of Wirt County: The Ash Man"	March 5, 2016	0.464
The team heads to Huckleberry's hometown in Wirt County to hunt down a Bigfoot known as the Ash Man. They construct their largest trap to date in order to capture the massive creature.
36	7	"Bigfoot of Lee County: Raven Mocker"	March 12, 2016	0.411
The team goes on the hunt for a shapeshifting Bigfoot known by the Cherokee people as the Raven Mocker. A terrifying encounter leads them to believe there is something eviler than they ever imagined haunting the forests of Virginia.
37	Special	"Best of Bigfoot"	March 19, 2016	0.410
The AIMS team revisits the most thrilling moments along the way of their epic Bigfoot quest. Highlights include the Midnight Whistler, the Wildman, the Yahoo, the Dustman and the most mysterious Bigfoot of all, the Cherokee Devil.
38	8	"Raven Mocker: Back to Trapper"	March 26, 2016	0.468
The AIMS team reunites with Trapper to get his opinion on how they should take on the legendary Raven Mocker. They soon learn their only option is to face-off against the shapeshifting Bigfoot.
39	9	"Bigfoot of Wood County: The Phantom of the Forest"	April 2, 2016	0.442
The team heads to Wood County to track down a Bigfoot known as the Phantom of the Forest. They soon find themselves caught in a feud with local poachers who are out to kill the massive beast.
40	10	"Return of the Rogue Team"	April 9, 2016	0.536
The team heads back to Perry County to go after the biggest, baddest Bigfoot on the planet, the Ohio Grassman. AIMS soon realize they're being followed by the rogue team that has been tracking them through the Appalachian Mountains.
41	11	"AIMS vs The Rogue Team"	April 16, 2016	0.659
AIMS continue their mission to discover the identity of the mysterious and dangerous rogue team. They must make a decision on whether they should carry on with this deadly game of cat and mouse, or if they should finally admit defeat and back down.

=== Season 5: Secrets of the Dark Forest (2017) ===
No. overall	No. in season	Title	Original release date
42	1	"The Rogue Team Rises: Part 1"	April 8, 2017
After nine months of silence, the Rogue Team emerges from the shadows after team member Buck tries to take matters into his own hands; the A.I.M.S. team meets face to face with this other mysterious team to find out who they are and what they are after.
43	2	"The Rogue Team Rises: Part 2"	April 15, 2017
After being abducted, the A.I.M.S. team faces a mysterious man who offers them a deal with an incredible payoff. The team suddenly realizes Trapper is missing and they set off to locate him in a race against time after finding a trail of his blood.
44	3	"Enter The Dark Forest"	April 22, 2017
The A.I.M.S. team enters the Dark Forest on a mission to capture the legendary "Woman of the Woods" but realize that the forest is the home to another mysterious creature: the Black Wolf.
45	4	"The Black Wolf"	April 29, 2017
The A.I.M.S. team learns that a mysterious creature known as the Black Wolf roams the Dark Forest; a shaman reveals that the Black Wolf's presence may spell disaster for Jeff whose behavior continues to trouble the team.
46	Special	"Superfan Edition"	May 6, 2017
The A.I.M.S. team shares their thoughts, answers fans' biggest questions and tell some of their favorite stories from the road.
47	5	"Huckleberry's Predator"	May 13, 2017
After the A.I.M.S. team is split in half, Jeff must come up with answers about the Dark Forest; while the team gets proof of the Black Wolf, Huckleberry reveals that a mysterious creature is stalking the team and finds himself in a fight for his life.
48	6	"The Three Rings of the North"	May 20, 2017
After a shocking discovery, Buck heads into the Dark Forest and encounters someone from his past; Huckleberry realizes that the predator he faced off with wants revenge; the team follows a trail left by Jeff and discovers the mysterious Three Rings.
49	7	"The Secret of the Little Girl"	May 27, 2017
The team discovers what Jeff was doing at the Three Rings; the team learns what Buck found on his phone; Buck heads to the Three Rings to contact the Little Girl, who seems to be the key to the Dark Forest.
50	8	"The Blood Skull and Woman of the Woods"	June 3, 2017
Buck searches for the Little Girl after he makes contact with her and she vanishes; the rest of the A.I.M.S. team sneaks into a cabin looking for answers about the other team's intentions; Buck winds up face to face with the Woman of the Woods. Note: This episode was made available on May 27, 2017, via the Destination America app – the first time a Mountain Monsters episode was available prior to its regularly scheduled airing.

=== Season 6: The Quest for Spearfinger (2019) ===
No. overall	No. in season	Title	Original release date
51	1	"The Dark Forest Revealed"	August 21, 2019
Continuing right after the events of the previous episode, the team leaves the Dark Forest broken and hurting. 18 months later, the team is inactive and are scared to go back to the dark forest. But after realizing that Buck lost a camera there, they return looking for it. But instead are led to an unusual barn. Here they watch a film of the Rogue Team, who tells them they must find 6 creatures that will lead them to Spearfinger. Note: This is the first episode of the show after an 18-month break, and the first episode to be aired on Travel Channel.
52	2	"The Waya Woman of Jackson County"	August 28, 2019
After a shocking revelation in the dark forest, the A.I.M.S Team travel to Jackson County, West Virginia, as the team heads after a monstrous wolf creature known as the "Waya Woman". This 7-foot-tall being roams the cornfields of Jackson County and the team must build a trap strong enough to contain this beast and also be placed deep in the cornfields. Dead chickens, creepy altars and Wild Bill's high school nickname are all on full display in this incredible episode.
53	3	"The Secret of the Blue House"	September 4, 2019
After making several shocking discoveries in the cornfields of Jackson County, the A.I.M.S team continues its search for the truth surrounding the legendary "Waya Woman". At the heart of this mystery sits an old, abandoned blue house with a terrifying history. Not only have two families been killed here under suspicious circumstances, but their deaths are believed to be tied to the Waya Woman herself. The team finds out that only way to get answers is to simultaneously try out two rituals, which bring about face-to-face encounters they could have never prepared for.
54	4	"The Silver Giant of Boone County"	September 11, 2019
The A.I.M.S team travel to Boone County, West Virginia, to investigate a massive bear-like creature known as the "Silver Giant". This behemoth is said to stand on its hind legs at over 10-feet-tall and has a silver streak running down its back. Due to his love of anything bear related, Wild Bill decides to step up his game and mimic Jeff as the team researcher. But the team members soon learn the Silver Giant may not be the only mysterious creature in the hills of Boone County.
55	5	"The Cherokee Death Cat"	September 18, 2019
The A.I.M.S team continues their quest to get to the bottom of the legend of Spearfinger as they set off to investigate the "Cherokee Death Cat", a massive ferocious feline with a deadly curse.
56	6	"The Mystery of the Death Cat Barn"	September 25, 2019
After discovering their biggest clue yet, the A.I.M.S team realizes they have to get down to a mysterious barn from which they have heard the Cherokee Death Cat roaring at night. But first the team must set off to find missing team member, Huckleberry, who is lost in the cornfields. Trap builder Willy comes up with an ingenious modification to the team's trap for the Death Cat as he installs a hidden, collapsible floor. The team sets off to finally discover what is inside of the mysterious barn and makes a shocking discovery no one is prepared for.
57	7	"The Coyote King"	October 30, 2019
After making a massive discovery in the barn the Death Cat has been heard roaring from, the team soon realizes that they may be up against more than just this ferocious feline. It becomes apparent that an enormous, upright canine known as the "Coyote King" is stalking these hollows as well. Willy builds a zip-line trap in an attempt to deal with mysterious cloaked figures that seem to be drawn to their trap. A massive hunt ensues after Buck breaks out his coyote call and the AIMS team comes face to face with a shocking discovery caught in their trap.
58	8	"The Return of Trapper"	November 6, 2019
After a whirlwind of events transpires the A.I.M.S team realizes that they need to meet up with their team leader Trapper. Trapper opens their eyes as they realize that they have been missing a big clue that has been in front of them all along. Refreshed and refocused, the team heads back to Ashe County, North Carolina, in search of the "Cherokee Devil", which soon proves to be too much for Huckleberry. The team sets out to find a massive rock overhang that they believe may hold a key piece of information of what happened to Huckleberry the last time they searched for the Cherokee Devil.
59	9	"The Secret of the Red Shed"	November 13, 2019
The A.I.M.S team sets off to track down one of the cloaked figures at the heart of the mystery of Spearfinger. After being led to the mysterious red shed, which has long been at the heart of the Cherokee Devil investigation, they realize that there is something there they are missing. Willy and Wild Bill sneak back down to the rock overhang for a stealthy, nighttime repel recon mission. The team soon realizes that the key to their entire quest resides in both the rock overhang and the red shed.
60	10	"The Twisted Torch"	November 20, 2019
After Jeff is drawn away by a mysterious cloaked figure, the team searches for him and soon discovers a pair of old, finely crafted torches that shed light on the Cherokee folklore surrounding Spearfinger as well as making a very bloody discovery. It is a race against time to find what is hidden in the rock overhang that can finally reveal the mystery of Spearfinger.

=== Season 7: The Mission from Trapper (Tygart Valley Part 1) (2021) ===
No. overall	No. in season	Title	Original release date
61	Special	"A Tribute to Trapper"	January 3, 2021
The series is rebooted, the past episodes are no longer canon. The remaining members of the A.I.M.S team gather around a campfire to celebrate the life of team leader and friend John "Trapper" Tice. Tears are shed and laughter echoes throughout the Appalachian night sky as they relive their favorite Trapper moments.
62	1	"The Wolves of West Virginia"	January 10, 2021
The surviving members of A.I.M.S head out on a brand-new adventure that team leader Trapper set up for them before he passed. Equipped with Trapper's journal, they travel to the mountains of the Tygart Valley to prove there are still Wolves in West Virginia, legend has it that they were hunted to extinction in the region by 1900. While part of the team sets out to create an elaborate trap to catch the menacing predator, the others uncover a disturbing kill site. There might be something much more mysterious and deadly than wolves on the prowl.
63	2	"K-9 Tracks by the Grave"	June 27, 2021
A grisly discovery spurs the A.I.M.S team to find out what monster lurks in the shadows of West Virginia's Tygart Valley. Using Trapper's journal, they devise an ingenious way to get footprints to help identify the mysterious predator.
64	3	"The Red-Eyed Beast"	July 4, 2021
As a blizzard hits the Tygart Valley, the A.I.M.S team investigates Buck's encounter with a massive red-eyed monster. They risk life and limb to track the mysterious beast through the snow. Just what type of mountain mystery did Trapper get them into?
65	4	"The Great Skull Wall"	July 11, 2021
The A.I.M.S team sets out in the darkness to suss out the source of a monstrous roar that shook the hills and hollers of the Tygart Valley. As they close in on the monster, they hear a strange noise that leads them to a landmark unlike any other.
66	5	"What's a Smoke Wolf?"	July 18, 2021
The A.I.M.S team hunts for the source of a strange sound coming from the top of a sinister-looking tree. The search leaves them with more questions than answers about the red-eyed monster they've been tracking through the Tygart Valley.
67	6	"The Coyote Killing Massacre"	July 25, 2021
The A.I.M.S team enters No Man's Land in pursuit of the legendary "Smoke Wolves". The guys use a hunting trick from Trapper's journal to draw out the demon dogs, but soon realize they are treading on dangerous ground when they stumble across a pack of dead coyotes.
68	7	"Day of Wrath"	August 1, 2021
The A.I.M.S team finds a decades-old clue etched in stone by late team leader Trapper, leading to a shocking revelation about No Man's Land. Later, the guys track a trail of blood after they hear gunshots ring out in the Tygart Valley.
69	8	"The Den of the Smoke Wolves"	August 8, 2021
In the two-hour season finale, the hunt comes to a head when the A.I.M.S team locates what may be the secret lair of the Smoke Wolves. Jeff makes a special batch of Trapper's secret sauce to lure out the vicious canines. After concluding their most successful outing to date, Huckleberry shocks the team with a Bigfoot surprise.

=== Season 8: Tygart Valley Mysteries (Tygart Valley Part 2) (2022) ===
No. overall	No. in season	Title	Original release date
70	1	"Bigfoot or Bust"	January 2, 2022
Appalachian Investigators of Mysterious Sightings heads back to the Tygart Valley on a mission to prove that a massive Bigfoot roams those mysterious hills. A rumbling sound from deep in the hills gets the guys moving, and they stumble upon a strange tree structure.
71	2	"Cow-Killing Bastard"	January 9, 2022
Things heats up for the team when Buck realizes that the legendary "Grafton Monster" has migrated to the Tygart Valley. It's a monster hunt unlike any other when they stumble across the mutilated carcass of a cow. This episode returns some of the lore from before the season seven reboot, now it is unclear what is canon and what is not.
72	3	"Bloodbath in the Woods"	January 16, 2022
The A.I.M.S. team comes in hot onto a cattle farm after realizing the Grafton Monster is hunting livestock. They set off on a night-stalking mission to hunt for what they believe is the creature's most recent victim and encounter an absolute bloodbath.
73	4	"Huckleberry’s Monster"	January 23, 2022
Huckleberry reveals his family's terrifying brush with the Grafton Monster. Later, Jeff breaks out his "hillbilly hazmat suit" to do some bloodwork on an old dog collar. And Buck gets into a hellacious fistfight with locals under the moonlight.
74	5	"Trapper’s Birthday"	January 30, 2022
After a rip-roaring fistfight in the woods, the A.I.M.S. team gather together to remember team leader Trapper on his birthday. Huckleberry busts out a jar of his famous “Squatch Piss". Later, they enters The Land of the Fallen Trees to hot on the trail of Bigfoot after meeting an eyewitness who gives new information and drops a bombshell on the team. Their searching leads them to a mysterious den what seems to be the perfect hiding spot for a massive hairy beast.
75	6	"World’s Biggest Bigfoot Nest"	February 6, 2022
The A.I.M.S. team get a hot lead about a local hunter who claims to have found a massive Bigfoot nest hidden somewhere in the hills of the Tygart Valley. They are joined by superfan “Cowboy Ken” on a night hunt that brings them face-to-face with their most incredible Bigfoot find in team history.
76	7	"A Monster Turf War"	February 20, 2022
The A.I.M.S. team find themselves in the middle of a turf war between the Grafton Monster, Bigfoot and a pack of Smoke Wolves as these killer cryptids battle it out for territory. They soon discover that they are in a cryptozoic creature hotspot unlike any other. Later, the team heads deep into the Tygart Valley in search of the source of a mysterious rumbling noise that is shaking the hills.
77	8	"Rumble in the Hills"	February 27, 2022
With the moon in the sky, the search is on to find a lost brother when A.I.M.S. team member Willy goes missing somewhere in the haunted hills of the Tygart Valley. After hearing gunshots, the team make a shocking discovery and must evacuate Willy from the woods.
78	9	"1984"	March 6, 2022
The A.I.M.S. team heads out on a night hunt for Smoke Wolves in the middle of No Man's Land after encountering a herd of fleeing cattle and a mutilated calf. They then set off on a mission to find out what's going on with rumbling sound in the Tygart Valley hollers. The team learns incredible new information about Trapper that dates back to 1984, as Huckleberry blows the case wide open.
79	10	"Bigfoot on Camera"	March 13, 2022
After a sudden Smoke Wolf attack on a local’s farm, the A.I.M.S. team is in full force and on the hunt for these deadly canine cryptids. They meet with a familiar face who can shed light, once and for all, on what Trapper was doing in the Tygart Valley all those decades ago. The team makes an earth-shattering discovery with their best Bigfoot evidence in team history – one that no doubt has Trapper smiling down, proud of his Appalachian sons.

== Finding Bigfoot feud ==
On April 5, 2015, Matt Moneymaker of Finding Bigfoot tweeted that Mountain Monsters was scripted and the A.I.M.S. team were merely actors. "Trapper" John Tice responded to the tweet, denying that he was an actor and referring to Moneymaker's show as "Losing Bigfoot". The online feud has continued with Finding Bigfoot castmember Cliff Barackman chiming in that the show is "fiction" and the official Finding Bigfoot Twitter account calling Mountain Monsters a "fake-hoax" show in regards to the series' April 2017 return.
