= Telltale Lilac Bush =

100 folklore and ghost stories compiled by Ruth Ann Musick

- First edition cover
- Author: Ruth Ann Musick
- Publisher: University Press of Kentucky
- Publication date: December 31, 1965
- ISBN: 0-8131-0136-0

The Telltale Lilac Bush and Other West Virginia Ghost Tales is a collection of 100 folklore and ghost stories compiled by Ruth Ann Musick.

The tales surround ghost stories from around the Marion County area in northern West Virginia. A sequel volume, entitled Coffin Hollow and Other Ghost Tales, is also available and adds another 96 stories to the collection.

== History ==
The original book was published in 1965 as a hard bound book, while subsequent printings were paperback. The paperback version is still in print and widely available throughout Appalachia today. There are a variety of stories in it.

== Web series ==
There is a web series featuring stories from the books on YouTube. The series, produced with permission from the books' publisher University Press of Kentucky, ran for four seasons and 80 webisodes between October 2011 and May 2015.

== Theatrical adaptation ==
In October 2021, West Virginia’s Appalachian Artists Collective mounted a stage production, written by A.E. Gill, composed by Amanda Bridgett, directed by Leah Turley and assisted by Emily Basile, based on several of the stories in the collection. The play featured four ghosts traveling the hills of West Virginia in search of passage to the afterlife when they encounter a malevolent Peddler, to whom they have to pay their best ghost stories for tickets to the train that will take them to the great beyond, and a dramatized version of Ruth Ann Musick herself, who keenly listens and records their stories.

The theatrical adaptation, also titled The Telltale Lilac Bush, featured the following short stories:

- A Skeleton Hand, told by The Soldier
- Seven Bones, told by The Granny
- Rose Run, told by The Soldier
- The Telltale Lilac Bush, told by The Maiden
- The Old Horse, told by The Miner

The cast included:

- Ruth Ann Musick: Nora Ankrom
- The Maiden: Mariah Plante
- The Soldier: Austin Thomas
- The Granny: Terri Olson
- The Miner: Chris Terpening
- The Peddler: Cameron Vance
- Featured Dancers: Laurie Bohren, Cyndi Mac Fuller, Alondra Johnson, Rylanne Martin Jervis, Shelby Nelson Burcham
- Featured Vocalist: Ashley Miller
- Ensemble: Natasha Allen, Dr. John Campbell, Bryce Dale, Emilie Hoosier, Hannah Grace Epling, Isaac Ferguson, Emma Grace Hutchinson, Kate Kennedy, Doria Loftis, Aliyah Quinet, Clayton Strohmenger, Christin Wesley, Jenisis Carter, Cecil Cisco, JD James, Liberty Stepp

The creative team included Jessica Lynn Fox, Jacob Smith, Nora Ankrom, Mariah Plante, Matt Hitt, Ryan Kennedy, Loren Allen, Ryan Hurlbutt, Nikki Jervis, Jennifer Anderson, Emily Basile, T. Michael Murdock, Joanna Murdock, and Westley Smolder.

In December 2023, Marshall University's theatre for young audiences program, Theatre ETC! hosted a public performance of The Telltale Lilac Bush with Turley returning to direct. This version included an edited script omitting the musical aspects and changing the telling of The Old Horse to a new story, created by pulling several aspects from different short stories in the Mine Ghosts section of the anthology, such as Big John's Ghost, Section South Main, and the original The Old Horse. The production is set to tour West Virginia schools in Spring 2024 and perform at the Edinburgh Festival Fringe in Summer 2024.

The cast, in order of appearance includes:

- Ruth Ann Musick: Maggie Piaskowski
- The Maiden: Nikki Riniti
- The Soldier: George Kinley
- The Granny: Eliza Aulick
- The Miner: Gavin Spiewak
- The Peddler: Sam Phalen
- Ensemble: Camden Gleason, Kristen Scites, Van Preston

The creative team includes Jimi Lawson, Rory Johnson, Kendra Williams, Seth Cunningham, and Jalyn Teasdale.
