= Music (surname) =

Music is a surname found in the United States.

Notable people with the name include:

- David W. Music (born 1949), American composer and music professor
- Lorenzo Music (1937–2001), born Gerald David Music, American actor and producer
- Michalis Music (born 1999), Cypriot footballer
- Carla Lalli Music, American chef and author
