= Flatwoods monster =

West Virginian folklore creature

Gene Lemon and Kathleen May pose with a drawing of the Flatwoods monster – September 23, 1952

The Flatwoods monster, also known as the Braxton County monster, Braxie, or the Phantom of Flatwoods, is an alleged humanoid claimed to have been seen by a group of local residents in Flatwoods, West Virginia, on September 12, 1952 following the reported appearance of a bright light moving across the night sky. In 2000, paranormal investigator Joe Nickell suggested that the light was a meteor, while the creature may have been a barn owl perched in a tree whose shadows made it appear as a large humanoid figure.

== Claimed sighting ==
At 7:15 p.m. on September 12, 1952, in Flatwoods, brothers Edward and Fred May, accompanied by their friend Tommy Hyer, reported seeing a bright object cross the sky before landing on the property of farmer G. Bailey Fisher. The boys returned home and told their mother, Kathleen May. The group then travelled to the Fisher farm to investigate, accompanied by local children Neil Nunley and Ronnie Shaver, as well as Kathleen's cousin, West Virginia National Guardsman Eugene Lemon. The group reached the top of a hill, where Nunley said they saw a red, pulsating light. Lemon said he aimed a flashlight in that direction and momentarily saw a tall "man-like figure with a round, red face surrounded by a pointed, hood-like shape".

Descriptions of the figure varied. In an article for Fate Magazine, UFO writer Gray Barker described the figure based on tape-recorded interviews with the claimants. The alleged humanoid was said to have stood at a height of about 10 feet (3 m). A large pointed "Spade-like shape" surrounded a round, blood-red face, and eyelike features emitted a greenish-orange light. The body was purportedly either dark black or green. The group further claimed that the figure possessed "small, claw-like hands", clothing-like folds, and "a head that resembled the ace of spades". According to the story, when the alleged entity made a hissing sound and "glided toward the group", Lemon screamed in fright and dropped his flashlight, causing the others in the group to run away.

The group said they had smelled a "pungent mist", and some later reported nausea. The local sheriff and a deputy had been investigating reports of a crashed aircraft in the area. They searched the site where the figure was purportedly seen, but "saw, heard and smelled nothing". According to Barker's account, A. Lee Stewart Jr. of the Braxton Democrat claimed to have discovered "skid marks" in the field and an "odd, gummy deposit" the following day. These discoveries were subsequently cited by UFO enthusiast groups as evidence of a "saucer" landing.

The reported sighting received significant public attention. According to former news editor Holt Byrne, "newspaper stories were carried throughout the country, radio broadcasts were carried on large networks, and hundreds of phone calls were received from all parts of the country". The national press services rated the story "No. 11 for the year", while a Pittsburgh newspaper sent a special reporter to cover the sighting. UFO and Fortean writers like Gray Barker and Ivan T. Sanderson also visited Flatwoods to investigate. By the 1970s, the Monster began to become more popular as two of the original claimants, Freddie and Eddie May, began to "publicly embrace the encounter".

== Explanations ==
After investigating the case in 2000, Joe Nickell of the Committee for Skeptical Inquiry concluded that the bright light in the sky reported by the group on July 12 was most likely a meteor, that the pulsating red light was likely an aircraft navigation or hazard beacon, and that various aspects of the figure described by group resembled the anatomical features of an owl. Nickell suggested that the group's perceptions were distorted by their heightened state of anxiety. Nickell's conclusions are shared by a number of other investigators, including those of the Air Force.

On the night of the sighting on July 12, 1952, a meteor had been observed across three states—Maryland, Pennsylvania, and West Virginia. According to Nickell, three flashing red aircraft beacons were also visible from the area of the sightings, which could account for descriptions of a pulsating red light and accompanying red tint on the face of the figure.

Nickell concluded that the shape, movement, and sounds reported by group were also consistent with the silhouette, flight pattern, and call of a startled barn owl perched on a tree limb, leading researchers to conclude that foliage beneath the owl may have created the illusion of the pleated green skirt described by the onlookers present. Researchers also concluded that the group's inability to agree on whether there were arms, combined with May's report of it having "small, claw-like hands" which "extended in front of it", also correlated with the description of a barn owl with its talons gripping a tree branch.

According to skeptic Ryan Haupt, even though local boy Max Lockard admitted he had driven his Chevy truck around the site "hoping to see something", "paranormal investigators concluded that the tracks, oily residue, and bits of a rubbery substance must have been left by the creature and not the truck". Haupt explains the nausea reported by some of the group as a symptom "consistent with hysteria and over-exertion".

== Legacy ==
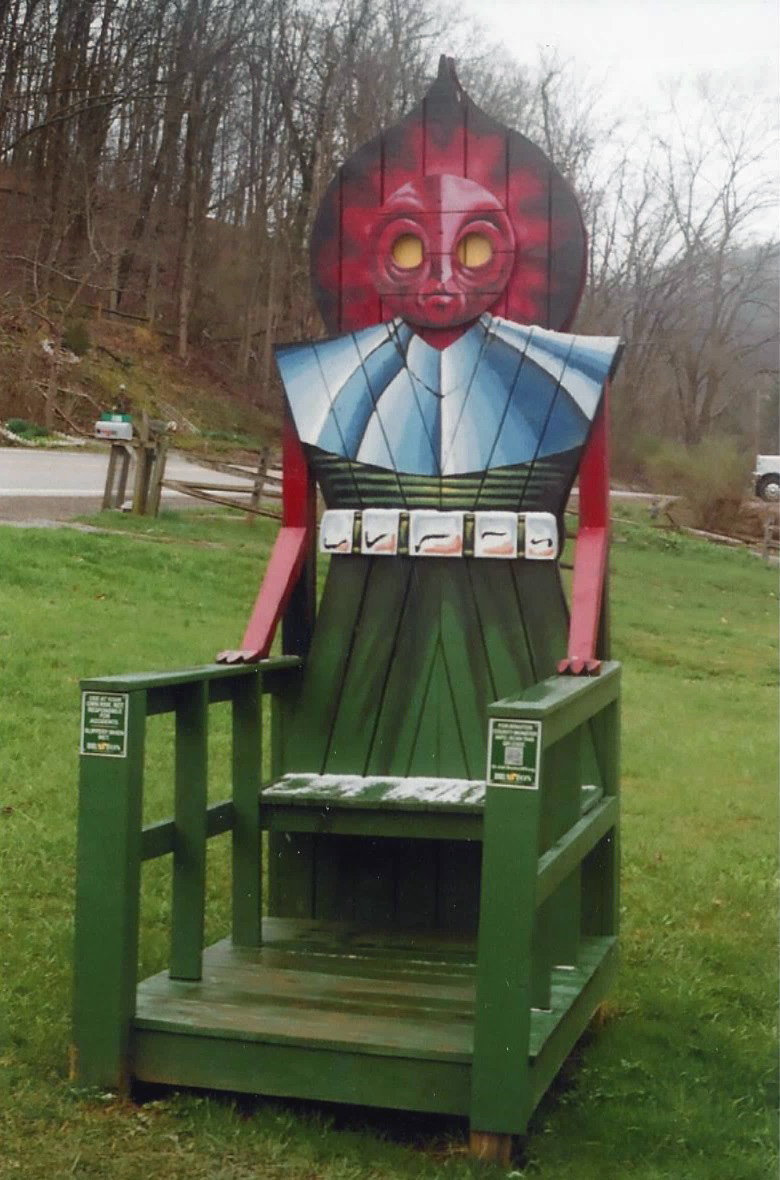
The Flatwoods monster chair welcomes visitors near the Flatwoods town hall

Officials in Flatwoods erected a welcome sign which designated the town as "Home of the Green Monster".

The Flatwoods Monster Museum in Sutton, West Virginia, is dedicated to the legend. The Flatwoods Monster Museum is open from 9:00 a.m. to 5:00 p.m. Tuesday through Friday, and 10:00 a.m. to 4:00 p.m. on weekends. The museum also offers free admission to its visitors. The Braxton County Convention and Visitor's Bureau also built a series of five tall chairs in the shape of the monster to serve as landmarks and visitor attractions. The Bureau rewards visitors who photograph all five chairs with "Free Braxie" stickers.

The legend of the Flatwoods monster has also inspired media beyond West Virginia. The video games Fallout 76, Everybody's Golf 4, and Legend of Zelda (2000) contain references to the legend.

In television, the second episode of the 2019 History Channel series Project Blue Book, titled "The Flatwoods Monster", is based on the Flatwoods incident.

Since 2019, Flatwoods has hosted the Flatwoods Monster Convention. The West Virginia Department of Tourism reports such creature legends and their associated festivals "helps massively with tourism, and it has shaped West Virginia to be so wild and wonderful". In 2026, Braxie was featured on a new West Virginia state license plate.

== See also ==
- Blenko Glass and the Flatwoods Monster
- List of reported UFO sightings
- Dover Demon (another sighting of an alleged humanoid proposed to have been a misidentified snowy owl)
- Kelly–Hopkinsville encounter (another sighting of alleged humanoids proposed to have been misidentified great horned owls)
- Mothman (another sighting of an alleged humanoid in West Virginia, proposed to have been a misidentified barred owl)
- Owlman
- Grafton monster
- West Virginia folklore
