= Multi-simulation coordinator =

Multi-simulation coordinator (MUSIC) is a software developed and released by the INCF and Royal Institute of Technology (KTH) School of Computer Science and Communication in Stockholm, Sweden. MUSIC is designed for interconnecting large scale neuronal network simulators, either with each other or with other tools. It allows spike events and continuous time series to be communicated between such applications in a cluster computer. The typical usage cases are connecting models developed for different simulators and connecting a parallel simulator to a post-processing tool.

MUSIC provides a standardized software interface (API) on top of the message-passing interface (MPI) for communication among parallel applications for large-scale computational neuroscience simulations. It enables the transfer of massive amounts of event information and continuous values from one parallel application to another, including those using different data allocation strategies. In the design of the standard interface, care was taken to allow easy adaptation of existing simulators and to permit third-party development and community-sharing of reusable and interoperable software tools for parallel processing. Three simulators currently have MUSIC interfaces: Moose, NEURON and NEST.

The MUSIC software library and its documentation are publicly available through the INCF Software Center.
