= John R. Musick =

American poet (1849–1901)

- Born: John Roy Musick; February 28, 1849; St. Louis County, Missouri, U.S.
- Died: April 14, 1901 (aged 52); Omaha, Nebraska, U.S.
- Occupation: Writer,
- Writing career
- Pen name: Benjamine Broadaxe, Ebenezer Slypole
- Genres: History, Historical Fiction
- Notable work: Columbian Historical Novels

John Roy Musick (February 28, 1849 – April 14, 1901) was an American historical author and poet best known for his Columbian Historical Novels.

== Early life ==
Born in St. Louis County, Missouri on February 28, 1849, the son of Ephraim and Mary Musick. While a small boy, his family moved to Adair County, Missouri where he received his education in rural schools. After graduating the First District Normal School (now known as Truman State University) in Kirksville, Missouri in 1874, he spent the next two years as a rural school teacher while concurrently studying law. He passed the Missouri Bar in 1876 and became a practicing attorney. By 1882, however, he gave up his law career to devote full-time to literature. Mr. Musick was also very active in Republican Party politics from his college days onward. It was his involvement in the successful 1896 presidential campaign of William McKinley that earned him the nomination to the post of Consul to Siam (present-day Thailand). He declined the honor, choosing to continue his writing career.

== Writings ==
While still a teenager, John Musick had several poems and short stories published, some under humorous pseudonyms such as Benjamine Broadaxe and Ebenezer Slypole. After devoting his full attention and livelihood to writing, he became quite a prolific author with some 139 works in 277 publications. His best known work is the 14-volume Columbian Historical Novels published in 1892 by Funk & Wagnalls. This series was hailed by world literary critics at the time as a bold step forward in the field of historical fiction as they explored the discovery and growth of North America through the use of fictional characters while paying strict detail to historical accuracy. John Musick's most personal work was without doubt In the Whirl of the Tornado published in Century Magazine (August 1899), a detailed account of a large deadly tornado that destroyed much of Kirksville in April 1899. Although his home was spared, Mr. Musick was badly injured while attempting to rescue neighbors from the debris. He never fully recovered from the injuries and died in Omaha, Nebraska on April 14, 1901. John Musick is buried in Forest-Llewellyn Cemetery in Kirksville.

== Selected bibliography ==
His prolific works include:

- Brother Against Brother; or, The Tompkins Mystery, New York International Book Co., 1887
- Calamity Row; or The Sunken Records), Rand McNally & Co., 1887
- Saint Augustine: A Story of the Huguenots in America, Funk & Wagnalls Co., 1892
- Estevan: A Story of the Spanish Conquests, Funk & Wagnalls Co., 1892
- Independence: A Story of the Revolution, Funk & Wagnalls Co., 1893
- Humbled Pride: A Story of the Mexican War, Funk & Wagnalls Co., 1893
- The Witch of Salem; or, Credulity Run Mad, Funk & Wagnalls Co., 1893
- Pocahontas: A Story of Virginia, Funk & Wagnalls Co., 1893
- Stories of Missouri, American Book Co., 1897
- His Brother's Crime, F. Tennyson Neely Co., 1898
- Crutches for Sale: An Osteopathic Novel, F. Tennyson Neely Co., 1899
- Columbian Historical Novels, Funk & Wagnalls Co., 1895, 1906 (Posthumous republication of series with two volumes unpublished at time of his death)
- The Real America in Romance (14 volumes), W. H. Wise & Co., 1908 (Posthumously published collection of earlier works)
