= List of alleged extraterrestrial beings =

This is a list of alleged extraterrestrial beings, alleged interdimensional beings, and alleged cryptoterrestrial beings that have been reported in close encounters, either claimed or speculated to be associated with the purported phenomenon of unidentified flying objects (UFOs) or hypothetical panspermic processes (not to be confused with the meaning of the term "alien species" in the biological science of ecology).

Flatwoods monster	In 1952 in Flatwoods, West Virginia, witnesses claimed to have observed a tall humanoid with a spade-shaped head. A common skeptical explanation has been a misidentified barn owl.
Froglike Humanoids: Harrison Bailey encounter; Loveland Frog	Rarely, witnesses have alleged encounters with amphibianlike humanoids. One recorded case from 1951 involved a steel-worker named Harrison Bailey, who purportedly witnessed a UFO and claimed to have communicated with diminutive, bipedal frog men in Orland Park, Illinois. Another famous case, though a UFO was not directly seen, allegedly occurred in 1955 in Loveland, Ohio, purportedly involving froglike humanoids engaging in what appeared to be communication with each other, one of whom was reportedly holding a rod overhead that was emitting flashes or sparks. Skeptics have suggested such sightings were the misidentification of known fauna.
Garson beings: "Garson invaders"	On 2 July 1954 in Sudbury, Ontario, a witness reported a rapid UFO and 13-to-15-foot-tall (4.0 to 4.6 m) beings, each equipped with three pairs of clawed or pincered upper limbs, three pairs of lower limbs, a single eye, and spurlike auricular protuberances. The witness claimed that a message was telepathically conveyed to him for dissemination, though stated that he refused to divulge it to anyone as he claimed it was too "horrible". A ufologist named Charles Beck reportedly interviewed the witness, speculating that the purported entity was the same as the Flatwoods Monster, a being that was said to have appeared in West Virginia two years prior. (Note: Beck appears to mistakenly draw more similarities than the eyewitness claims would otherwise indicate for the Flatwoods incident.) One speculative assumption apparently made at the time was that the Garson sighting was related to the planet Mars making a particularly close approach on 2 July. An investigating member of the Royal Canadian Air Force reportedly dismissed the story, explaining that it "didn't corroborate with anything of what it should be", although when pressed to elaborate on what the sighting should resemble, he allegedly explained that was "classified". Rumors began to circulate in the area of physical trace evidence, though local police asserted this was not the case.
"Giants": Mystery airship pilot, 1897; Meng Zhaoguo encounter; Voronezh beings	On rare occasion, alleged humanoids of prodigious scale have been reported. Modern accounts of giant humanoids at or in excess of 3 metres (9.8 ft) include that of the Voronezh beings in 1989, and later the humanoids described by woodcutter Meng Zhaoguo in 1994 in Wuchang, Heilongjiang. One notable early case was claimed to have occurred on 16 April 1897 in Reynolds, Michigan, during the "mystery airship" flap, wherein a purported being approximately nine and a half feet (2.9 m) tall was allegedly sighted in a landed craft, speaking in a melodic "bellowing"; however, historian and ufologist David M. Jacobs has suggested that some such accounts from this era may have instead been journalistic tongue-in-cheek pieces.
Greys (also grays): Roswell incident, 1947; Betty and Barney Hill, 1961; Betty Andreasson, 1967; Allagash abduction, 1976; Whitley Strieber, 1985; Ariel School, 1994	Greys are often reported to be humanoids of small stature, usually 1 m (3.3 ft) tall, featuring large hairless heads, black almond-shaped eyes, nostrils without a nose, slits for mouths, no ears, and 3–4 fingers on each hand (including a thumb). Tall greys have also been reported. Greys have been the predominant extraterrestrial beings of alleged alien contact since the 1960s. Skeptics commonly suggest that such reports are the result of sleep paralysis.
Hairy mammalian humanoids	In rare instances, hairy "mammalian" humanoids have been described. Though some encounters have purportedly involved beings with batlike faces, Bigfoot-like sightings are also represented in reports. An unconventional paranormal theory speculates that Bigfoot is of non-terrestrial origin. At least in the case of Bigfoot sightings, skeptics have proposed more earthly explanations altogether, such as the misidentification of bears standing on their hind legs.
Hopkinsville goblins: Kelly Green Men	Accounts of the Hopkinsville goblins, purportedly witnessed in 1955 in Kelly, Kentucky, near Hopkinsville, portrayed them as small, silvery humanoids with a "greenish-silver glow". A commonly proposed skeptical explanation is that they were misidentified great horned owls.
Humanoids alleged by Carl Higdon: "Ausso One"	Witness Carl Higdon alleged that he was abducted from Medicine Bow National Forest in 1974 and that his abductors were humanoids with strawlike hair, no eyebrows, no jaw, no visible ears, standing at about 6 feet (1.8 m) tall, and dressed in glossy black. They were notably sensitive to sunlight. The main individual described was characterized as a "hunter or explorer". The use of hypnosis to aid recall in this case has been called into question by skeptics.
Humanoids alleged by Colonel H.G. Shaw	In 1896 during the mystery airship wave, Colonel H.G. Shaw and a man named Camille Spooner, after having departed Lodi, California, claimed to have witnessed three thin beings with "large and lustrous eyes", small ears, a hairless head, diminished hands, and large quasi-simian feet who were covered in a delicate fuzz. Though the beings purportedly stood at a height of 7 feet (2.1 m), they appeared not to be greatly affected by gravity for some unknown reason and were, as a result, easy to lift when a small amount of upward pressure was applied during an encounter of mutual curiosity. The beings moved in a swaying motion and appeared to occasionally draw something from an unknown pouch with their mouth. Shaw allegedly marveled at their unusual beauty, and noted that the beings were grasping radiant ovoid objects. The witnesses looked on as the beings' craft, tapered at both ends and with a projection that resembled a rudder, rapidly departed. Shaw speculated that the beings were from Mars. Further, the alleged humanoids had, prior to departing, apparently attempted unsuccessfully to abscond with the witnesses which, despite the theory that the entire account may have actually been a satirical social commentary whose allegory has since been lost to history, led the lighthearted publication Guinness World Records to assert that it represents the "first claimed alien abudction".
Humanoids alleged by Evelyn Wendt: Dade City "flowers"	Witness Evelyn Wendt reported that in 1924, when she was a child in Dade City, Florida, she looked on as "animated flowers with faces where the bud would be" departed an egg-shaped object. She indicated that they were robotlike and noted they were of a smaller stature than her. This account was also featured in the skeptical compendium UFOs & Alien Contact: Two Centuries of Mystery; in his book review, skeptic Robert Baker assumed that encounters with unknown beings (like those cited in the book) may have been attributable to varying psychological explanations.
Humanoids alleged by Federico Ibáñez: Landing at Turis	In 1979 in Turis, witness Federico Ibáñez allegedly encountered beings approximately 1 metre (3 ft 3 in) tall draped in white, full-body garments resembling encapsulating chemical suits, wearing what appeared to be protruding eyewear on their heads. Skeptic Luís R. González and bibliographer Carlos González Gutiérrez have noted the similarity to humanoids from the then-recently released Star Wars. Skeptical researcher Vincente-Juan Ballester Olmos has likewise explored the notion that the encounter may have been a brief psychological phenomenon affected by pop culture influences, although admits that the witness ostensibly neither had any history of similar psychological phenomena nor particularly high awareness of the then-recent science fiction trend.
Humanoids alleged by Kelly Cahill	Witness Kelly Cahill alleged that she was abducted in 1993 from the Narre Warren suburb of Melbourne, Australia, and that her abductors were tall humanoids, dressed in dark hoods with glowing red eyes. Cahill further claimed that she perceived the intentions of the specific individuals she purportedly encountered as negative. Though it has been touted as a particularly noteworthy case due to the involvement of multiple and even ostensibly independent witnesses, the potential for the one-off event having a psychological explanation has been discussed.
Humanoids alleged by Pier Fortunato Zanfretta: "Titania" beings; "Third Galaxy"; "Dargos"	A night watchman from Italy named Pier Fortunato Zanfretta claimed to have experienced eleven abductions in the late seventies and early eighties, alleging that his abductors possessed yellow triangles for eyes and projections on the sides of their heads, as well as standing at a height of 3 metres (9.8 ft) upon clawlike feet. The hue of the purported beings' skin was described as green, their hands allegedly featured suction cup-like growths, and it was claimed that the abductors offered Zanfretta an item meant for ufologist J. Allen Hynek. Aside from the sighting of a UFO, which was remembered consciously, most of the details were extracted via hypnosis which, along with the use of sodium thiopental, skeptics have called into question.
Humanoids with a blue complexion: Blue men of Studham Common, 1967; Whitley Strieber, 1985	Uncommonly, beings with a blue complexion have been reported. One such report was made in Studham Common, where gnomelike, blue humanoids were allegedly sighted by children on the way to school in January 1967. Author Whitley Strieber, who purportedly had abduction experiences with greys, also claimed an alleged encounter with gnomelike, blue humanoids in the eighties. Like greys, skeptics suggest abduction reports of blue humanoids are the result of sleep paralysis.
Humanoids with a featureless face: "Faceless hunanoids"	Though alleged humanoids with a diminished set of visible facial features have been described, as was the case with a 1986 report from Santa Rosa, La Pampa, Argentina, purported beings with no recognizable facial features have also been claimed in the so-called Broad Haven Triangle region of Wales in 1977. A witness claimed to observe a saucer-shaped object as well as humanoids with tapered heads that were reportedly devoid of any discernable facial features. An investigating military officer, in his report to the Ministry of Defense, suggested the possibility that someone may have been pranking locals.
Humanoids with an "Easter Island" head	A mechanic, who had previously claimed to have witnessed two UFOs, one in 1962 and one in 1968, reported that he had offered a ride to a hitchhiker on Route 22 between Médanos and Bahía Blanca in 1972. The hitchhiker in question was reportedly 1.9 metres (6.2 ft) tall, possessing an unnaturally long face resembling a moai statue, though with a round nose. He was purportedly wearing a heavy coat, a hat or helmet with a diminished visor, and his presence correlated to ostensible electromagnetic effects observed in the vehicle. At the end of the journey, it was claimed that a UFO was observed, upon which, it was noted that the anomalous passenger had disappeared. This alleged humanoid was mentioned in The Field Guide to Extraterrestrials, a compendium of cases wherein author Patrick Huyghe's offered that a psychological explanation may exist for much of the phenomena his book covered, a suggestion also highlighted by skeptic Robert Baker in his review of the work.
Humanoid with compound eyes	In 1957, an individual who had worked for the US army asserted to journalist Ron Powell that he had been abducted from Salzburg in occupied Austria by an unknown humanoid six years earlier in 1951. He described the being as possessing compound eyes, a large and roughly cylindrical head, three fingers on each short arm, as well as a noticeably diminished mouth, nose, and ears. The witness further claimed to have been taken to another planet, stating: "We were approaching the red fields and I could see rivers with blue water in them. The rivers ran straight ... I remembered what I had learned in school about [Mars] being red with canals and it seemed to me that this must be Mars, although I wasn't 100 per cent sure because I kind of lost location of things when we had left the moon." However, this initial assumption could not represent such a hypothetical locale, as exploration of Mars has not only revealed the surface to be barren and the color the result of iron oxide, but also to possess a topography incompatible with famous 19th-century claimed observations of canali. (Note: The word canali, or "channels", was mistranslated into English as "canals", although the 19th-century claims even of channels have been widely deemed a misobservation.)
Humanoids with eyestalks: Betty Andreasson	Though Betty Andreasson is known for having claimed to have witnessed greys during her purported abduction on 25 January 1967 from South Ashburnham, Massachusetts, she also alleged that she was transported to a red-hued realm where she noticed exotic, vaguely anthropomorphic beings that were crawling on buildings. Ufologist Raymond E. Fowler offered the following summary of Andreasson's description: "The weird creatures were headless. They had two large eyes located on the tips of stalks that emanated from the top of their bodies, and the stalks moved independently of each other." The use of hypnosis in this case has been called into question by skeptics such as Philip J. Klass, who has asserted of hypnotic regression that: "Its validity in UFO abduction cases is questionable."
Humanoids with one eye: "Cyclops" of the Sagrada Familia neighborhood	In 1963, an alleged cycloptic humanoid of ruddy complexion that purportedly stood at a height of over 2 metres (6 ft 7 in) was claimed to have attempted to communicate with eyewitnesses in Belo Horizonte. Multiple cyclopes were reported in this alleged encounter. A documentary was released in 2022 about the incident titled Alien Cyclops: The Extraordinary Case of Sagrada Familia, according to which, the witnesses had maintained their testimony two years following the incident even as investigator Húlvio Brant Aleixo attempted to steer the follow-up interview into a more adversarial form of skeptical inquiry. The humanoids the witnesses reported were also referenced in The Field Guide to Extraterrestrials, in which author Patrick Huyghe's ostensibly admitted a certain degree of personal skepticism with regard to close encounters in the forward, opining that a psychological explanation might exist in general, which skeptic Robert Baker also touched upon in his book review thereof.
Humanoids with quasi-felid features	A compilation of accounts of stalled engines correlating with alleged UFO encounters was included in a series of documents released by the Australian Department of Defense in 2021, among which a case labeled 848 was summarized as follows: "Vehicles stalled in vicinity of brilliant, transparent mushroom-shaped object having occupants with cat-like faces. Quadrangular protuberance underneath." Skeptics have noted of other stalled engine cases that they could be described by prosaic phenomena.
Humanoids with round heads and a jesterlike ruff	In 1977, two alleged UFOs were observed by Lothar Schäffler (spelled Schäfler or Schaefler in different sources) at Lake Constance in Langenargen, Baden-Württemberg, Germany, and diminutive beings of unknown provenance were purportedly witnessed, described as humanoids wearing something akin to a pointed jester's ruff, as well as possessing round heads and inordinately long limbs with webbed fingers. The case received brief mention in Patrick Huyghe's The Field Guide to Extraterrestrials, a work that noted how its compiled cases could have psychological explanations, which skeptic Robert Baker also mentioned in his review.
Humanoids with "sweepers"	In November 1973, a witness in Uden, Netherlands, claimed to have seen a metallic spherical object and also claimed to have looked on as unknown humanoids, in garments similar to white monastic habits, used unknown devices resembling sweepers. A report was submitted of a similar being scaling a wall one month later in Vilvoorde, Belgium, and ostensibly another similar encounter later took place in Canada. Skeptical explanations have included misidentified utility workers.
Humanoids with winged forelimbs: "Avians"	Alleged encounters with humanoids of a generally avian appearance have also been rarely described, and have sometimes been broadly categorized with reports of humanoids with winged forelimbs in general, like those of chiropteran appearance. However, these classifications are of such a notable level of rarity that author Patrick Huyghe, who despite expressing a certain degree of skepticism about close encounters in general in the forward of his 1996 book The Field Guide to Extraterrestrials, admitted to only being able to find, while broadly compiling reports, one 1963 example of a chiropteran form in Hythe, Kent. Examples of avian humanoids have included the bird-beasts of Var, which were purportedly seen with a UFO in 1962, and also Mothman, which is sometimes speculated to have a non-terrestrial provenance. A chiropteran, or possibly quasi-pterosaurian, example lies in the 1903 account of the Van Meter Visitor, which was implied by contemporary reports to be cryptoterrestrial.
Humanoids with winged serpent (or crossed serpent) emblems: Herbert Schirmer encounter; William Herrmann encounter; Filiberto Cardenas encounter	On 3 December 1967, police officer Herbert Schirmer reported witnessing a UFO near Ashland, Nebraska, claimed to have experienced missing time, and later underwent hypnosis. He ultimately described a group of humanoids of below-average height, with large eyes and an emblem that resembled a winged serpent. According to journalist Crisnel Longino, "UFO researchers noted that similar symbols appeared in other reports, including cases from Latin America in 1969, Buenos Aires in 1972, [and] Provo, Utah in 1965". William Herrmann reported a similar encounter in the Charleston Metropolitan Area involving a winged serpent emblem in 1979, a few months after Filiberto Cardenas reported an incident near Hialeah, Florida, where, via hypnosis, he recalled witnessing unknown humanoids which, according to author Richard L. Thompson, had "elongated eyes with eyelashes, small flattened noses, long lipless mouths, and light beards". Further, a serpent over a "lazy X" emblem was described. Skeptics have questioned the use of hypnosis with regard to purported encounters in general, as in the case of Schirmer's hypnotic regression.
Humans (as occupants distinct from Nordics)	Authors like ufologist Thomas E. Bullard and skeptical researcher Susan Blackmore have both noted a distinction in reports between Nordics and "ordinary humans" among alleged UFO occupants. As with Nordics, the observation of ordinary humans among UFO crews and as ufonautical collaborators has been suggested to be the result of sleep paralysis. The claim of humans acting in this capacity is distinct from the New Age concept of "starseeds", the highly speculative, non-mainstream notion that a subset of humans represent reincarnations of non-human intelligences. Skeptics have suggested that the Forer effect may contribute to the popularity and proliferation of these ideas. Likewise, the concept is distinct from the theory of panspermia, a once fringe topic of scientific discourse, which in recent years has seen further interest by researchers due to the observation that the growth curve of genetic complexity over the course of natural history extrapolates backward in time to a point of origin that ostensibly precedes the existence of the planet, which has been suggested as evidence that early prokaryotic life may have originated from off-planet.
Insectoids: Praying Mantis Insectoids; Insectalin	This classification of alleged extraterrestrial is described as having an insectlike or mantid appearance. They feature in some purported abduction accounts, characterized as taking on a commanding role. As with other beings described in alien abductions, a common prosaic explanation suggested for sightings of insectoid beings is sleep paralysis.
Kofu humanoids	In 1975, two witnesses in Kofu near Mt. Fuji claimed to have witnessed a pair of saucer-shaped craft and a large-headed humanoid standing 1.2–1.3 metres (3 ft 11 in – 4 ft 3 in) in height without any visible facial features, save only what appeared to be elongated ears and three fangs. In their piece on the purported sighting, Kyodo News noted the Department of Defense's assessment that there was no evidence to suggest an extraterrestrial provenance for the alleged phenomenon of UFOs.
Jellyfish "UFOs"	In June 2026, an alleged aerial anomaly resembling an airborne jellyfish was sighted over Alaska. Proasaic explanations have ranged from a misidentified kite to balloons. Similar phenomena resembling atmospheric jellyfish have been reported at least back to the second half of the 20th century, as with the Petrozavodsk incident from 1977, which has been attributed to an optical phenomenon related to rocket launches that creates vaguely cnidarian-shaped atmospheric effects called "space jellyfish".
Little green men: Emilcin abduction; L. R. Johannis' encounter in Villa Santina in 1947	"Little green men" is a common shorthand description for extraterrestrial narratives in general, often used pejoratively by critics of ufology. Even though some purported encounters have referred to alleged beings with green skin, very few reports have ever involved anything that would fit the general description of "little green men". They are included here mainly for cultural reference to the term. As in the case with greys, skeptics suggest that the few such reports in abduction narratives are the result of sleep paralysis.
Living UFOs	Kenneth Arnold, the man whose 1947 Mount Rainier sighting helped coin the phrase "flying saucer" and usher in the modern age of ufology, speculated in 1955 that UFOs themselves may be living organisms, although a man named John Philip Bessor is generally credited as the first to propose this hypothesis six years earlier.
Men in black	One common theory for the identity of the alleged "men in black" is that of an extraterrestrial origin, due to reported anomalies in appearance and mannerism. Writer Benjamin Radford, though skeptical about the "men in black" phenomenon in general, stated: "It is of course possible that at some point dark-suited men from government agencies made inquiries into UFO reports; there was, after all, an Air Force program that investigated flying saucer claims in the 1950s called Project Blue Book. Government officials (including those with the military, police, Secret Service, FBI, or IRS, for example) are sometimes known to throw their weight around and intimidate people, even unintentionally." He did not, however, seriously consider the notion of MIBs as non-terrestrial entities aside from mentioning the hypothesis.
"Michelin Men": Bibendum entities	Rarely, alleged beings whose apparent pressure suits are reported to superficially resemble the Michelin Man have been described. These alleged beings were briefly mentioned in the book The Field Guide to Extraterrestrials, wherein Patrick Huyghe's listed them under the category of "short non-greys". Huyghe did express some degree of skepticism about the close encounter cases he'd compiled in general in the forward to his compendium and mentioned the possibility of a psychological cause, which skeptic Robert Baker also referenced in his review of the work.
Milnthorpe beings	A couple in Milnthorpe claimed to have witnessed beings with small trunks for noses and glaring, circular eyes in the summer of 1965. The story has earned acclaim in the village, although some locals have expressed skepticism.
"Mince-Pie Martians"	Small humanoids with large dark eyes, thin mouths, no noses, no fingers, no feet, and what were interpreted to be colorful oval-shaped wings were reported in Rowley Regis in 1979. Each purportedly wore a transparent helmet that emitted an uncomfortably bright light from the upper portion. They were claimed to have departed in an egg-shaped craft. There was no indication that the alleged beings were "Martians" in the literal sense; the first half of the name derived from the mince pies the witness reportedly offered them. The British government released files in 2008 that included a report about the UFO sighting, but they ostensibly assumed that the encounter with the beings themselves was a psychological phenomenon.
Miniature beings	Very small humanoids have also been claimed by witnesses, with one notable flap of sightings occurring in the 1970s and 1980s in Bukit Mertajam and near Kuantan, Malaysia, involving purported antennaed or horned humanoids that allegedly stood at about 3–6 inches (7.6–15.2 cm) in height. A corpse of a similarly-sized humanoid with alienlike features was discovered in the Atacama Desert in 2003, and found to have significant congenital anomalies. Although the biological indicators for the age at decease were a matter of some debate, the results of forensic genetic research have indicated that the corpse was that of a premature infant of human origin.
Mixed Lineage	Beings that appear to have mixed lineage between different alleged groups and/or with humans from Earth have likewise been reported. Ufologists have used the term "hybrid", and occasionally the term "hubrid" for particularly humanlike individuals, to describe these purported sightings. It is often alleged by witnesses that "greys" are heavily involved in this supposed genetic program. As with greys themselves, a common skeptical explanation has been sleep paralysis.
Non-humanoids (amorphous)	Although the vast majority of purported encounters are claimed to involve humanoids, there are occasionally miscellaneous and "exotic" types reported. The "Domsten blobs" are one notable example from 1959. Allegedly encountered in Sweden, they were described as "fluid", jellylike beings that purportedly attempted to abduct the witnesses. Some members of the Swedish Air Defense reportedly expressed skepticism about the account. Another, somewhat similar, case involved two entities that were observed by a pair of witnesses in 1971 in Palos Verdes, California, resembling bluish, limbless, disembodied brains with the dural membranes in tact. One alleged being was reportedly comparable in size to a human torso and possessed an unknown, glowing, reddish feature, while the other measured only the size of an "overgrown softball". Although the purported encounter was recalled consciously, missing time was noted, and one of the witnesses underwent the controversial practice of regressive hypnosis, where it was claimed that the beings had telepathically alluded to the existence of many others in the cosmos, some of whom were purportedly surveilling the earth, and further warned humans to engage in self-reflection to prevent atomic self-annihilation. Tall, gray-skinned humanoids with narrow yellow eyes and webbed, six-fingered hands were also described, assumed to be "crewmen". Though ufologist Ann Druffel, in her two-part article "Encounter on Dapple Gray Lane", spoke highly of the witnesses' credibility, she nevertheless noted room for skepticism about the account itself, admitting that it "might stretch credulity to the limit". Likewise, it was listed in The Field Guide to Extraterrestrials, a work that posited a potential psychosocial explanation to the many phenomena it covered. Skeptics have also called into question the use of regressive hypnosis in general, asserting that it is an unreliable method of inducing memory recall.
Non-humanoids (animal-like)	Animal-like, non-humanoids have also rarely been reported, one example of such an alleged classification was recorded by Jacques Vallée from a 1958 encounter in Niagara Falls, New York, where beings with four limbs, a tail, and cephalic appendages were purportedly sighted moving about a rodlike UFO. This case was featured in The Field Guide to Extraterrestrials, a book that posited a psychological explanation as a possible omnibus explanation for its extensive list of compiled CE3 claims in the forward. Another animal-like being was purportedly sighted in 2002 in the Villa San Rafael neighborhood of Calama, Chile, which was described by the witnesses as a telepathic, football-shaped (Note: In this case, the witnesses were referring to rugby football, not association football.) figure possessing a bulldog-like head, light red eyes, flat circular ears, and a mild glow. It was said to have hopped toward the witnesses, first quadrupedally and then bipedally, purportedly projecting the thought: "Don’t stare, and just run away." This sighting was also mentioned in the book Mysterious Creatures by George M. Eberhart under the chupacabra section, ostensibly due to the encounter having occurred during a wave of chupacabra reports in Chile. In their brief review of the book Mysterious Creatures, Skeptical Inquirer noted: "the criteria for inclusion as a 'mysterious creature' are perhaps too liberal, with some entries based on little more than one folkloric source..." Claimed abductee Betty Andreasson also described gliding organisms that resembled "a combination fish and bird" during her alleged encounter with greys, although in the case of the fish-birds, she did not allege a level of sapience exceeding that of an non-human animal. Andreasson's account has been called into question due to the use of hypnosis to aid recall.
Nordic aliens: Pleiadeans; Plejarens; Space Brothers; Subterranean Agarthans	Reported as strongly resembling humans from Earth, this alleged classification originally featured in the "space brother" contactee narratives of the mid-20th century, but continues to be described in modern purported abductions. Like greys and blue-skinned humanoids, skeptics suggest that abductions by "Nordics" are the result of sleep paralysis.
Octopoidal beings	According to a letter published in 1968, an unidentified object was reported hovering low over the ground near the village of Tivissa in the autonomous community of Catalonia. A pair of octopuslike beings was allegedly sighted, described as possessing either four or five legs. Their height was estimated at 1 metre (3.3 ft). Though other witnesses came forward to report subsequent anomalous activity in the area, the Barcelona-based ufological organization Centre d'Estudis Interplanetaris (CEI) reportedly could neither locate the author of the original letter nor any material evidence during their attempt to research the claims, which has led to increased skepticism surrounding the primary sighting.
Old Saybrook beings	In 1957 in Old Saybrook, Connecticut, a witness claimed to have seen 4-foot-tall (1.2 m) beings visible in the portholes of a 20-foot-long (6.1 m) craft. Though she reportedly perceived the presence of limbs, no hands were visible, and in the area where the allged beings' heads would be, the witness observed reddish-orange cuboid shapes with something akin to a reddish orb in the center. The sighting was mentioned in a list of Connecticut-based reports in a 1979 issue of Connecticut Magazine, the article of which included commentary by a researcher named Ted Thoben who suggested that single-witness cases in general could be more prone to unintentional observational error.
Pascagoula "mummies"	Described as mummy-like, the alleged humanoids that purportedly abducted the witnesses in the Pascagoula incident of 1973 were described as possessing wrinkly gray skin and having arms that ended in pincer-like hands. The mouths were reportedly diminished, while other facial features were claimed to have been sharp projections. The alleged beings' heads were described as attaching directly to the shoulders. They were said to be robotlike and moving with a gliding motion, legs together. As with other alien abductions, skeptics have suggested sleep paralysis as a potential prosaic explanation.
Plantlife, astrobotanical	Accounts of nonterrestrial plantlife have been noted in several alleged encounters, often when a witness claims to have been taken offworld. During the Salzburg encounter of 1951, the anonymous abductee reputedly found himself on a new planet looking out over a field of red sunflower-like flora. The witness said that although he wasn't sure, he assumed it was Mars based on his remembrances that he was taught the planet was red and had canals; however, his initial assumption is disputed by subsequent exploration of Mars that has revealed a barren landscape devoid of any vegetation or canal systems. Betty Andreasson likewise noted the presence of assumedly nonterrestrial flora during her alleged experience when she claimed to have been carried to another realm (or realms). Per Andreasson: "Plants are different. It's like ... long stems that come out in loops and the different colors. But they are green!" The use of the controvesial practice of hypnosis to encourage Andreasson's recall has been called into question.
Polymelic humanoids	In 1955 in the Casa Blanca neighborhood, now a part of Riverside, California, a group of quasi-polymelic humanoids was reported. Allegedly possessing four upper and lower limbs, large red eyes, a large red mouth, and four rhomboidal forms where a nose would otherwise be, contemporary newspaper coverage also touched on the observers' indication that the purported beings only reached a height of 3.5 feet (1.1 m) and were said to have some form of weaponry on their persons. Eyewitnesses further claimed that they were asked to climb a tree and await pickup. The alleged humanoids in this report were categorized as "apparitional" in The Field Guide to Extraterrestrials, a work in which author Patrick Huyghe's opined that a psychological explanation may exist for many of the cases he compiled, also discussed by skeptic Robert Baker in his book review.
Puntos de Luz Verde	In 1976, three soldiers in Badajoz, Spain, reported having heard an unusual sound as well as having witnessed an anomalous flash of light. Following these events, they further claimed to have encountered a long-armed figure measuring 3 metres (9.8 ft) in height that appeared to comprise "puntos de luz verde" (points of green light), near to where their military dog had previously refused to approach. Standing in a T-pose with blurred extremities, a metallic suit, and a glossy spherical helmet, the humanoid purportedly paralyzed one of the witnesses prior to that soldier's compatriots opening fire, leading him to assume that the being had saved him from so-called friendly fire. Ultimately, the alleged humanoid increased in intensity and disappeared down into a point. The three soldiers reportedly experienced symptoms consistent with radiation exposure afterwards. It was suggested by researcher Vicente-Juan Ballester that this sighting may have been the result of tension-based misperception.
Red Rain of Kerala	In Keralam in Southern India, a red rain event occurred wherein scientists noted the presence of what appeared to be microbial life sans DNA. Whether this represented a nonterrestrial panspermic event was questioned in subsequent years, due especially to the ostensible genetic anomaly. By 2013, a team of microbiologists reported that they had managed to uncover DNA in the samples, claiming: "Cellular impermeability to staining reagents due to the red pigment is the likely explanation for the failure of previous efforts to demonstrate DNA in red rain cells."
Reptilians (sometimes misspelled as reptillians): List of reptilian humanoids; Lizard Man of Scape Ore Swamp; Mt. Vernon encounter, 1983; Reptilian conspiracy theory	Described as tall scaly humanoids, reptilians (also called reptoids or reptiloids) comprise an alleged group often tied to niche conspiracy narratives, such as the reptilian conspiracy theory advocated by David Icke. Generally considered a particularly fringe topic, it also commonly overlaps with adjacent paranormal subjects like the concept of ancient astronauts. Historical depictions of reptilian humanoid beings date back at least as far as the mythology of Ancient Egypt, with the crocodile-headed river deity Sobek. Alleged encounters involving reptilelike humanoids that trend closer to classic close encounter narratives have also been reported, as is the case with Paula and Ron Watson who, in 1983, claimed to have encountered two beings with reptilian features and slender frames abducting a cow in Mt. Vernon, Missouri. Unlike Icke's conspiratorial framework, the Watsons reportedly did not ascribe an overarching malice to their alleged experiences.
Ririe humanoids	Two witnesses in Ririe, Idaho, claimed to have observed a pair of diminutive, 3.5-foot-tall (1.1 m) beings, possessing scarred or wizened faces, high-set ears of a markedly large size, small circular eyes, and diminished or nonexistent lips in late 1967. They were said to have been speaking in an indecipherable language, reminiscent of bird calls, and were reportedly carrying rucksack-like gear. Ultimately said to have departed aboard a zigzagging, saucer-shaped craft, police who investigated reportedly claimed to have found no sign of inebriation from the witnesses. This case was mentioned decades later in Patrick Huyghe's compendium of purported CE3 encounters, the multitude of which he suggested could possibly have a psychological explanation in the forward of his book.
Robots and objectlike beings: Georgia "stalks", 1951; Cisco Grove, 1964; Long Prairie "cans", 1965; Falkville Metal Man, 1973; Prospect, Kentucky, 1977; Paciência, 1977; Robert Taylor, 1979; Voronezh robot, 1989	Various alleged encounters have purportedly involved beings described as "robots" or "robotic". One such case involves the claim that figures shaped like "stalks of metallic asparagus" rescued a Piper Cub pilot following a collision with their rhomboidal craft in 1951. Another involves a hunter who attempted to evade apparent capture or contact by a purported robotic entity in Cisco Grove, California, in 1964 A third involves a witness in Long Prairie, Minnesota, who claimed to have seen diminutive figures shaped like tripodal "oil cans" performing maintenance on a vertically oriented craft in 1965; though police had assumed the witness had possibly seen something, they dismissed the idea that it was a UFO. A fourth involves a photograph taken of an anomalously fast, ostensibly robotic humanoid in Falkville, Alabama, in 1973. A fifth involves three objectlike beings, one of whom vaguely resembled a NATO E-type silhouette target, that were reportedly witnessed in Prospect, Kentucky, in 1977. A sixth involves 4-foot-tall (1.2 m) rotund robotlike entities sighted in the Paciência neighborhood of Rio de Janeiro in 1977, said to have possessed an antennaed spherical head with an equatorial band of mirrors, two handless arms that tapered to the width of a finger, and a single leglike projection that ended in a disk. A seventh involves a claim that spheroidal figures with projections departed a craft and attempted to abduct an eyewitness in 1979 in Dechmont Woods, Scotland. An eighth involves an apparent robot sighted among the ufonauts allegedly witnessed during the Voronezh incident in 1989. Skeptic Eric Wojciechowski has suggested the psychological hypothesis as an explanation for sightings of "robots" and other similar events.
Rods: "Skyfish"	Elongated visual artifacts appearing in photos and video recordings, sometimes claimed to be extraterrestrial beings, have received notable publicity. They are generally thought to be caused by the movement of flying insects exceeding the frame rate of recording devices.
Sandown Clown: All Colours Sam	In 1973 near Sandown on the Isle of Wight, two witnesses claimed to encounter a humanoid of unknown origin with unusual anatomical features, such as not possessing a neck, having slatlike arms, and triangular patterns for eyes. Said to somewhat resemble a clown in appearance, he purportedly invited the witnesses to his windowless, metallic hut, where there were notable anomalies in the way he ate. Neither the being nor the hut were found on subsequent searches. One skeptical explanation is that the individual the witnesses saw may have been a marginalized societal outcast with eccentric habits and dress.
Short non-greys: Marius Dewilde, 1954; Cennina, 1954; Bebedouro, 1969; Imjärvi, 1970	Some witnesses, as in the case of the Imjärvi incident of 1970 or the Cennina encounter of 1954, have alleged encountering short humanlike beings that are distinct from greys. "Short non-greys" were the most frequently listed category in The Field Guide to Extraterrestrials, a book in which Patrick Huyghe's discussed the possibility of a general psychological explanation for "close encounters of the third kind", which skeptic Robert Baker likewise touched upon in his book review.
Some cryptids: Bigfoot; Carmel Area Creature; Chupacabra; "Derry Fairy"; Dover Demon; Enfield Monster; Fresno nightcrawler; Grafton monster; Mothman; Vegetable Man	Some well-known cryptids have been occasionally theorized to have extraterrestrial or interdimensional origins or associations, although this is often dismissed by skeptics who allege more prosaic explanations altogether, such as the misidentification of known fauna (e.g. the snowy owl as a proposed explanation for the Dover Demon and the barred owl for Mothman).
Spacesuited beings: Solway Firth Spaceman, 1964; "Eighth Galaxy" humanoids, 2003	Alleged beings clad in spacesuits have also been reported, as in the case of Lech Chaciński, who described an encounter with figures wearing spacesuitlike attire near a UFO in 2003 in Szczecinek, Poland. An earlier incident said to have occurred in the region of Cumbria in the United Kingdom involved the capture of the Solway Firth photo, wherein a witness claimed to have noticed the unexpected presence of what appeared to be a spacesuited humanoid in the background of a photographic print of his daughter. Though the witness maintained that the anomalous figure couldn't have been his wife, journalist David Clarke has disagreed, suggesting that the witness had unintentionally captured a photo of his wife's back, and that the exposure was such that it created the illusion of a pressure suit.
Tuscumbia "Space Penguins"	In 1967 in Tuscumbia, Missouri, a farmer named Claude Edwards claimed to have seen 3-foot-tall (0.91 m) beings that resembled grayish-green penguins with either visors or widely separated eyes, no discernable hands, and a dimly colored beaklike projection where the mouth would otherwise be expected, a feature the witness reportedly claimed could have been artificial. Also alleging to have seen the purported beings depart in a mushroom-shaped craft, Edwards was reportedly hesitant to divulge what he thought he had witnessed to investigators.
Varginha beings	In 1996 in Varginha, Brazil, eyewitnesses claimed to have witnessed a diminutive being possessing oily skin, an inordinately large head, homogeneously red eyes, and forehead growths like bulges. A strong, unusual smell was also reported. The Brazilian military police suggested the witnesses had actually seen a local man who likely struggled with a mental health condition.
Voronezh beings	Three-eyed beings were reportedly witnessed disembarking from a UFO in 1989 in the city of Voronezh in the former Soviet Union. Each was purportedly shoulderless and had a small or nonexistent head, a hump, a disklike shape on their breast, metallic overalls, "bronze boots", and stood at 3–4 metres (9.8–13.1 ft) tall. An apparent robot was also reported. The use of a form of remote viewing by investigators to identify the alleged landing site was questioned by skeptics.

== See also ==
- Alien abduction
- Close encounter
- Conspiracy theory
- List of cryptids
- List of humanoid aliens
- List of UFO sightings
- Kosmopoisk (Russia)
- MUFON (United States)
- Ufology
