= Giant human skeletons =

Claims of giant human skeleton discoveries

Giant skeletons reported in the United States until the early 20th century were a combination of hoaxes, scams, fabrications, and the misidentifications of extinct megafauna. Many were reported to have been found in Native American burial mounds. Examples from 7 ft (2.1 m) to 20 ft (6.1 m) tall were reported in many parts of the United States.

The claims of "giant skeletons" were debunked in 1934 by Aleš Hrdlička, curator of anthropology at the Smithsonian Institution. The Smithsonian Institution opposed the popular myth that an "ancient white race" were the Mound Builders. The role of the Smithsonian Institution in debunking such claims led to a conspiracy theory that Smithsonian archeologists were destroying giants' bones in order to cover up the existence of giants.

Hrdlička blamed the reports of giant skeletons on the "will to believe" coupled with "amateur anthropologists" who were unfamiliar with human anatomy. In 2014 an internet story began circulating which claimed that the Smithsonian Institution had custody of giant skeletons but they destroyed "thousands of giant skeletons" in the early 20th century. The internet story about the Smithsonian was debunked by Reuters and the Associated Press.

== North American settler mythology ==
During the nineteenth century, there was widespread belief in North America of a prehistoric lost race. European settlers embraced myths of pre-Columbian settlements from the Old World, which reframed colonization as the continuation of a primordial past in which the roles of native peoples were diminished or dismissed. Through a process that historian Douglas Hunter described as "White Tribism", the settlers interpreted signs of "intellectual and cultural capabilities" in North American ruins, as signs of whiteness in their creators. Based on the legendary voyages of the Welsh prince Madoc, the earliest English settlers sought and failed to uncover evidence of a civilizing Welsh influence in native peoples like the Mandan. By the late eighteenth century, this paternalistic narrative had become strained, due in part to violence against the native peoples on the western frontier. White Americans developed the myth of the mound builder race, which provided a rationale for the colonization of the American Midwest. The various versions of the myth held that the massive earthworks of the Mississippi Valley, like Grave Creek Mound and the Great Serpent Mound, were not built by the ancestors of Native Americans, as is now widely believed. According to the myth, the Indians had exterminated a prehistoric, white race of mound builders. This cast genocidal violence towards the Native Americans as defensive or retributive. Josiah Priest's American Antiquities, released in 1833, crystallized the idea of a lost race—mentioned in the Book of Genesis—that created the monuments of North America before being exterminated by savages.

Between 1812 and the American Civil War (1861–1865), nearly all Americans writing about the continent's history used the myth of the white mound-building race. In literature, Henry Wadsworth Longfellow imagined The Skeleton in Armor (now accepted to be a native leader), as a lovesick Norse Viking eloping with his "fair" and "blue-eyed" lover. Sarah Josepha Hale accompanied her The Genius of Oblivion with end notes that claim "the ancient inhabitants [buried in the mounds] were of a different race from the Indians." Preachers taught a biblical basis for the primordial race, including connections to the lost tribes or the Nephilim, giants from the Book of Genesis.

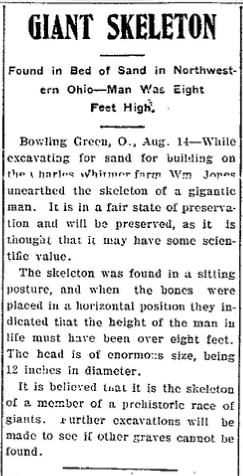
A typical example of nineteenth newspaper reporting on the unfounded and disproved mound builder race theory

In academia, the creators of North America's earthworks were conflated with the creators of Mesoamerican megalithic structures, then understood to be the mythical Toltecs. According to historian Christen Mucher, the Toltec connection facilitated the adoption of Spanish stories of a race of giants, like the 1519 account of the Tlaxcala leaders presenting Hernán Cortés with a massive bone, allegedly from a giant defeated by their ancestors. In New Views of the Origin of the Tribes and Nations of America (1798), naturalist Benjamin Smith Barton who was familiar with the legends of giants across North America and discoveries of mastodon bones, warned against interpreting the "discovery of bones, sculls, and entire skeletons of prodigious size" as evidence of prehistoric giants. Despite his warning, New Views would provide the basic framework for the Mound Builder myth and the later waves of giant skeleton reports. As more information was discovered about Native American cultural complexity, the lost race became increasingly described as physically superior giants. Con artist George Hull created the Cardiff Giant hoax after an argument with Henry Turk, a preacher who taught that the biblical giants had literally walked the Earth. PT Barnum commissioned a copy of the hoaxed giant, after a plan to have an 18-foot tall "skeleton prepared from various bones" failed.

Hundreds of newspaper articles credulously described the purported discovery of giant skeletons, sometimes with anatomical irregularities attributed to the Nephilim. For example, a massive skeleton unearthed in Tennessee toured the state as a specimen of this lost race. The reconstructed skeleton was mounted to a timber frame in a standing position with missing bones recreated from wood and rawhide. Preachers, doctors, and journalists confirmed it to "belong to the genus homo" despite a standing height estimated up to twenty feet tall. When the giant was taken to New Orleans, medical doctor William Carpenter found it to be a young mastodon's remains. Carpenter reported that there was not fraud—the man exhibiting the bones boxed them up after discovering they were not human—but rather a widespread desire to believe. The mastodon ceased to be exhibited as a person, but soon other purported giants were unearthed, exhibited, reported, or sold for profit.

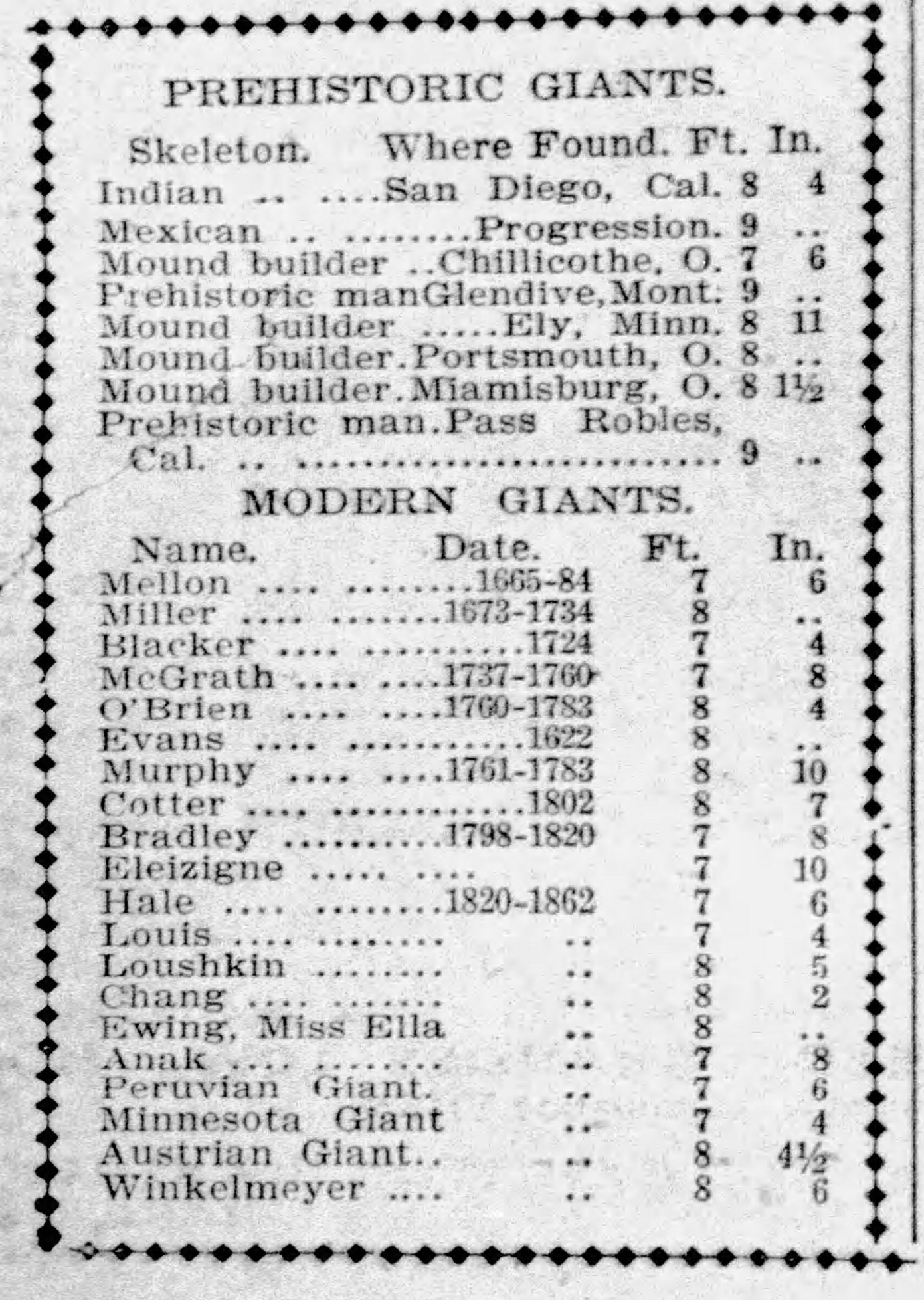
Even after the Smithsonian had proved the mound builders to be Native Americans, the popular press continued to publish accounts of the prehistoric lost race, like this table published by the Omaha World-Herald in 1900. Comparing the heights of various alleged giants (from 7 to 9 feet tall), it labels "Indian" as a separate people from "Mound Builder" or "Prehistoric".

Throughout the 19th century, some scholars expressed doubt about the excavations of purported giants but had little impact on public perception. Many readers embraced the skeletons as evidence of biblical history, against unpopular experts whose discoveries undermined a literal interpretation of the bible. With a rise in white literacy rates and the emergence of the cheaper penny press newspapers, there was a strong market for these tales that gave them greater impact than university scholarship. Stories frequently ran presenting as straight fact: hoaxes, scams, and misinterpretations of extinct megafauna. Some newspapers outright fabricated stories. The St. Louis Evening Chronicle published the account of researchers who explored a subterranean city beneath Moberly, Missouri. The account described massive underground streets where a skeleton—three times larger than a typical human—was found slumped over a public fountain. Other newspapers reported the Moberly claims as factual and republished the entire story including implausible details like the researcher who, upon drinking from the skeleton's fountain, described the water as "very sweet and nice".

Ethnologist Cyrus Thomas spent years compiling his Report on the Mound Explorations for the Smithsonian Institution. The 1894 in-depth study on North America's earthworks provided over seven hundred pages of conclusive evidence that they were built by native peoples. Thomas' report shifted academic attitudes but news reports of giant skeletons continued to come out for decades afterward. While this report included two references to skeletons believed to have been in excess of 7 feet tall (pages 362 and 425-426), these were anomalies thus explaining why they were deemed significant enough to warrant specific mention. It was common for the stories to claim that the bones were sent to the Smithsonian Institution. The Smithsonian's Bureau of Ethnology did encourage those excavating mounds, to send Native American bones to their Mound Exploration Division. Prior to the 1990 Native American Graves Protection and Repatriation Act, the Smithsonian collected over 18,000 of these skeletons. However, the sensationalist newspaper articles were often invoking the Smithsonian's name in order to lend credibility. As late as 1950, Paxson Hayes was featured for his claim that "blonde giants" once lived in the Americas. Paxson's claims were repeated in Frank Scully's 1950 book Behind the Flying Saucers and the writings of Meade Layne.

== Debunking claims ==
In 1934, Aleš Hrdlička, curator of anthropology at the Smithsonian Institution rejected the existence of a race of giants between 7 to 8 ft (2.1 to 2.4 m) tall. Hrdlička blamed the "will to believe" for the many reports of giant "discoveries". Hrdlička blamed amateur anthropologists for being fooled by the bones. He stated that people were most often fooled by the length of the femur bone because they are often not familiar with human anatomy. Hrdlička also stated that reports of giant skeletons occurred two or three times per month.

In 2020 The Columbus Dispatch reported that archeologist, Donald Ball collected articles about giant skeletons, which were purportedly found in burial mounds dating as far back as 1845. He determined that when the claims about giant skeletons were scrutinized they did not reveal giant skeletons. One story in the Indianapolis Journal reported on August 29, 1883, that a 9 ft (2.7 m) skeleton had been found. Dr. M. M. Adams investigated and concluded that the bones were "not of a giant" and the individual was not "above five feet eight inches in height". He determined that it was a "giant fraud" upon the people.

=== Internet hoax ===
In 2014, an internet story reported that the Smithsonian Institution had custody of many giant skeletons and destroyed "thousands of giant skeletons" in the early 1900s. Reuters determined that the origin of the story was a satirical website called World News Daily Report. A spokesperson for the Smithsonian confirmed that the story was not true. The satirical story claimed that the American Institution of Alternative Archaeology accused the Smithsonian of a coverup. The Associated Press also investigated and determined that the story was false.

=== Giant of Castelnau ===
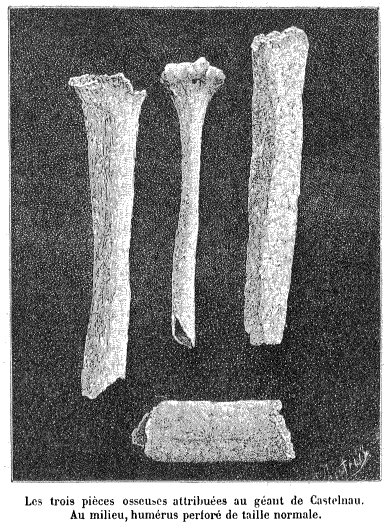
Three bone fragments of the named "Giant of Castelnau" compared to a regular-size humerus (center), according to Georges Vacher de Lapouge.

"Giant of Castelnau" refers to three bone fragments (a humerus, tibia, and femoral mid-shaft) discovered by Georges Vacher de Lapouge in 1890 in the sediment used to cover a Bronze Age burial tumulus, and dating possibly back to the Neolithic. Lapouge determined that the fossil bones may belong to one of the largest humans known to have existed. However, in 2022, Katherine Hacanyan asserted that this discovery by Lapouge was most likely a cave bear and not a human, in an undergraduate student paper detailing her examination of photos of the bones. However, one issue with Hacanyan's paper is that the cave bear was not extant in the Neolithic. Giant skeletons of animals were often mistaken for giant human bones during previous centuries and during the early 20th century. This was due to a lack of expertise in human bone structure by those who discovered the bones. Also, some discoveries were intentionally misrepresented for various reasons.

=== 1984 study ===
In 1984, the anthropologist Sheilagh Brooks examined the Reid Collection, an assemblage of Native American skeletons unearthed in Nevada by John Reid in the early 1900s which was said to contain an individual that measured 9 ft 6 in (2.90 m). However, Brooks found that no skeleton measured more than 5 ft 11 in (1.80 m). Brooks concluded that since Reid estimated the heights of these skeletons by measuring their femurs against his thigh, his overestimate likely occurred because he was unaware that the head of the femur is inserted in the pelvic socket and does not extend outward.

=== 2024 study ===
In 2019, the Travel Channel series Code of the Wild aired an episode in which a pre-Columbian skeleton was presented that was allegedly 7 feet tall and Salasaca storytellers were interviewed that related oral traditions of giants.

In 2024, Nicholas Landol used mathematical formula to determine that the individual was actually only between 153.34 cm and 162.37 cm (just over 5 feet), and that due to the disarticulation that a skeleton experiences after death, a skeleton can appear larger than it is. As this was only one sample, they also wrote that "Future analysis remains essential, however, to the evaluation of the Indigenous oral traditions of Ecuador".

== Similar hoaxes outside the United States ==
The fact-checking website Snopes records similar hoaxes in Saudi Arabia and India.
