= List of aliens =

List of aliens may refer to:

- List of alleged extraterrestrial beings
- List of fictional extraterrestrials
- Lists of invasive species
