= Dover Demon =

Alleged being sighted in Dover, Massachusetts, USA

Bill Bartlett's original sketch of the Dover Demon

The Dover Demon is a cryptid claimed by three teenagers to have been seen on April 21–22, 1977, in Dover, Massachusetts, a town approximately 15 miles (24 km) southwest of Boston. Police said that the descriptions provided by the teenagers were "probably nothing more than a school vacation hoax", while researchers have suggested the possible misidentification of local fauna. The descriptions have been compared to those of alleged close encounters.

== Alleged sightings ==
While driving along Farm Street in Dover, Massachusetts on April 21, 1977, seventeen-year-old William "Bill" Bartlett reported seeing an unknown being approximately 4 feet (1.2 m) tall, which he claimed possessed glowing orange eyes, lacked a visible nose or mouth, and had a watermelon-shaped head. According to Bartlett, the figure was perched atop a broken stone wall. That same evening, 15-year-old John Baxter reported seeing something similar on Miller Hill Road. The following night, another 15-year-old, Abby Brabham, claimed to have encountered the being on Springdale Avenue, although she described green eyes.

The three teenagers each produced sketches of what they claimed to have seen. Bartlett accompanied his drawing with the statement, "I, Bill Bartlett, swear on a stack of Bibles that I saw this creature." A local news report noted that the locations of the alleged sightings, when plotted on a map, formed a straight line extending for more than 2 miles (3.2 km). The sightings did not become public until the first half of May. At the time, cryptozoologist Loren Coleman said he thought it was similar to the Kelly–Hopkinsville encounter of 1955. Although none of the witnesses reported seeing a UFO, the sightings were investigated by the Mutual UFO Network and other associated organizations.

== Possible explanations ==
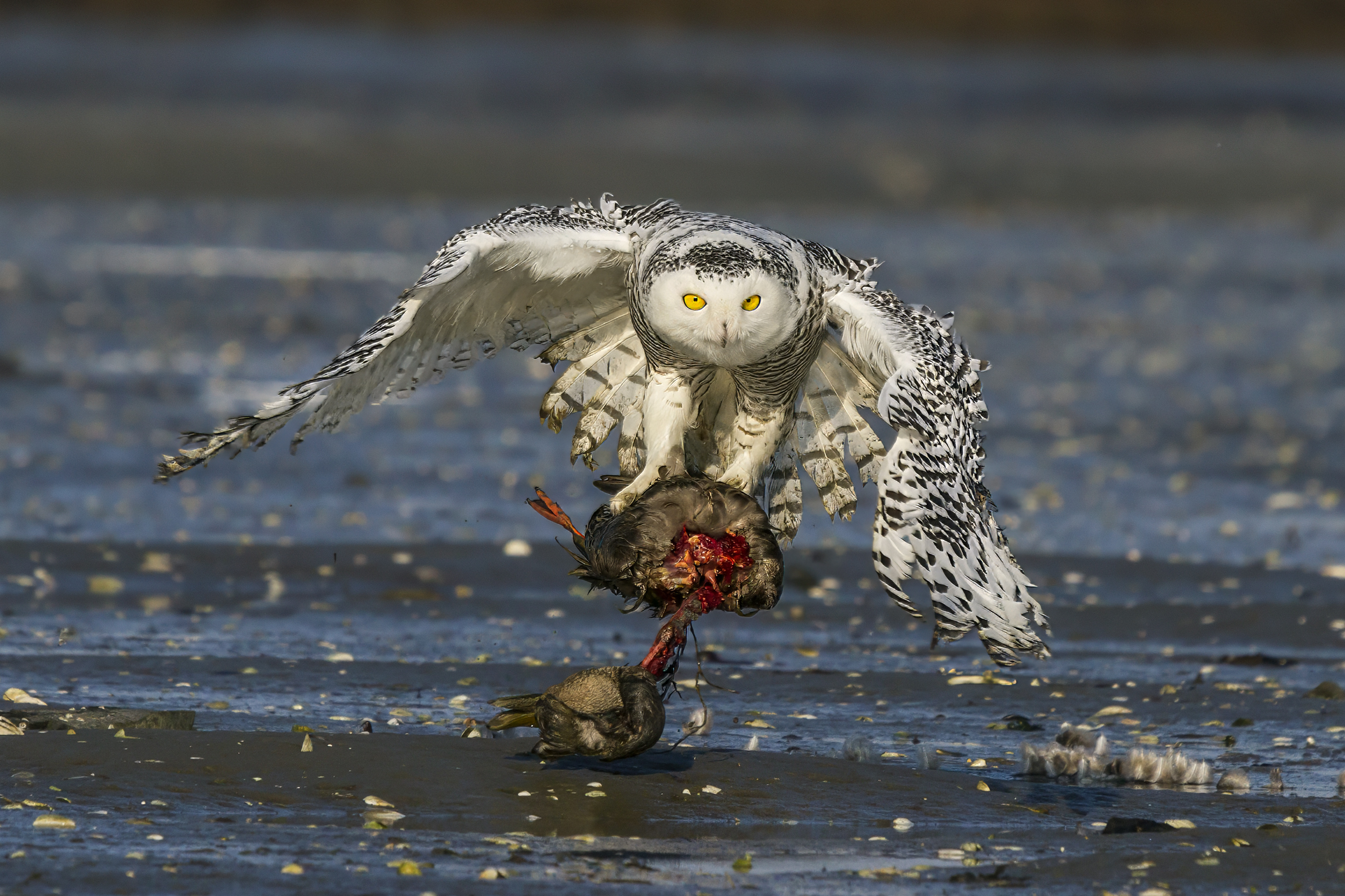
A snowy owl, carrying prey

Some explanations have proposed that what the witnesses may have actually seen was a foal or moose calf. Skeptic Joe Nickell suggested that a snowy owl could account for the reported sightings. (Note: One proposed explanation of the aforementioned Kelly–Hopkinsville encounter is a great horned owl.) He speculated that the owl's plumage may have reflected the yellow headlights of older automobiles, producing the peach-colored appearance described by Bartlett. Furthermore, the "long spindly arms" and fingers that were reported could have been the partially extended wings and splayed feathers at the wingtips of a snowy owl. Skeptic Brian Dunning disagreed with the snowy owl explanation, stating: "Yes, granted, a person might look at a snowy owl in the right conditions and they could think they're seeing something that looks like what these teens drew. But if it happened to four people in town in just 24 hours, it must be a very compelling illusion. Yet the illusion never fooled anyone, ever, before or since." Nevertheless, Dunning remained convinced that a prosaic explanation existed that could explain the sighting.

Police told the Associated Press that the descriptions provided by the teenagers were "probably nothing more than a school vacation hoax". Skeptic Ben Radford has suggested that popular culture may have influenced the sightings, noting that 1977 saw the release of Star Wars and Close Encounters of the Third Kind, although Brian Dunning disagreed, at least regarding the latter film, stating: "I discount this, as the movie was released a full eight months after the Dover Demon sightings." Dunning went on to say:

Just to be clear, I'm not calling the kids liars. Nothing unusual having happened is simply our null hypothesis, our default assumption, in the lack of any compelling evidence to the contrary. The alternatives all range from illogical to completely implausible.

== In popular culture ==
In 2009, the Dover Demon was featured in an episode of the American horror television series Lost Tapes, which aired on Animal Planet.

The Dover Demon appears as a character in an American comic book series that features various cryptids called Proof, in which the being is able to see into the future. Another similar comic book series called The Perhapanauts also features the Dover Demon. Brief appearances can also be found in the comic books The Pound: Ghouls Night Out and Hack/Slash: Entry Wound. A Dover Demon also appears in the webcomic Gunnerkrigg Court.

The manga and anime series Dandadan features an alien character called a Dover Demon. Its appearance is significantly different from the original sightings, being a bipedal crustacean-like alien with the ability to transform into a stronger form resembling a mantis shrimp.

== See also ==
- Flatwoods monster (another sighting of an alleged humanoid proposed to have been a misidentified barn owl)
- Kelly–Hopkinsville encounter (another sighting of alleged humanoids proposed to have been misidentified great horned owls)
- Mothman (another sighting of an alleged humanoid in West Virginia, proposed to have been a misidentified barred owl)
- Grey alien
