= Enfield, Illinois =

Enfield
- Village
- Location of Enfield in White County, Illinois.
- Coordinates: 38°06′03″N 88°20′17″W
- Country: United States
- State: Illinois
- County: White

Area
  - Total: 1.01 sq mi (2.62 km^{2})
  - Land: 1.01 sq mi (2.62 km^{2})
  - Water: 0 sq mi (0.00 km^{2})
- Elevation: 479 ft (146 m)

Population (2020)
  - Total: 794
  - Density: 785.4/sq mi (303.26/km^{2})
- Time zone: UTC-6 (CST)
  - Summer (DST): UTC-5 (CDT)
- ZIP code: 62835
- Area code: 618
- FIPS code: 17-24179
- GNIS ID: 2398835

Enfield is a village in White County, Illinois, United States. The population was 596 at the 2010 census, which rose to 794 in the 2020 Census.

== Geography ==
According to the 2010 census, Enfield has a total area of 1.19 square miles (3.08 km^{2}), all land.

== Demographics ==
Historical population
| Census | Pop. | Note | %± |
|---|---|---|---|
| 1880 | 717 | | — |
| 1890 | 870 | | 21.3% |
| 1900 | 971 | | 11.6% |
| 1910 | 927 | | −4.5% |
| 1920 | 929 | | 0.2% |
| 1930 | 744 | | −19.9% |
| 1940 | 875 | | 17.6% |
| 1950 | 906 | | 3.5% |
| 1960 | 791 | | −12.7% |
| 1970 | 764 | | −3.4% |
| 1980 | 890 | | 16.5% |
| 1990 | 683 | | −23.3% |
| 2000 | 625 | | −8.5% |
| 2010 | 596 | | −4.6% |
| 2020 | 794 | | 33.2% |
U.S. Decennial Census

As of the 2000 United States census, there were 625 people, 262 households, and 157 families residing in the village. The population density was 538.8 inhabitants per square mile (208.0/km^{2}). There were 293 housing units at an average density of 252.6 per square mile (97.5/km^{2}). The racial makeup of the village was 98.56% White, 0.16% African American, 0.32% Native American, 0.16% Asian, 0.16% from other races, and 0.64% from two or more races. Hispanic or Latino of any race were 0.16% of the population.

There were 262 households, out of which 26.3% had children under the age of 18 living with them, 49.6% were married couples living together, 9.2% had a female householder with no husband present, and 39.7% were non-families. 34.7% of all households were made up of individuals, and 20.6% had someone living alone who was 65 years of age or older. The average household size was 2.17 and the average family size was 2.79.

In the village, the population was spread out, with 19.8% under the age of 18, 7.4% from 18 to 24, 22.2% from 25 to 44, 25.3% from 45 to 64, and 25.3% who were 65 years of age or older. The median age was 46 years. For every 100 females, there were 77.6 males. For every 100 females age 18 and over, there were 75.2 males.

The median income for a household in the village was $23,750, and the median income for a family was $34,125. Males had a median income of $31,042 versus $17,500 for females. The per capita income for the village was $13,455. About 17.4% of families and 24.7% of the population were below the poverty line, including 32.5% of those under age 18 and 12.0% of those age 65 or over.

== Notable person ==
- Lefty Jamerson, pitcher for the Boston Red Sox

== See also ==
- The Enfield Monster
