= Paxson Hayes =

American pseudohistorian (1892–1952)

Charles Paxson Hayes
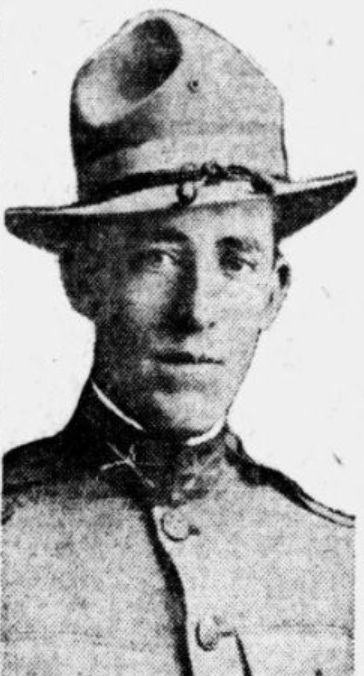
- Hayes in 1917
- Born: July 27, 1892; Omaha, Nebraska
- Died: September 7, 1952 (aged 60)
- Other names: Paxson C. Hayes
- Spouses: Florence May Looy (m. July 27, 1916; ended by 1939)
- Parents: Dr. Charles Winslow Ainsworth Hayes (father); Mary E Paxson (mother)

Charles Paxson Hayes (July 27, 1892 – September 7, 1952) was a minor media figure in the early 20th century, described as an "explorer" in American press. A noted reptile enthusiast, Hayes spread pseudohistorical tales of giants living in prehistoric America. Hayes's claims were later incorporated into the writings of influential flying saucer conspiracy theorists including Meade Layne and Frank Scully.

== Early life ==
Paxson Hayes was born on July 27, 1892 in Omaha, Nebraska, the son of physician Charles Winslow Ainsworth Hayes and wife Mary E. Paxson Hayes. He graduated from Omaha's Central High School. In 1916, his mother was featured in a book of notable Nebraska women. On May 6, 1917, Hayes joined the military, serving as a Lieutenant in the Sixth Nebraska Infantry. On July 27, 1916, he married Florence May Looy in Atlantic City. In 1927, he filed a suit against Lola Edna Hayes.

== Career ==
Beginning in 1930, newspapers nation-wide began covering Hayes. That year, his story of an "expedition" to Mexico and having a cracked rib from an encounter with a boa constrictor made headlines. He was profiled in 1932 for his reptile colony and interest in gliding snakes.

On January 27, 1935, the New York Times and numerous other publications featured Hayes's claims of discovering an ancient city in Sonoora, Mexico. In 1937, he gave a talk on his theory of an ancient race of "supermen". In 1938, his boat suffered motor failure in the Chesapeake Bay and his wife reported him missing to the Coast Guard. In January 1939, papers covered a case in court when Hayes was sued by a woman who claimed she sold her beauty shop and gave the money to Hayes to purchase a yacht for a honeymoon expedition to the Yucatan. Once aboard, Hayes declined to marry her; The admiralty court ruled for Hayes, noting its limited jurisdiction.

In 1941, he gave lectures on reptiles in Florida, including one to Boy Scouts. In 1950, he was featured for his promotion of the long-discredited claim that "blonde giants" once lived in the Americas. Paxson's claims were repeated in Frank Scully's 1950 book Behind the Flying Saucers and the writings of Meade Layne.

Hayes died on September 7, 1952.
