= Enfield Monster =

1973 unidentified creature

The Enfield Monster is an unidentified creature reported around Enfield, Illinois, United States in April 1973. The reports were covered by the news media at the time, with some suggesting they may have been caused by a wild ape or escaped kangaroo.

Used as a case study for a paper on social contagion in 1978, the episode is cited by sociologists as an example of collective behavior where a group or crowd can be affected by the spread of "group emotions" such as "panics, hysterias, collective visions, and extreme instances of suggestibility."

== Reports ==
At about 10pm on the night of April 25, 1973, Henry McDaniel heard a scratching sound at his front door. He looked out and saw something that he thought might be a bear. Taking a gun and flashlight, he headed outside into a strong wind and saw a creature between two rosebushes. He later said "It had three legs on it, a short body, two little short arms, and two pink eyes as big as flashlights. It stood four and a half feet tall and was grayish-colored." He added later that it was "almost like a human body".

McDaniel fired four shots at the creature, one shot hitting it and causing it to make a hiss "much like a wildcat's", before fleeing towards a nearby railway embankment, covering fifty feet in three jumps. McDaniel called the local authorities who discovered footprints in the soft earth near the house, which McDaniel described as dog-like in shape, with six toe pads. The police considered McDaniel to be "rational and sober" in his reporting of the incident. In a later press interview, McDaniel said "If they do find it, they will find more than one and they won't be from this planet, I can tell you that."

Investigators interviewing nearby residents were told that Greg Garrett, a ten-year-old neighbor of McDaniel, claimed to have encountered the creature half an hour before McDaniel did, and that the creature had stepped on his feet, tearing his tennis shoes to shreds. The boy later told Western Illinois University researchers that his report was a hoax "to tease Mr. M and have fun with an out of town newsman."

Two weeks later on May 6, McDaniel called the radio station WWKI claiming to have seen the creature again, at 3 a.m. that morning. It was negotiating the trestles of the railroad tracks near his home, and McDaniel said "I saw something moving out on the railroad track and there it stood. I didn't shoot at it or anything. It started on down the railroad track. It wasn't in a hurry or anything." A search party including WWKI's news director Rick Rainbow explored the area later that day, and reported observing an "apelike" creature standing in an abandoned building near McDaniel's house. They claimed to have made a recording of the creature's cries, and fired a shot at it before it fled. Cryptozoologist Loren Coleman investigated the case and the sound recording.

Two days later, a day after McDaniel was interviewed on local radio, the local press reported that police were called to investigate reports of gunfire and arrested five young men from out of town who had come to Enfield in order to photograph the creature, carrying shotguns and rifles "for protection", the men having claimed to have sighted the creature. The White County sheriff dismissed reports of this "monster hunting expedition" as an exaggeration, saying that the men were just "out drinking and raising hell", mentioning the monster only briefly during questioning. The men were charged with hunting violations.

== Reactions ==
The incidents were reported widely in the press at the time – it appeared in newspapers throughout the state on 27 April 1973, and on 7 May there was an interview on radio station WGN, Chicago and articles in the Chicago Daily News, the Moline Dispatch, Champaign-Urbana Courier and the Alton Telegraph. There were earlier articles in the Carmi Times, and an updated summary of the events appeared in Pennsylvania's Reading Eagle in August 1973. After the arrest of the five men who had arrived to hunt the creature, residents of Enfield expressed fears that press coverage would lead to further "monster hunters", who might inadvertently shoot citizens or livestock.

It was suggested that the creature may have been a kangaroo escaped from a nearby zoo, which would explain the "three legs" description as the tails of kangaroos look like a third leg. McDaniel was adamant that the creature "wasn't no kangaroo", having owned such a creature as a pet while on military service in Australia, and noting that kangaroos have narrow faces and tracks that leave claw marks. Following media coverage of the creature, an Ohio man contacted a local newspaper stating that the creature may have been his pet kangaroo, Macey, which had been lost or stolen a year previously.

A few days after the event, United Press International quoted an anthropology student who suggested that the creature may have been a wild ape, noting that such animals had been reported throughout the Mississippi area since 1941.

== University study ==
In 1978 researchers at Western Illinois University headed by David L. Miller investigated and analyzed the incident, publishing it as a case study in social contagion. The researchers found there were no more than three firsthand reports that had subsequently been exaggerated by news stories and local gossip into an "epidemic." According to the study:

In this area of Southern Illinois, it is not unreasonable to assume Mr. M or the radio news team had actually seen an animal. People we interviewed framed the recent events in these terms. Their accounts admitted the possibility that large dogs, calves, bears, deer, and wildcats had been sighted. Some frames suggested that an exotic pet, such as an ape or a kangaroo, was the catalyst for the monster reports. Finally, some people tactfully suggested that Mr. M. had a notoriously overactive imagination and had probably been shooting at shadows. In any event, we interviewed only one person who agreed with Mr. M's claim that he had indeed seen "a monster from outer space."
