= Kelly, Kentucky =

Unincorporated community in Kentucky, United States

Community of Kelly
- Community
- Location of Kelly, Kentucky
- Coordinates: 36°58′14″N 87°28′37″W
- Country: United States
- State: Kentucky
- County: Christian
- Elevation: 797 ft (243 m)
- Time zone: UTC-5 (Eastern (CST))
  - Summer (DST): UTC-4 (CST)
- ZIP code: 40067
- Area codes: 270 & 364
- Website: www.kellyky.com

Kelly is an unincorporated community in Christian County, Kentucky, in the United States. Kelly is on U.S. Route 41, at 36°58′14″N 87°28′37″W (38.218373, -85.353058).

== History ==
The community is known for being the location of the 1955 Kelly-Hopkinsville incident, a famous close encounter where unidentified lights and unknown humanoids were allegedly witnessed at a rural farmhouse. In honor of this event, the community hosts the Kelly "Little Green Men" Days festival each year, where visitors can buy "intergalactic souvenirs". The 2017 anniversary and festival coincided with a total solar eclipse.

== See also ==
- Kelly-Hopkinsville encounter
- Close Encounter
- UFO sightings in the United States
