= Zanfretta UFO Incident =

Alleged 1978 alien abduction in Italy

Zanfretta UFO Abduction
- Location of Italy
- Date: 6 December 1978 – 1981
- Location: 'Casa nostra', Marzano di Torriglia, Genoa; 44.505601°N 9.139652°E
- Participants: Pier Fortunato Zanfretta

The Zanfretta UFO incident was an alleged alien encounter that occurred on 6 December 1978 near the town of Torriglia, in the province of Genoa, northern Italy, and which involved security guard Pier Fortunato Zanfretta, who claimed to have had a close encounter with an extraterrestrial being during a night patrol and to have also seen a triangular spaceship that blinded him with an extremely intense light before disappearing into the sky.

Following the media frenzy caused by the news spreading across the country, Zanfretta agreed to undergo a regressive hypnosis session, through which he reportedly remembered being abducted and taken aboard the extraterrestrial craft. However, the use of hypnosis was heavily criticized by skeptics, as the scientific community has widely deemed the practice invalidating as it tends to induce false memories in patients.

Zanfretta later claimed to have been abducted by the extraterrestrial beings 11 times between 1978 and 1981. He also claimed to have received an alien artifact, but was never able to prove its existence. His story is the most documented alleged alien abduction case in Italian ufology.

== Initial encounter ==
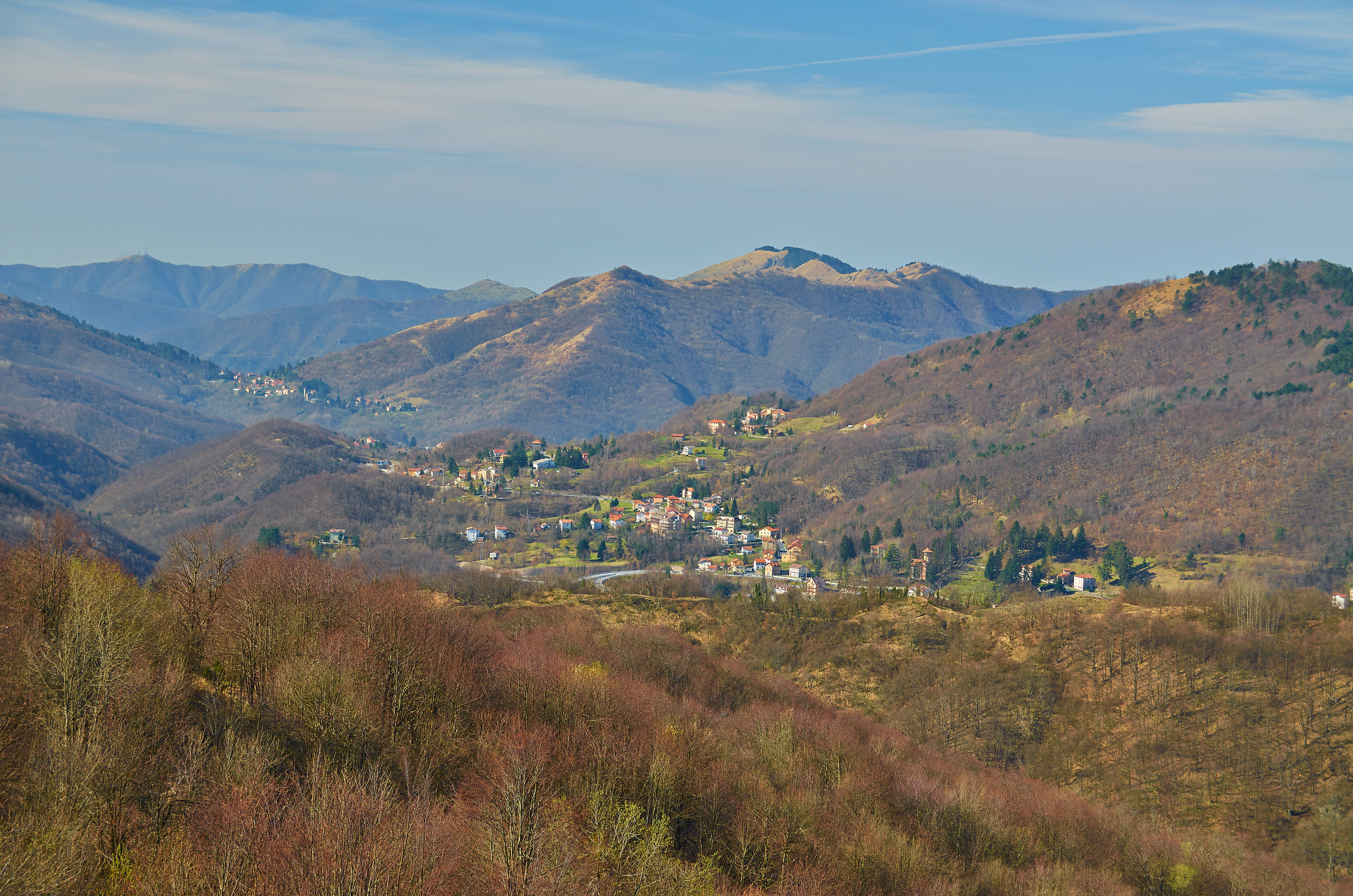
Torriglia, in the province of Genoa

On the evening of 6 December 1978, night watchman Pier Fortunato Zanfretta – 26 years old at the time – was carrying out his usual patrol in the area of Marzano, a hamlet in the municipality of Torriglia, on the Genoese mountains. According to his version, around 11:30 p.m., he noticed four unusual lights in the garden of a mansion known as "Casa Nostra", which belonged to a local dentist. The gate and the front door were wide open. Convinced that a group of thieves were attempting to break in, he decided to intervene to prevent the theft.

Once inside through the backyard, he saw a red, oval object with a diameter of over 10 metres (33 ft). At this point, he radioed his supervisor, who recalled him screaming. When Zanfretta turned around, he reported running into beings who were 3 metres (9.8 ft) tall, with mottled skin as though they were fat or wearing a rumpled suit. The creatures had yellow triangular eyes and clawed feet.

When the supervisor asked if he was being attacked by men, Zanfretta was said to have responded "No, non sono uomini, non sono uomini..." (No, they are not men), at which point communication was lost.

Zanfretta was later found unconscious and in "a state of shock" by his colleagues.

=== Initial investigations and media interest ===
The event was reported to the Carabinieri – one of the Italian police forces – at around 12 pm the following day by the owner of the security company where Zanfretta worked.

An investigation followed and Brigadier Antonio Nucchi collected 52 accounts of strange events between the municipalities of Torriglia and Propata. Many people reported seeing a large bright object in the sky on the night of the Zanfretta incident; however, there is no evidence that those testimonies were reliable. In the garden of the mansion, the Carabinieri also certified that there was a semicircular imprint approximately 2 metres (6.6 ft) in diameter and 3 metres (9.8 ft) in length where the grass was flattened.

Meanwhile, journalists became interested in the story. Within days, Zanfretta's incident became a case of national interest, especially after he was invited to appear on the television variety show Portobello to share his version of the events.

Journalist Rino Di Stefano – who first took an interest in the case and later published a book about it in several editions – proposed subjecting Zanfretta to a regressive hypnosis session to better remember what he had experienced on the night of 6 December. The session was conducted on 23 December 1978 by Mauro Moretti, a psychotherapist and medical hypnotist, in the presence of journalists and ufologists. While under hypnosis, Zanfretta claimed that the alien beings had abducted him, taken him to a brightly lit room in their spaceship, and subjected him to painful experiments. He also added to the description of the aliens, saying:

"They are green, with triangular yellow eyes, with big thorns, they have green flesh and their skin is full of wrinkles as if they were old. Their mouths look like they’re made of iron, they have red veins on their heads, pointed ears and arms with fingernails… with round things… They come from the third galaxy."

— Rino Di Stefano, The Zanfretta Case: Chronicle of an Incredible True Story (2014)

== Other encounters ==
On the night of 27 December 1978, Zanfretta disappeared again after a frantic radio communication in which he announced that his car had stopped. The search for him was hampered by the fog and rain that weighed on the area that night. He was found just over an hour later near a mountain road, not too far from the Fiat 127 he had been driving, in a state of deep shock. The policemen who rescued him testified that his clothes were dry and his body was particularly warm despite the rain and low temperatures. Also, what appeared to be large footprints were noticed near the site of the discovery.

Zanfretta explained that he had been abducted again by the same aliens and that they wanted to take him away permanently. Because of his statements, he was interviewed by a neurologist who, on 31 January 1979, issued a certificate declaring that he had not detected any alterations in his thinking or psychosensory disturbances, and that no observation period or therapeutic advice was necessary.

Following the second incident, the security company Zanfretta worked for decided to relocate him to another area of the province and replace his vehicle with a Vespa scooter. On 30 July 1979, the man disappeared for a third time and was found about 2 km (1.2 mi) away from his motorcycle, racing disoriented in the darkness. A fourth similar incident occurred months later, on 2 December 1979.

In the early 1980s, due to the numerous strange events that continued to involve Zanfretta, the Genoa police commissioner revoked his gun license, which led to him losing his job as a guard.

== Investigations and explanations ==
Skeptical researchers harshly criticized the approach to the case by ufologists and sensationalist newspapers, and pointed out that the use of regressive hypnosis to reconstruct the event – in addition to the wide dismissal of its validity by the scientific community – had been performed without any precautions for the subject, which creates the possibility of inducing suggestions and false memories. Among the most critical aspects of the procedure, they reported the fact that the questions to be asked of the patient were discussed while he was already hypnotized. The administration of Penthothal was also questioned.

Although most skeptical journalists had no doubt that Zanfretta was in good faith and had no mental disorders, they concluded that the hypnosis sessions had invalidated his process of reconstructing the events. It was noted that the alien's race name, Dargos, strongly resembled that of Hydargos, the antagonist of Grendizer, a very popular show in Italy in 1978. Furthermore, the description of the aliens recalls one of the monsters that appeared in Zagor, a famous Italian comic book series. Hypnotist Mauro Moretti responded to these claims by stating that the subject had no familiarity with science fiction; however, this assertion was disputed because there were a large number of sci-fi products appearing on television and in various types of advertising in the late 1970s, and it was therefore unlikely that Zanfretta had no visual references in this regard.

The skeptics also demonstrated that the supposed evidence for the extraterrestrial hypothesis had logical or natural explanations, which were omitted or manipulated by those who wanted to profit from the story, such as some tabloid newspapers and ufology magazines. The strange circle of crushed grass found after the first alleged encounter corresponded to the point where the owners of the mansion used to keep their horse tied up during daylight hours, and the temperature of Zanfretta's clothes was compatible with what they would have had if he had remained in the car for a while and not outside. As for the second encounter, what were described as giant footprints were actually compatible with simple puddles. Lastly, the alleged sightings of strange objects in the sky by other people at the time of the events have never been authoritatively verified.

CUN, the Italian National UFO Center, declared on several occasions through its representatives that it did not consider Zanfretta's story to be reliable.

== In popular culture ==
The case was the subject of the play "Loro– Storia vera del più famoso rapimento alieno in Italia" ("They— The True Story of the Most Famous Alien Abduction in Italy").
