= Meade Layne =

American academic and early researcher of ufology and parapsychology

- Meade Layne in 1930
- Born: September 8, 1882; Viroqua, Wisconsin, U.S.
- Died: May 12, 1961 (aged 78); San Diego, California, U.S.
- Other name: Newton Meade Layne

Academic work
- Discipline: English; Ufology; Parapsychology
- Sub-discipline: Interdimensional hypothesis "Etheria"
- Institutions: University of Southern California; Illinois Wesleyan University; Florida Southern College

Meade Layne (September 8, 1882 – May 12, 1961) was an American academic and early researcher of ufology and parapsychology, best known for proposing an early version of the interdimensional hypothesis to explain flying saucer sightings.

== Early life ==
Layne was born in Viroqua, Wisconsin and raised in San Diego. Layne sold office supplies, worked as a real estate agent, managed an oil and gas company, and wrote poetry. He claimed to have earned a PhD in English literature. By 1934, Layne's poems had inspired both "Romanza" and "Enchanted Moon", two piano pieces by Barbara Sterling.

== Career ==
Layne was the founder and first director of Borderland Sciences Research Associates. Prior to his public work studying ufos, Layne was professor at the University of Southern California, and English department head at Illinois Wesleyan University and Florida Southern College.

In February 1945, Meade began publishing a mimeographed newsletter titled "Round Robin". On October 14, 1946, nearly a year before Kenneth Arnold's sighting that coined the term "flying saucers", Layne achieved national notoriety when the wire service carried a story of Layne's claims of a medium who was in telepathic communication with people in a space ship.

The following year, during the 1947 flying disc craze, media again quoted Layne on his "ether ship" theories. Layne speculated that, rather than representing advanced military or extraterrestrial technology, flying saucers were piloted by beings from a parallel dimension, which he called Etheria, and their "ether ships" were usually invisible but could be seen when their atomic motion became slow enough. He further claimed that Etherians could become stranded on the terrestrial plane when their ether ships malfunctioned, and that various governments were aware of these incidents and had investigated them.

In 1948, Layne was featured in media for his proposal to use "underwater radar" to search for the mythical lost continent of Atlantis. In 1950, press covered Layne's publication of "Flying Discs: The Ether Ship Mystery and its Solution". Layne also publicized earlier stories of a crashed saucer with 30 inch-tall bodies found inside. In 1951, Layne promoted Paxson Hayes's claims about ancient giants in Mexico.

Furthermore, Layne argued that Etherians and their ether ships inspired much of earth's mythology and religion, but that they were truly mortal beings despite having a high level of technological and spiritual advancement. He claimed that their motive in coming to the terrestrial plane of existence was to reveal their accumulated wisdom to humanity. These revelations would be relayed through individuals with sufficiently developed psychic abilities, allowing them to contact the Etherians and communicate with them directly; in particular, he relied extensively on the mediumship of Mark Probert as confirmation of his theories. .

== Death ==
Layne died in San Diego in 1961.

== Works ==
- Layne, Meade, The Ether Ship Mystery And Its Solution, San Diego, Calif., 1950.
- Layne, Meade, The Coming of The Guardians, San Diego, Calif., 1954.

== See also ==
- Jacques Vallée

== Sources ==
- Reece, Gregory L. (2007). UFO Religion: Inside Flying Saucer Cults and Culture. I. B. Tauris. ISBN 978-1845114510.
