= Kelly–Hopkinsville encounter =

Claimed UFO incident

- Date: August 21, 1955 (71 years ago)
- Location: Christian County, Kentucky, U.S.
- Also known as: Hopkinsville Goblins Case; Kelly Green Men Case
- Type: Close encounter (claimed)

The Kelly–Hopkinsville encounter (also known as the Hopkinsville Goblins Case or Kelly Green Men Case) is a claimed close encounter with extraterrestrial beings that occurred near the communities of Kelly and Hopkinsville in Christian County, Kentucky, United States during the night and early morning of August 21–22, 1955. Ufologists regard it as one of the most significant and well-documented cases in the history of UFO incidents, while skeptics maintain there was no actual physical evidence that the encounter ever took place and the reports were due to "the effects of excitement" and misidentification of natural phenomena such as meteors and owls. The alleged encounter was officially classified as a hoax in the Project Blue Book files by the United States Air Force.

Psychologists have used the alleged incident as an academic example of pseudoscience to help students distinguish truth from fiction.

== Claims ==
Location of Hopkinsville in the state of Kentucky

On the evening of August 21, 1955, five adults and seven children arrived at the Hopkinsville police station claiming that small alien creatures from a spaceship had been attacking their farmhouse and that they had been holding them off with gunfire "for nearly four hours". Two of the adults, Elmer Sutton and Billy Ray Taylor, claimed they had been shooting at a few short, dark figures who repeatedly popped up at the doorway or peered into windows. The Kentucky New Era, the first paper to report the incident, increased the number of creatures to "12 to 15," and this continues to be the number most often reported.

Concerned about a possible gun battle between local citizens, four city police officers, five state troopers, three deputy sheriffs, and four military police officers from the nearby United States Army Fort Campbell drove to the Sutton farmhouse located near the town of Kelly in Christian County. Their search yielded no evidence apart from broken windows and holes in screens, possibly the result of gunfire.

Residents of the farmhouse included Glennie Lankford; her minor children, Lonnie, Charlton, and Mary; two grown sons from a previous marriage, Elmer "Lucky" Sutton and John Charley "J.C." Sutton; Lucky and J.C.'s respective wives, Vera and Alene; Alene's brother, O. P. Baker; Billy Ray Taylor; and Billy Ray's wife, June. Both the Taylors, Lucky, and Vera were reportedly itinerant carnival workers who were visiting the farmhouse. When officers returned the next day, they found the house empty. Neighbors informed them that the families had "packed up and left" after claiming "the creatures had returned about 3:30 in the morning."

== Press coverage ==
The family's claims received widespread coverage in local and national press. Early articles did not refer to ”little green men”; the color was later added to some newspaper stories. Estimates of the size of the alleged creatures varied from 2 to 4 feet (61 to 122 cm), and details such as "large pointed ears, clawlike hands, eyes that glowed yellow and spindly legs" later appeared in various media.

== Explanations ==
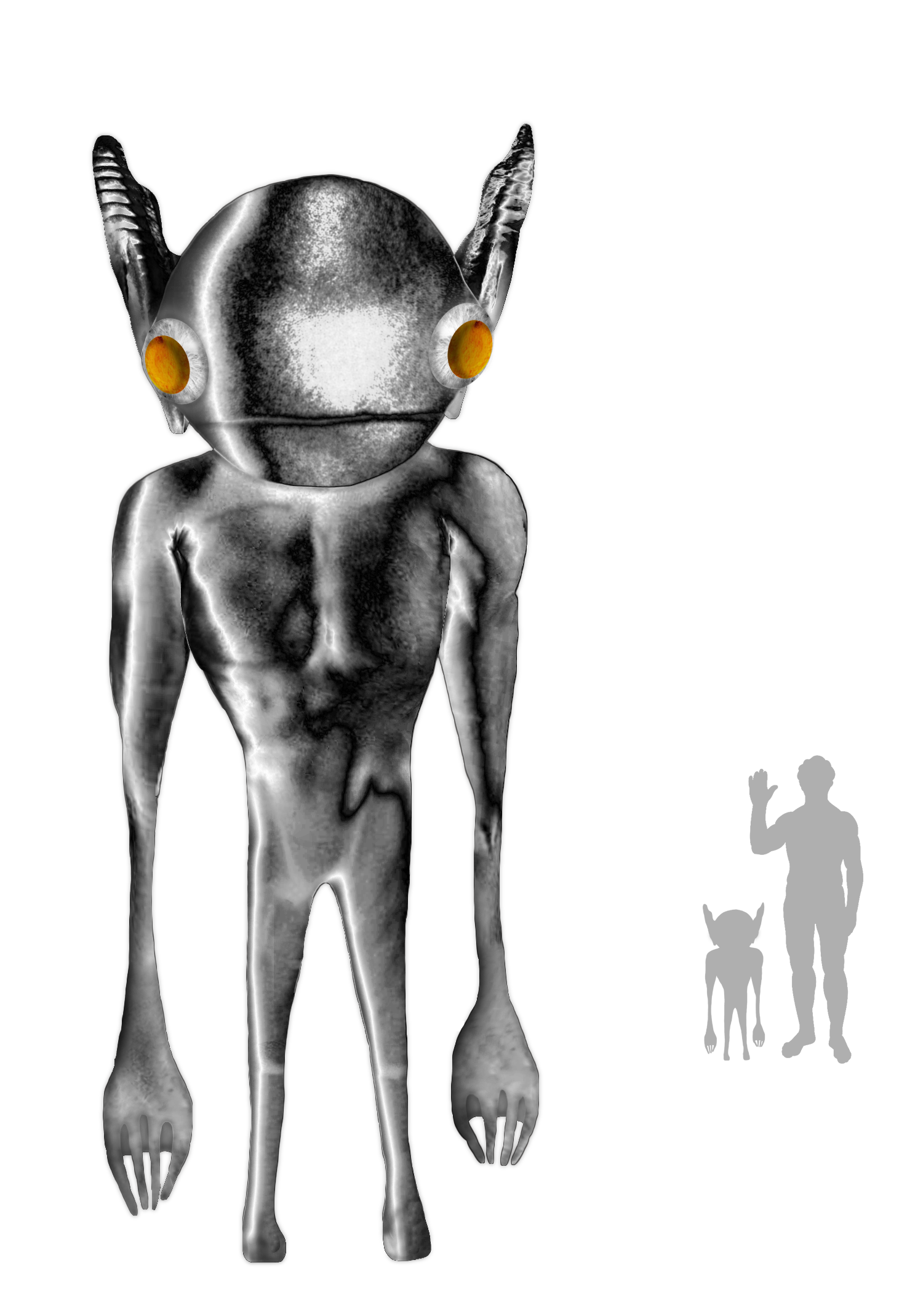
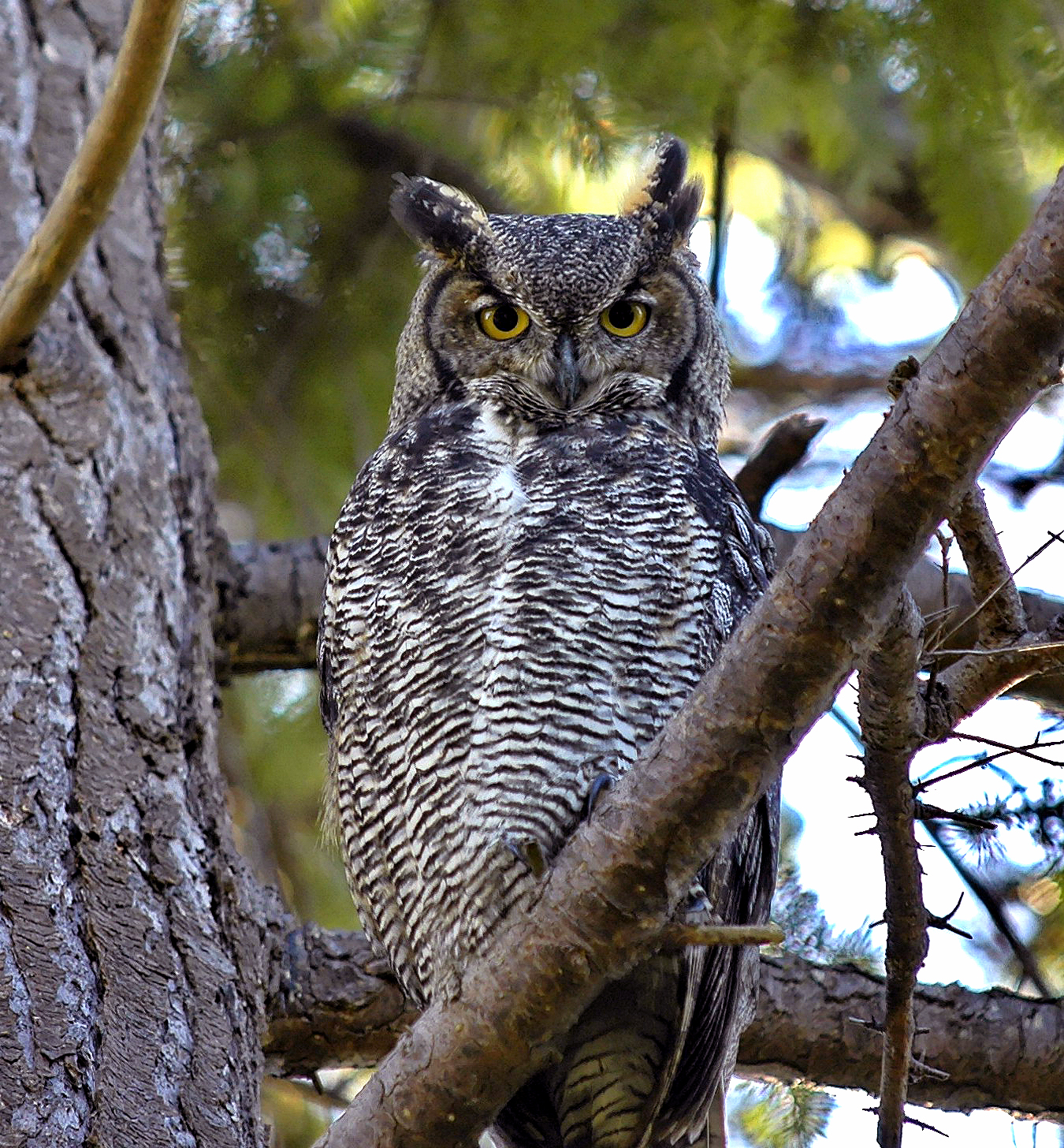
Left: a popular image of a "Hopkinsville Goblin". Right: a great horned owl, a hypothesized explanation.

Psychologists Rodney Schmaltz and Scott Lilienfeld cite the alleged incident as an example of pseudoscience and an "extraordinary claim" to help students develop critical thinking skills. Although contemporary newspaper stories reported that "all officials appeared to agree that there was no drinking involved", Schmaltz and Lilienfeld suggest that intoxication may have played a part in the sighting.

Committee for Skeptical Inquiry member and skeptic Joe Nickell notes that the family could have misidentified "eagle owls" or great horned owls, which are nocturnal, fly silently, have yellow eyes, and aggressively defend their nests. According to Nickell, meteor sightings also occurred at the time that could explain Billy Ray Taylor's claim that he saw "a bright light streak across the sky and disappear beyond a tree line some distance from the house".

Author Brian Dunning noted that the height of the owls would be comparable to at least the lower end of the reported range of around 2 feet (24 in; 61 cm): "There are simply too many similarities between the creatures reported by the families and an aggressive pair of the local Great Horned Owls, which do stand about two-thirds of a meter tall."

== Ufologists ==
French ufologist Renaud Leclet argued in a publication that the best explanation of the case is that the residents had simply seen great horned owls.

Ufologist Jerome Clark writes that the supposed creatures "floated" through the trees and the sound of bullets striking them "resembled bullets striking a metal bucket". Clark describes "an odd luminous patch along a fence where one of the beings had been shot, and, in the woods beyond, a green light whose source could not be determined"; however, this description was consistent with foxfire, a bioluminescent fungus on decaying wood.

Clark also wrote that investigations by "police, Air Force officers from nearby Fort Campbell, and civilian ufologists found no evidence of a hoax"; however, Brian Dunning reported: "The claim that Air Force investigators showed up the next day at Mrs. Lankford's house has been published a number of times by later authors, but I could find no corroborating evidence of this." Dunning also observed: "The four military police who accompanied the police officers on the night of the event were from an Army base, not an Air Force base."

Some ufologists compared the alleged creatures to gremlins; consequently, the alleged Kelly–Hopkinsville creatures have since often been referred to as the "Hopkinsville Goblins" in popular culture. Ufologist Allan Hendry wrote: "This case is distinguished by its duration and also by the number of witnesses involved." Project Blue Book listed the case as a hoax with no further comment.

== In popular culture ==
In the late 1970s, Steven Spielberg used the event as the basis for Night Skies, an unproduced science fiction horror film.

The 1986 comedy-horror film Critters is loosely based on the event.

The design of Generation 3 Pokémon Sableye is inspired by the description of the Hopkinsville Goblins.

In the Pathfinder Roleplaying Game, the "hobkins", a type of gremlin from the Bestiary 5 book, is based upon the goblins described in the event.

The event was the basis for the Annoyance Theater's musical It Came From Kentucky in Chicago.

A February 2020 episode of the American television series Project Blue Book focused on the event.

The Kelly community celebrates the event annually with the Little Green Men Days Festival.

== See also ==
- List of UFO sightings
- Goblin
