= Frank Scully =

American journalist

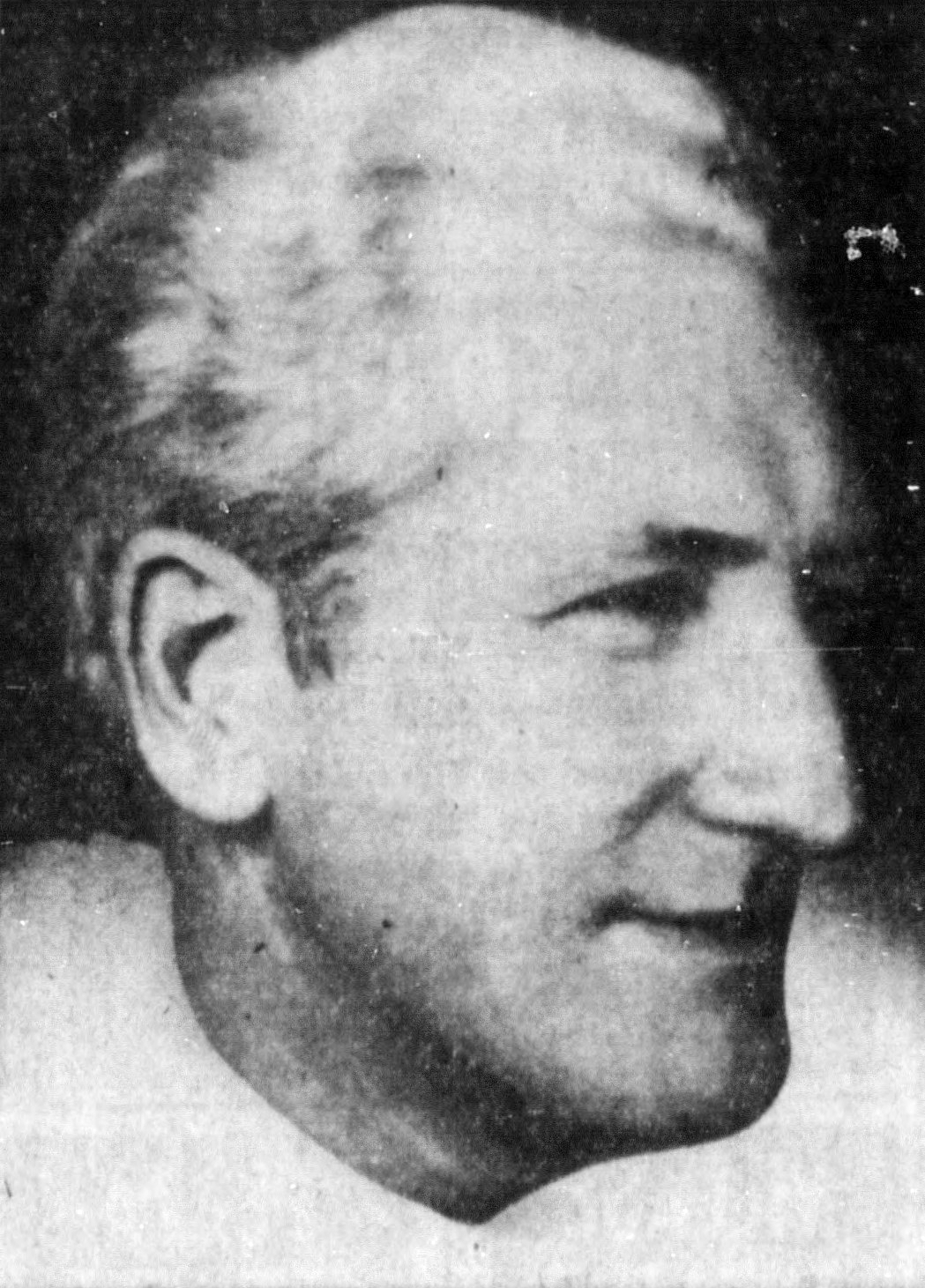
- Scully c. 1957
- Born: Francis Joseph Xavier Scully; April 28, 1892; New York City, U.S.
- Died: June 23, 1964 (aged 72); Palm Springs, California, U.S.
- Resting place: Desert Memorial Park, Cathedral City, California
- Occupations: Journalist, author, ufologist
- Employer(s): The Sun, Variety
- Political party: Democratic
- Spouse: Alice Scully (1909–1996; his death) (married 1930)
- Awards: Knight of the Pontifical Order of St. Gregory the Great in 1956

Francis Joseph Xavier Scully; (April 28, 1892 – June 23, 1964) was an American journalist, author, humorist, and a regular columnist for the entertainment trade magazine Variety.

== Career ==
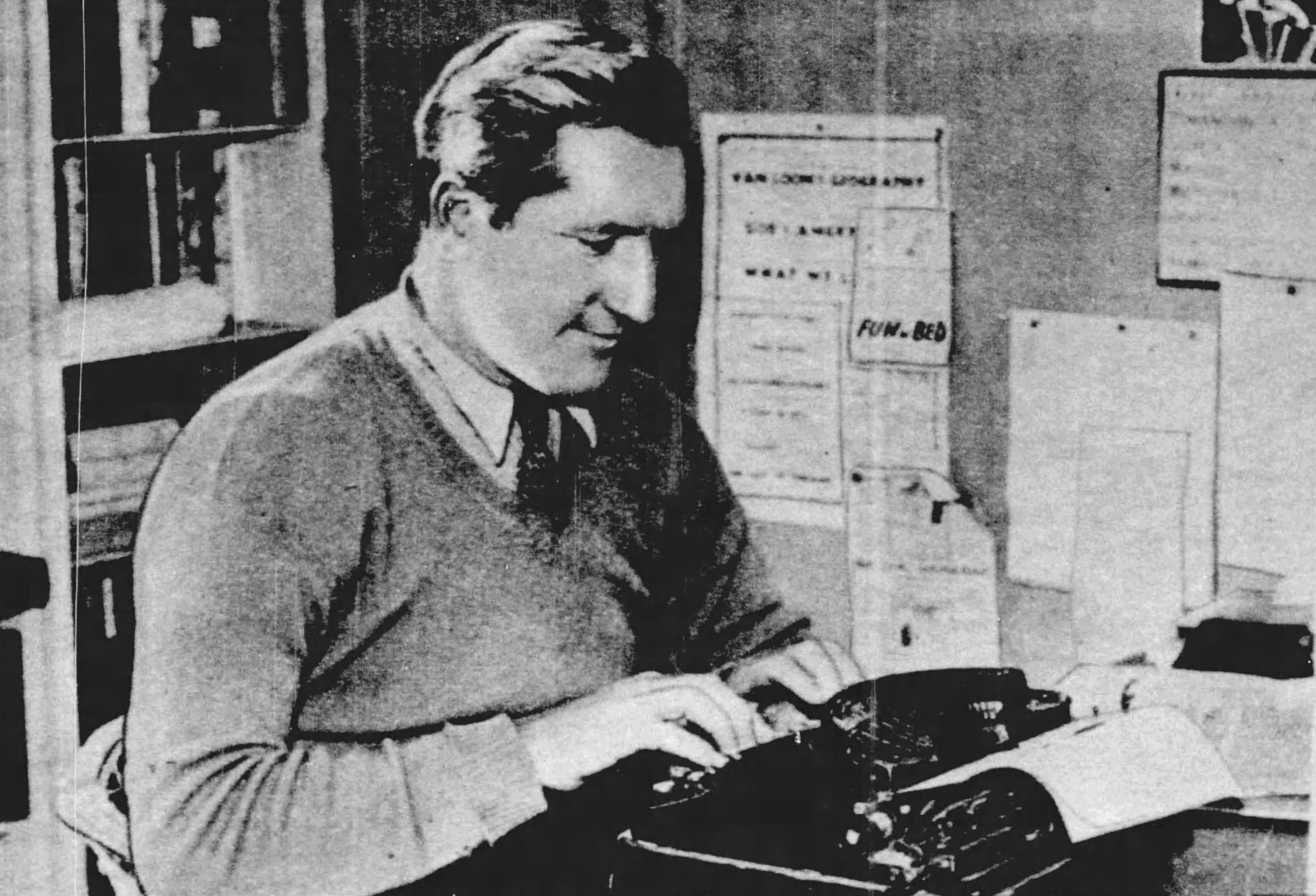
Scully in 1937

Scully studied journalism at Columbia University, was on the reporting staff at The New York Sun and was a contributor to Variety. His books include Rogues' Gallery and Fun In Bed: The Convalescent's Handbook. Scully received screenwriting credit for the American version of the film Une fée... pas comme les autres (The Secret of Magic Island).

Shortly after Scully moved to Burbank, California with his family in 1934, fellow journalist and author Upton Sinclair won the Democratic primary for the upcoming gubernatorial election. A supporter of Sinclair's End Poverty in California plan, Scully founded the Author's League for Sinclair, which attracted the likes of Gene Fowler and Dorothy Thompson.

In January 1939, Scully was appointed administrative assistant and secretary of the California Department of Institutions by director Aaron Rosanoff. Just nine months later, Scully was fired and replaced with Rosanoff's daughter Marjorie. A year later, Scully testified against Rosanoff and detailed abusive conditions at the Whittier State School for Boys. He further alleged that his lack of involvement in the abuse was the reason why he was targeted in an indictment for misappropriating funds. He was later acquitted of all charges.

During the 1940 Democratic Party presidential primaries, Scully joined a left-wing slate pledged to lieutenant governor Ellis E. Patterson for president. They opposed incumbent Franklin D. Roosevelt on the grounds he was focusing too much on foreign affairs and not enough on domestic unemployment. The Patterson slate lost to Roosevelt's by a margin of fifteen to one.

=== Aztec UFO hoax ===
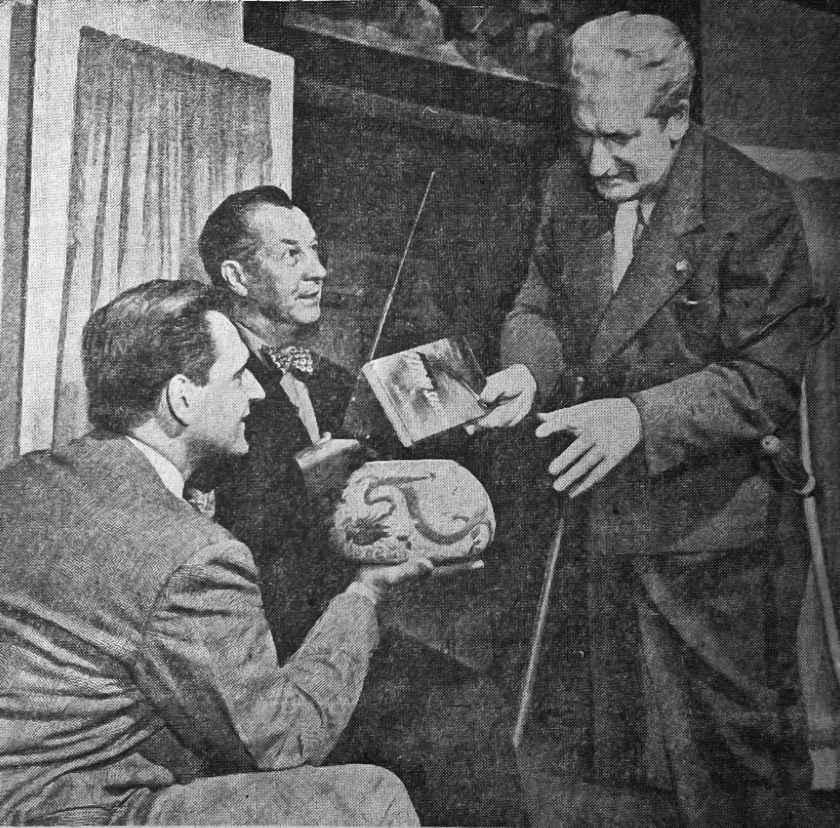
Author Frank Scully (right), confidence man Silas Newton (center), and KMYR radio salesman George Koehler (left) discuss Newton's claims of magnetism-powered flying saucers.

Scully publicized the Aztec, New Mexico UFO hoax when, in 1949, he wrote two columns in Variety claiming that dead extraterrestrial beings were recovered from a flying saucer crash.

Scully's 1950 book Behind the Flying Saucers expanded on the themes of flying saucer crashes and dead extraterrestrials, with Scully describing one of his sources as having "more degrees than a thermometer". In that book, he promoted the pseudohistorical claims of Paxson Hayes that prehistoric giants inhabited the Americas.

In 1952 and 1956, True magazine published articles by the San Francisco Chronicle reporter John Philip Cahn that purported to expose Scully's sources as confidence tricksters who had hoaxed Scully. Scully's 1963 book, In Armour Bright, also included material about alleged flying saucer crashes and dead extraterrestrials.

== Vatican knighthood ==
Scully was inducted as a Knight of the Pontifical Order of St. Gregory the Great in 1956.

== Publications ==
=== Books ===
- Scully, Frank (1932). Fun in Bed: The Convalescent's Handbook. Preface by Logan Clendening. New York: Simon & Schuster. OCLC 2430955.
- —— (1934). More Fun in Bed: The Convalescent's Handbook. New York: Simon & Schuster. OCLC 2629757.
- —— (1936). Bedside Manna: The Third Fun in Bed Book. New York: Simon & Schuster. OCLC 328577.
- —— (1938). Just What the Doctor Ordered. Fun in Bed (Series Four). New York: Simon & Schuster. OCLC 3317354.
- —— (1943). Rogues' Gallery: Profiles of My Eminent Contemporaries. Hollywood: Murray & Gee, Inc. OCLC 1661190.
- —— (1950). Behind the Flying Saucers. New York: Henry Holt and Company. OCLC 1467735.
- —— (1951). Blessed Mother Goose: Favorite Nursery Rhymes Retold for Today's Children. Illustrated by Keye Luke. New York: Greenberg. OCLC 6248166.
- —— (1951). Blessed Mother Goose: Nursery Rhymes for Today's Children. Illustrated by Keye Luke. Hollywood: House-Warven. OCLC 27893933.
- —— (1951). The Best of Fun in Bed. New York: Simon & Schuster. OCLC 687125.
- —— (1955). Cross My Heart. New York: Greenberg. OCLC 2570206.
- —— (1962). This Gay Knight: An Autobiography of a Modern Chevalier. Introduction by Dale Francis (1st ed.). Philadelphia: Chilton Co., Book Division. OCLC 1376376.
- —— (1963). In Armour Bright: Cavalier Adventures of My Short Life Out of Bed. Introduction by Jack Paar (1st ed.). Philadelphia: Chilton Books. OCLC 1393335.

=== Contributions, introductions, forewords ===
- Tchirikova, Olga Wassilieff (1934). Scully, Frank (ed.). Sandrik, Child of Russia. Introduction by Grand Duke Alexander. New York: Dodd, Mead & Company. OCLC 1522799.
- Kirkus, Virginia (1935). Scully, Frank (ed.). Fun in Bed For Children: First Aid in Getting Well Cheerfully. New York: Simon & Schuster. OCLC 4054743.
- —— (1935). Scully, Frank (ed.). Junior Fun in Bed: Making a Holiday of Convalescence. New York: Simon & Schuster. OCLC 5859811.
- Scully, Frank (1940). "The Beaut from Montana". In Gingrich, Arnold (ed.). The Bedside Esquire. New York: Tudor Publishing Company. OCLC 706396.
- Sper, Norman (1942). Norman Sper's Football Almanac [Eastern section, 1942]. Introduction by Frank Scully. New York: Greenberg, Inc. OCLC 31249461.
- Francis, Dale (1960). Kneeling in the Bean Patch. Forewords by Frank Scully. New York: P.J. Kenedy & Sons. OCLC 3026310.
- Walker, Gerald, ed. (1963). My Most Memorable Christmas. A Pocket Book special, 10021. Anecdote contributed by Frank Scully. New York: Pocket Books. OCLC 4182787.

=== Feature films ===
- Scully, Frank (Writer (1964 U.S. version)) (1957). Une fée... pas comme les autres (in French). France/Italy: Cine del Duco, Del Duca Films.

=== Archives ===
- Scully, Frank. Frank Scully papers, 1927–1985. Laramie, Wyoming: American Heritage Center, University of Wyoming. OCLC 34073391. Archived from the original on June 27, 2018. "Donated by Alice Scully in 1988." Collection Number 09554 processed in 1995.

== See also ==
- Aztec, New Mexico UFO hoax
- Donald Keyhoe
- Frank Edwards
