= List of UFO-related hoaxes =

Many hoaxes related to the study of unidentified flying objects have been perpetrated.

== Airship hoaxes ==
- For April Fool's Day 1897, two practical jokers in Omaha, Nebraska set aloft a helium balloon with a burning wicker basket suspended beneath it.
- On April 17, 1897, The Dallas Morning News reported that the previous evening three boys hoaxed a mystery airship sighting by soaking a cotton ball in kerosene and tying it to the leg of a turkey vulture. When the bird was released, witnesses to its light shouted "Look, it's the airship!" The hoax was discovered when the bird landed on the roof of the local high school and the burning cotton ball set fire to the school. Although the hoax was discovered, the boys still considered this a success.
- An account by Alexander Hamilton of Leroy, Kansas supposedly occurred about April 19, 1897, and was published in the Yates Center Farmer’s Advocate of April 23. Hamilton, his son, and a tenant witnessed an airship hovering over his cattle pen. Upon closer examination, the witnesses realized that a red “cable” from the airship had lassoed a heifer, but had also become entangled in the pen's fence. After trying unsuccessfully to free the heifer, Hamilton cut loose a portion of the fence, then "stood in amazement to see the ship, cow and all rise slowly and sail off.
- Wallace Tillinghast gained notoriety during the 1909 airship sighting wave by claiming he had built an airship and flown it over a hundred times across the Northeastern United States.

== Crashed UFO hoaxes ==
In 1884, the Nebraska State Journal ran two hoax articles about a crashed UFO in Dundy County, Nebraska.

During the 1947 flying disc craze, the Twin Falls saucer hoax was revealed by FBI chief Guy Banister to be constructed by young pranksters, and while Fred Crisman hoaxed the Maury Island incident that was investigated by original "disc" witness Kenneth Arnold. The mid-1950s saw the Aztec crashed saucer hoax. In the 1980s, Roswell mortician Glenn Dennis spread tales of alien bodies, widely views as hoax.

=== Alien autopsy ===
Beginning in 1993, Ray Santilli was either the victim or perpetrator of a hoax involving film footage that purported to show an autopsy being conducted in 1947 upon an alien related to the Roswell UFO incident. Santilli auctioned off the rights to be first to broadcast the film, which were won by the American Fox Broadcasting Company and presented in the 1995 show Alien Autopsy: Fact or Fiction and later in other programs. The footage had a deep impact throughout the media, and networks all over the world broadcast pictures representing what appears to be a corpse lying on a bed. It was revealed to be a hoax. Project Mogul was presented as the official explanation of the case.

Santilli initially stated he bought the film from Jack Barnett, an American who claimed (though turned out not to be) the commander of the US army. Santilli gave cuttings of the film to experts. However, he didn't give them the photos they took. This is because the photos were in a much clearer quality than the footage, so people could easily see the latex dummies.

=== 1967 flying saucer hoax in England ===
In September 1967, six 'flying saucers' were placed between the Thames Estuary and the Bristol Channel in southern England. The pranksters were apprentices from the Royal Aircraft Establishment at Farnborough. The hoax was part of the college's Rag Week and intended to raise money for charity.

=== British Roswell ===
A small piece of metal with hieroglyphs was discovered in 1957 in Silpho Moor near Scarborough, North Yorkshire. Its diameter was a mere 16 inches. Dubbed the "miniature UFO" and "British Roswell", experts stated it was most likely a hoax.

== Sighting hoaxes ==
- The Maury Island incident (1947) (also had debris)
- The Morristown UFO hoax (2009)

== Photographic hoaxes ==
In the 1950, Adamski photographs were concluded to be hoaxes.

=== Photograph of "an alien" taken at Ilkley Moor (1987) ===
A photograph taken on Ilkley Moor in West Yorkshire on December 1, 1987, was alleged to be of an alien. The English newspaper the Daily Star claimed to expose it as a hoax in its edition of July 2, 1989: saying that the alien in the picture was in fact an insurance broker, unsuspecting he was being photographed, while he visited his clientele in the outskirts and cut through the hills. Belgian investigators analysing the case stated "mais comment imaginer que des enquêteurs expérimentés aient pu se laisser prendre à un aussi banal canular ou méprise" (But how can we imagine that experienced investigators could have been misled by such a casual hoax?).

== See also ==
- List of hoaxes
- Photograph of Petit-Rechain
