= Maury Island incident =

Alleged UFO incident in the United States

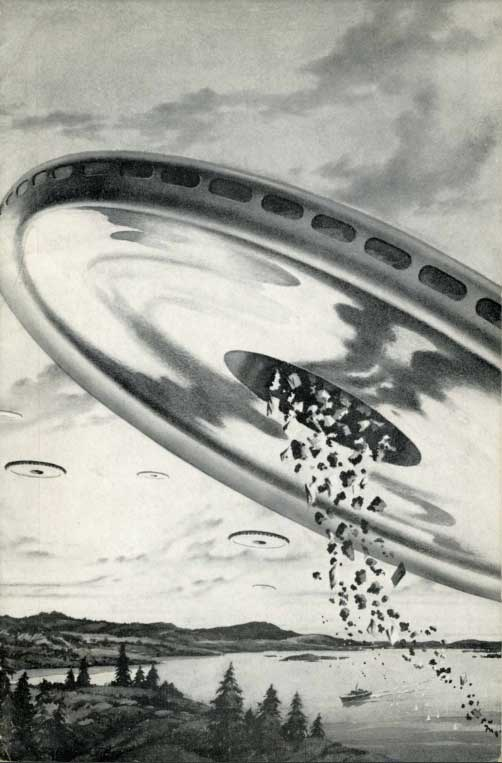
Artist impression of the Maury Island UFO incident

The Maury Island incident was an alleged UFO sighting over Maury Island, Washington, United States, on June 21, 1947. Harold Dahl claimed he had seen six unidentified flying objects above the island, and that one of them had expelled debris, which Fred Crisman claimed to have recovered samples of. Dahl later said he was told not to speak of what he saw by a man in a dark suit. On August 1, two Air Force officers tasked with investigating the claims died in a plane crash outside of Kelso, Washington.

The incident is widely regarded as a hoax, even by believers of flying saucers and UFOs. Project Blue Book chief Edward J. Ruppelt characterized the story as "the dirtiest hoax in the UFO history." It has served as the inspiration for an eponymous film, artwork, and local celebrations in Des Moines, Washington. In 2017, the Washington State Senate acknowledged the 70th anniversary of the date of the incident.

== Background ==
On June 24, 1947, private pilot Kenneth Arnold reported that he saw a string of nine shiny unidentified flying objects flying past Mount Rainier at speeds that Arnold estimated at a minimum of 1,200 miles an hour (1,932 km/h). Arnold's report garnered nationwide news coverage and his description of the objects also led to the press quickly coining the terms flying saucer and flying disc as popular descriptive terms for UFOs. Ten days later, Capt. E.J. Smith, his co-pilot, and a stewardess reported witnessing unidentified objects in the Pacific Northwest.

After his story was publicized, Arnold was contacted by Raymond A. Palmer, the editor of the science fiction magazine Amazing Stories, who is sometimes associated with the coining of the descriptive term, "UFO". Palmer relayed to Arnold the story of two harbor patrolmen in Tacoma who reportedly possessed fragments of a "flying saucer". Palmer requested that Arnold fly to Tacoma to investigate, and on July 28, Palmer wired $200 to Arnold to fund the investigation.

== Initial story ==
Location of Maury Island, Washington

On July 29, Arnold interviewed Harold Dahl, who reported:

On June 21, 1947 in the afternoon about two o'clock, I was patrolling the east bay of Maury Island [...] I, as captain, was steering my patrol boat close to the shore of a bay on Maury Island. On board were two crewmen, my fifteen-year-old son and his dog. As I looked up from the wheel on my boat I noticed six very large doughnut-shaped aircraft.

Dahl said that one of the objects "began spewing forth what seemed like thousands of newspapers from somewhere on the inside of its center. These newspapers, which turned out to be a white type of very lightweight metal, fluttered to earth". According to Dahl, a substance resembling lava rocks fell onto their boat, breaking a worker's arm and killing a dog.

Dahl said his superior officer, Fred Crisman, investigated the incident. Dahl also claimed he was later approached by a man in a dark suit and told not to talk about the event. Crisman, when interviewed, reported having recovered debris from Maury Island and having witnessed an unusual craft.

== Further investigation ==
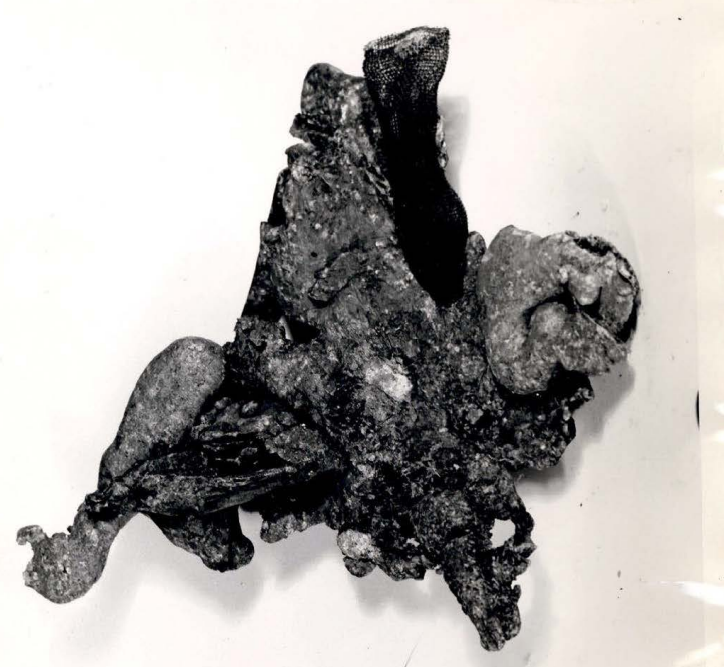
Rock from Maury Island incident

Arnold first recruited Captain E. J. Smith of United Airlines, who had reported witnessing a flying disc on July 4. Crisman showed "white metal" debris to Arnold and Smith, who interpreted it as mundane and inconsistent with Dahl's description. Arnold then decided to contact Lieutenant Frank Brown of Military Intelligence, Fourth Air Force, Hamilton Field, California. Brown arrived at Arnold's hotel in Tacoma along with Captain William L. Davidson.

Davidson and Brown conducted interviews, collected fragments, and prepared for the return flight to California out of McChord Field. In the early hours of August 1, the B-25 Mitchell the two officers were piloting crashed outside of Kelso, Washington, killing both men.

The FBI then began a formal investigation into Dahl and Crisman's claims, and quickly determined that they were false, noting that Dahl stated "if questioned by the authorities he was going to say it was a hoax because he did not want any further trouble over the matter." FBI files also detail a few alternate stories communicated by Crisman and Dahl to local newspapers and other media outlets, and conclude that the two men had contacted a variety of publications "in the hope of building up their story through publicity to a point where they could make a profitable deal with Fantasy Magazine of Chicago, Illinois."

== Legacy ==
Writing in 1956, Air Force officer Edward J. Ruppelt concluded, "The whole Maury Island Mystery was a hoax. The first, possibly the second-best, and the dirtiest hoax in the UFO history." Ruppelt observed:

The majority of the writers of saucer lore have played this sighting to the hilt, pointing out as their main premise the fact that the story must be true because the government never openly exposed or prosecuted either of the two hoaxers. This is a logical premise, but a false one. The reason for the thorough investigation of the Maury Island Hoax was that the government had thought seriously of prosecuting the men. At the last minute it was decided, after talking to the two men, that the hoax was a harmless joke that had mushroomed, and that the loss of two lives and a B-25 could not be directly blamed on the two men.

Despite the FBI promptly determining that the entire incident was a hoax, the tale has been retold numerous times. Gray Barker's 1956 book They Knew Too Much About Flying Saucers, which helped to popularize the concept of "men in black", cited the supposed event. The debunked Majestic 12 documents also referenced the story, claiming that the metal fragments were part of a nuclear reactor, and had been turned over to the CIA. In The UFO Investigator's Handbook, published in 1999, Craig Glenday gives the Maury Island incident and Arnold's sighting as examples of notable UFO encounters in the area of Mount Rainier, which he describes as a "UFO laborator[y]".

Artwork based on the Maury Island incident
- Maury Island UFO mural

The story continues to be noted locally as well. The 2014 short film The Maury Island Incident depicts the hoax and resulting events from Dahl's point of view. Art patron John White commissioned a mural by Nancy and Zach Pahl depicting the incident. The artwork is in Des Moines, Washington, which is East of Maury Island, on the opposite side of Puget Sound. In 2017, the Washington State Senate passed a resolution acknowledging the 70th anniversary of the alleged event. The city of Des Moines held their third annual "Men in Black Birthday Bash" on June 22, 2024.

== See also ==
- Kenneth Arnold
- Raymond A. Palmer
- List of reported UFO sightings
- List of UFO-related hoaxes
