= Albert Bender =

Albert Bender may refer to:

- Albert Bender (art patron) (1866–1941), patron of the arts in San Francisco and Dublin
- Albert K. Bender (1921–2016), American author and Ufologist
