= They Knew Too Much About Flying Saucers =

1956 book by Gray Barker

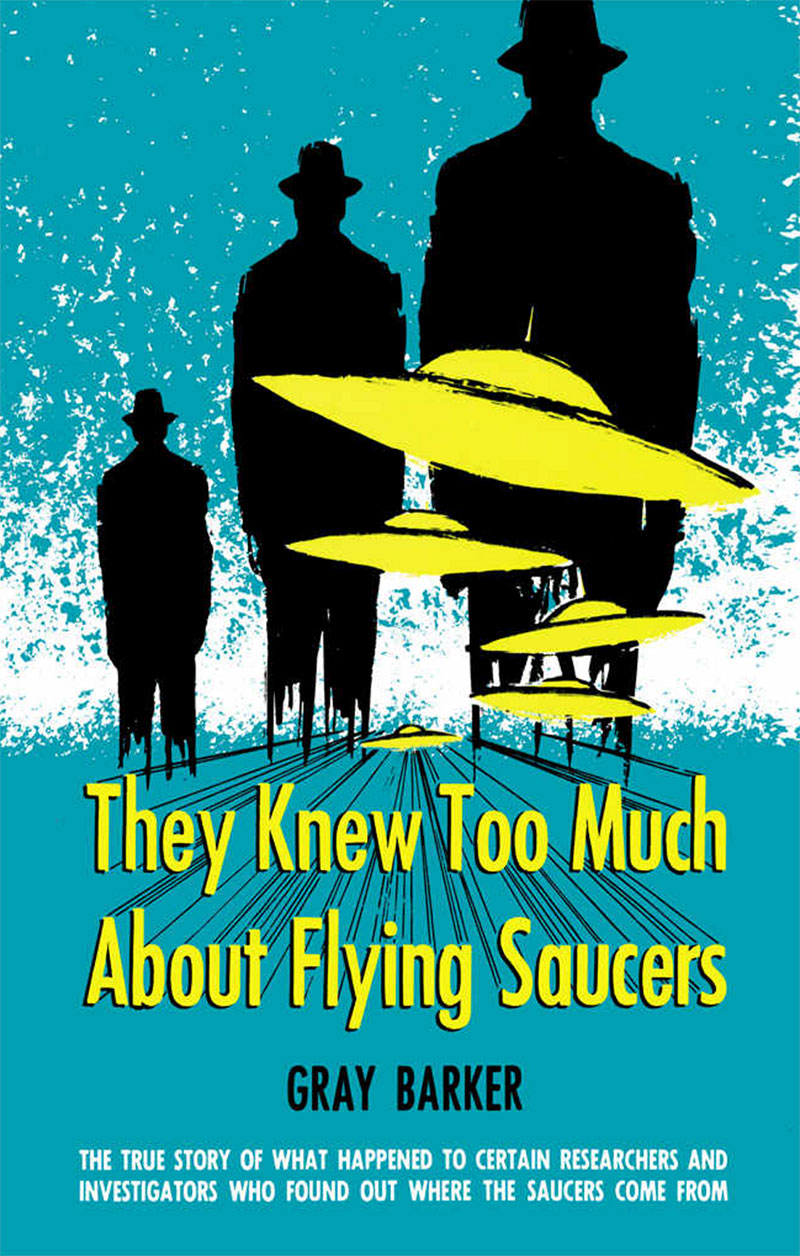
- First edition cover
- Author: Gray Barker
- Published: April 1956
- Publisher: University Books
- Media type: Hardcover
- Pages: 256
- ISBN: 9781515038986

They Knew Too Much About Flying Saucers is a 1956 book by paranormal author Gray Barker. The book is notable as the first to allege that "Men in Black" were covering up the existence of flying saucers.

== Background ==
In the summer of 1947, pilot Kenneth Arnold reported seeing flying objects in Washington State that would eventually be called flying saucers; Arnold's report triggered a wave of similar flying saucer sightings. By 1949, authors including Frank Scully and Donald Keyhoe were suggesting that the Air Force knew more about the saucers than they were publicly revealing.

In 1952, amateur UFO researcher Albert K. Bender founded the International Flying Saucer Bureau, the first major civilian UFO club. Gray Barker was a member. In October 1953, the group published the final issue of its newsletter, announcing the disbanding of the organization. The final issue reported that "The mystery of the flying saucers is no longer a mystery. The source is already known, but any information about this is being withheld by orders from a higher source."

In April 1956, University Books of New York City published They Knew Too Much About Flying Saucers, Barker's dramatized account of his involvement with the IFSB.

== Synopsis ==
The book famously claimed Bender and other UFO investigators had been "silenced" by strange men in black suits.

The work begins with Barker's initial interest in saucers during his 1952 investigation of the "Flatwoods Monster" and his subsequent saucer investigations in Brush Creek, California.

Barker describes his interest in the Shaver Mystery and the magazines of Raymond Palmer, which ultimately led him to correspond with Albert K. Bender and join Bender's "International Flying Saucer Bureau. According to the narrative, Bender receives a metal sample allegedly from a UFO, after which he is visited by three men, each wearing black, who confiscate back issues of the group's newsletter. Bender recalls that one of the men told Barker his research was pointless, claiming "In our government we have the smartest men in the country. They can't find a defense for it. How can you do anything about it?" Before they depart, one of the men warns Bender: "I suppose you know you are on your honor as an American. If I hear another word out of your office you're in trouble".

Barker recounts the 1947 tale of the Maury Island incident, where an alleged saucer witness claimed to have been warned not to discuss the incident by a man in a black suit. Barker speculates saucers may be linked to Antarctica or poltergeists. Barker lists others he believes have been "shushed", some in other countries.

== Influence ==
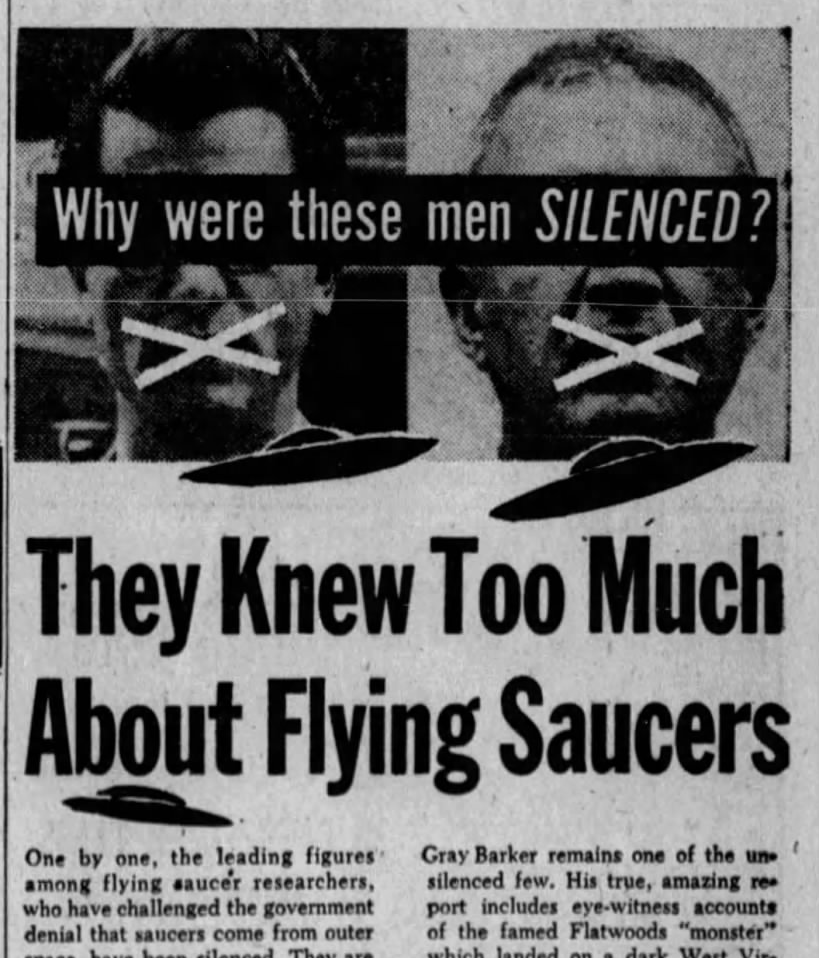
Advertisement formatted similar to a newspaper article

They Knew Too Much About Flying Saucers briefly made the best-seller lists in 1956.

Conspiracism scholar Michael Barkun writes that the book's 'Men in Black' "quickly became a staple of UFO folklore". Historian Aaron Gulyas, describing the book as "one of the few saucer books I can read over and over again", noted that "during the 1970s, 1980s, and 1990s, UFO conspiracy theorists would incorporate the MIB into their increasingly complex and paranoid visions." Folklore historian Curtis Peebles suggests that Barker's tale of the Men in Black may have been inspired by "contactee" George Adamski's story of an encounter with FBI agents.

In 1962, Bender himself authored an account of the events, Flying Saucers and the Three Men, which described the "Men in Black" as supernatural, floating about the floor and emitting bluish light. The Knew Too Much About Flying Saucers influenced 1990s popular culture, most notably The X-Files and Men in Black films. One author would liken The X-Files to a "spinoff of the gospel according to Barker".
