= Max Steiner =

Austrian-born American composer (1888–1971)

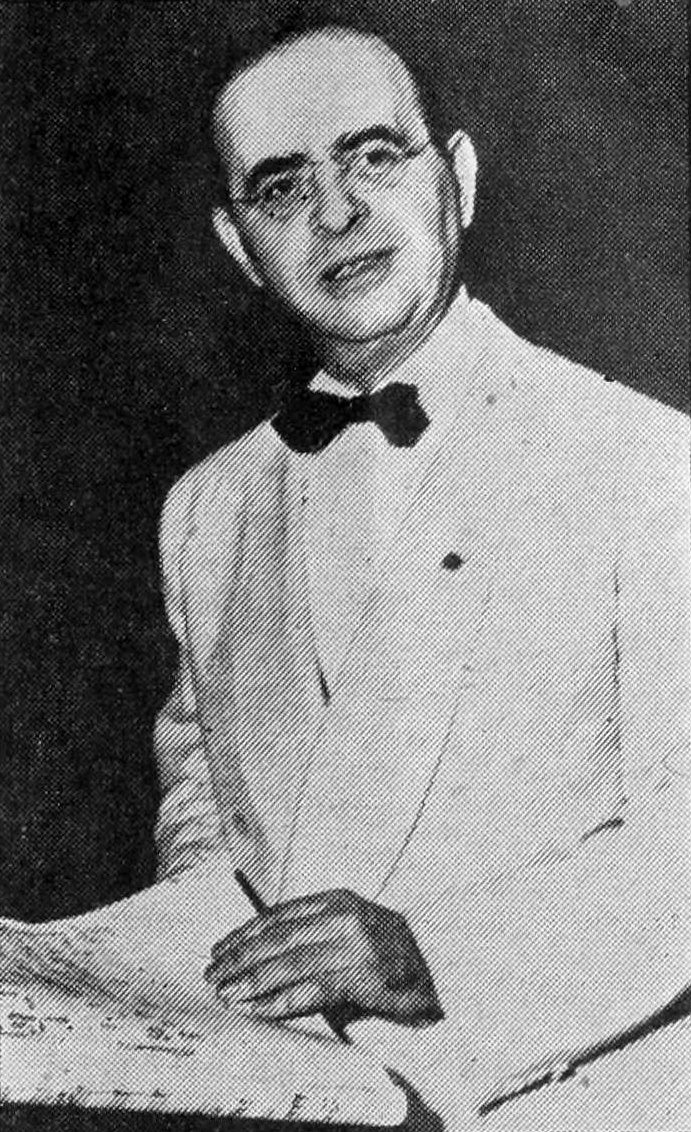
- Born: Maximilian Raoul Steiner; 10 May 1888; Vienna, Austria-Hungary (now Austria)
- Died: 28 December 1971 (aged 83); Los Angeles, California, U.S.
- Occupations: Composer, arranger, conductor
- Years active: 1907–1965
- Labels: Warner Bros. Pictures; RKO Radio Pictures
- Spouses: Beatrice Steiner (m. 1912–?); Aubrey Steiner (m. 1927; div. 1933) ; Louise Klos (m. 1936; div. 1946) ; Leonette "Lee" Steiner (m. 1947–1971)

Maximilian Raoul Steiner (Note: In his autobiography, Steiner states his full name as "Maximilian Raoul Walter Steiner". However, "Walter" is not on his birth register at the IKG in Vienna, nor on any other official document pertaining to his life. In addition, the reasons he mentioned this name are unknown.) (10 May 1888 – 28 December 1971) was an Austrian composer and conductor who emigrated to America and became one of Hollywood's greatest musical composers.

Steiner was a child prodigy who conducted his first operetta when he was twelve and became a full-time professional, proficient at composing, arranging, and conducting, by the time he was fifteen. Threatened with internment in England during World War I, he fled to Broadway; and in 1929 he moved to Hollywood, where he became one of the first composers to write music scores for films. He is often referred to as "the father of film music", as Steiner played a major part in creating the tradition of writing music for films, along with composers Dimitri Tiomkin, Erich Wolfgang Korngold, Franz Waxman, Alfred Newman, Bernard Herrmann, and Miklós Rózsa.

Steiner composed over 300 film scores with RKO Pictures and Warner Bros., and was nominated for 24 Academy Awards, winning three: The Informer (1935); Now, Voyager (1942); and Since You Went Away (1944). Besides his Oscar-winning scores, some of Steiner's popular works include King Kong (1933), Little Women (1933), Jezebel (1938), and Casablanca (1942), though he did not compose its love theme, "As Time Goes By". In addition, Steiner scored The Searchers (1956), A Summer Place (1959), and Gone with the Wind (1939), which ranked second on the AFI's list of best American film scores, and is the film score for which he is best known.

He was also the first recipient of the Golden Globe Award for Best Original Score, which he won for his score for Life with Father. Steiner was a frequent collaborator with some of the best known film directors in history, including Michael Curtiz, John Ford, and William Wyler, and scored many of the films with Errol Flynn, Bette Davis, Humphrey Bogart, and Fred Astaire. Many of his film scores are available as separate soundtrack recordings.

== Early life and education ==
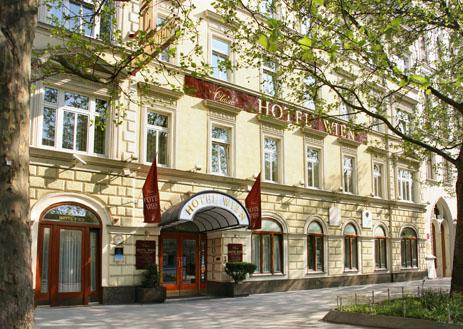
Max Steiner's birthplace in Vienna today, Praterstraße 72

Max Steiner was born on 10 May 1888, in Vienna, Austria-Hungary, as the only child in a wealthy business and theatrical family of Jewish heritage. He was named after his paternal grandfather, Maximilian Steiner (1839–1880), who was credited with first persuading Johann Strauss II to write for the theater, and was the influential manager of Vienna's historic Theater an der Wien. His parents were Marie Josefine/Mirjam (Hasiba) and Hungarian-Jewish Gábor Steiner (1858–1944, born in Temesvár, Kingdom of Hungary, Austrian Empire), a Viennese impresario, carnival exposition manager, and inventor, responsible for building the Wiener Riesenrad. His father encouraged Steiner's musical talent, and allowed him to conduct an American operetta at the age of twelve, The Belle of New York, which allowed Steiner to gain early recognition by the operetta's author, Gustave Kerker. Steiner's mother Marie was a dancer in stage productions put on by his grandfather when she was young, but later became involved in the restaurant business. Richard Strauss strongly influenced Steiner's future work. Steiner often credited his family for inspiring his early musical abilities. As early as six years old, Steiner was taking three or four piano lessons a week from Johannes Brahms but often became bored with the lessons. Because of this, he would practice improvising on his own, his father encouraging him to write his music down. Steiner cited his early improvisation as an influence of his taste in music, particularly his interest in the music of Claude Debussy which was "avant garde" for the time. In his youth, he began his composing career through his work on marches for regimental bands and hit songs for a show put on by his father.

Steiner's parents sent him to the Vienna University of Technology, but he expressed little interest in scholastic subjects. He enrolled in the Imperial Academy of Music in 1904, where, due to his precocious musical talents and private tutoring by Robert Fuchs, and Gustav Mahler, he completed a four-year course in only one year, winning himself a gold medal from the academy at the age of fifteen. He studied various instruments including violin, double bass, organ, and trumpet. His preferred and best instrument was the piano, but he acknowledged the importance of being familiar with what the other instruments could do. He also had courses in harmony, counterpoint, and composition. Along with Mahler and Fuchs, he cited his teachers as Felix Weingartner and Edmund Eysler.

== Career ==
=== Beginning music career (1907–1914) ===
The music of Edmund Eysler was an early influence in the pieces of Max Steiner; however, one of his first introductions to operettas was by Franz Lehár who worked for a time as a military bandmaster for Steiner's father's theatre. Steiner paid tribute to Lehár through an operetta modeled after Lehár's Die lustige Witwe which Steiner staged in 1907 in Vienna. Eysler was well known for his operettas though as critiqued by Richard Traubner, the libretti were poor, with a fairly simple style, the music often relying too heavily on the Viennese waltz style. As a result, when Steiner started writing pieces for the theater, he was interested in writing libretto as his teacher had, but had minimal success. However, many of his future film scores such as Dark Victory (1939), In This Our Life (1941), and Now, Voyager (1942) had frequent waltz melodies as influenced by Eysler. According to author of Max Steiner's "Now, Voyager" Kate Daubney, Steiner may also have been influenced by Felix Weingartner who conducted the Vienna Opera from 1908 to 1911. Although he took composition classes from Weingartner, as a young boy, Steiner always wanted to be a great conductor.

Between 1907 and 1914, Steiner traveled between Britain and Europe to work on theatrical productions. Steiner first entered the world of professional music when he was fifteen. He wrote and conducted the operetta The Beautiful Greek Girl, but his father refused to stage it saying it was not good enough. Steiner took the composition to competing impresario Carl Tuschl who offered to produce it. Much to Steiner's pleasure, it ran in the Orpheum Theatre for a year. This led to opportunities to conduct other shows in various cities around the world, including Moscow and Hamburg. Upon returning to Vienna, Steiner found his father in bankruptcy. Having difficulties finding work, he moved to London (in part to follow an English showgirl he had met in Vienna). In London, he was invited to conduct Lehar's The Merry Widow. He stayed in London for eight years conducting musicals at Daly's Theatre, the Adelphi, the Hippodrome, the London Pavilion, and the Blackpool Winter Gardens. Steiner married Beatrice Tilt on September 12, 1912. The exact date of their divorce is unknown.

In England, Steiner wrote and conducted theater productions and symphonies. But the beginning of World War I in 1914 led him to be interned as an enemy alien. Fortunately, he was befriended by the Duke of Westminster, who was a fan of his work, and was given exit papers to go to America, although his money was impounded. He arrived in New York City in December 1914, with only $32. Unable to find work, he resorted to menial jobs such as a copyist for Harms Music Publishing, which quickly led him to jobs orchestrating stage musicals.

=== Broadway music (1914–1929) ===
In New York, Max Steiner quickly acquired employment and worked for fifteen years as a musical director, arranger, orchestrator, and conductor of Broadway productions. These productions include operettas and musicals written by Victor Herbert, Jerome Kern, Vincent Youmans, and George Gershwin, among others. Steiner's credits include: George White's Scandals (1922) (director), Peaches (1923) (composer), and Lady, Be Good (1924) (conductor and orchestrator). At twenty-seven years old, Steiner became Fox Film's musical director in 1915. At the time, there was no specially written music for films and Steiner told studio founder William Fox his idea to write an original score for The Bondman (1916). Fox agreed and they put together a 110-piece orchestra to accompany the screenings. During his time working on Broadway, he married Audree van Lieu on 27 April 1927. They divorced on 14 December 1933. In 1927, Steiner orchestrated and conducted Harry Tierney's Rio Rita. Tierney himself later requested RKO Pictures in Hollywood hire Steiner to work in their music production departments. William LeBaron, RKO's head of production, traveled to New York to watch Steiner conduct and was impressed by Steiner and his musicians, who each played several instruments. Eventually, Steiner became a Hollywood asset. Steiner's final production on Broadway was Sons O' Guns in 1929.

=== Scoring for RKO (1929–1937) ===
By request of Harry Tierney, RKO hired Max Steiner as an orchestrator and his first film job consisted of composing music for the main and end titles and occasional "on screen" music. According to Steiner, the general opinion of filmmakers during the time was that film music was a "necessary evil", and would often slow down production and release of the film after it was filmed. Steiner's first job was for the film Dixiana; however, after a while, RKO decided to let him go, feeling they were not using him. His agent found him a job as a musical director on an operetta in Atlantic City. Before he left RKO, they offered him a month to month contract as the head of the music department with promise of more work in the future and he agreed. Because the few composers in Hollywood were unavailable, Steiner composed his first film score for Cimarron. The score was well received and was partially credited for the success of the film. He turned down several offers to teach film scoring technique in Moscow and Peking in order to stay in Hollywood. In 1932, Steiner was asked by David O. Selznick, the new producer at RKO, to add music to Symphony of Six Million. Steiner composed a short segment; Selznick liked it so much that he asked him to compose the theme and underscoring for the entire picture. Selznick was proud of the film, feeling it gave a realistic view of Jewish family life and tradition. "Music until then had not been used very much for underscoring". Steiner "pioneered the use of original composition as background scoring for films". The successful scoring in Symphony of Six Million was a turning point for Steiner's career and for the film industry. Steiner reflected that a large part of the success of Symphony of Six Million "was attributed to the extensive use of music" in the film.

The score for King Kong (1933) became Steiner's breakthrough and represented a paradigm shift in the scoring of fantasy and adventure films. The score was an integral part of the film, because it added realism to an unrealistic film plot. The studio's bosses were initially skeptical about the need for an original score; however, since they disliked the film's contrived special effects, they let Steiner try to improve the film with music. The studio suggested using old tracks in order to save on the cost of the film; however, King Kong producer Merian C. Cooper asked Steiner to score the film and said he would pay for the orchestra. Steiner took advantage of this offer and used an eighty-piece orchestra, explaining the film "was made for music". According to Steiner, "it was the kind of film that allowed you to do anything and everything, from weird chords and dissonances to pretty melodies." Steiner additionally scored the wild tribal music which accompanied the ceremony to sacrifice Ann to Kong. He wrote the score in two weeks and the music recording cost around $50,000. The film became a "landmark of film scoring", as it showed the power music has to manipulate audience emotions. Steiner constructed the score on Wagnerian leitmotif principle, which calls for special themes for leading characters and concepts. The theme of the monster is recognizable as a descending three-note chromatic motif. After the death of King Kong, the Kong theme and the Fay Wray theme converge, underlining the "Beauty and the Beast" type relationship between the characters. The music in the film's finale helped express the tender feelings Kong had for the woman without the film having to explicitly state it. The majority of the music is heavy and loud, but some of the music is a bit lighter. For example, when the ship sails into Skull Island, Steiner keeps the music calm and quiet with a small amount of texture in the harps to help characterize the ship as it cautiously moves through the misty waters. Steiner received a bonus from his work, as Cooper credited 25 percent of the film's success to the film score. Before he died, Steiner admitted King Kong was one of his favorite scores.

King Kong quickly made Steiner one of the most respected names in Hollywood. He continued as RKO's music director for two more years, until 1936. Max married Louise Klos, a harpist, in 1936. They had a son, Ron, together and they divorced in 1946. Steiner composed, arranged and conducted another 55 films, including three of Fred Astaire and Ginger Rogers' dance musicals. Additionally, Steiner wrote a sonata used in Katharine Hepburn's first film, Bill of Divorcement (1932). RKO producers, including Selznick, often came to him when they had problems with films, treating him as if he were a music "doctor". Steiner was asked to compose a score for Of Human Bondage (1934), which originally lacked music. He added musical touches to significant scenes. Director John Ford called on Steiner to score his film, The Lost Patrol (1934), which lacked tension without music.

John Ford hired Steiner again to compose for his next film, The Informer (1935), before Ford began production of the film. Ford even asked his screenwriter to meet with Steiner during the writing phase to collaborate. This was unusual for Steiner who typically refused to compose a score from anything earlier than a rough cut of the film. Because Steiner scored the music before and during film production, Ford would sometimes shoot scenes in synchronization with the music Steiner composed rather than the usual practice of film composers synchronizing music to the film's scenes. Consequently, Steiner directly influenced the development of the protagonist, Gypo. Victor McLaglen, who played Gypo, rehearsed his walking in order to match the fumbling leitmotif Steiner had created for Gypo. This unique film production practice was successful; the film was nominated for six Academy Awards and won four, including Steiner's first Academy Award for Best Scoring. This score helped to exemplify Steiner's ability to encompass the essence of a film in a single theme. The main title of the film's soundtrack has three specific aspects. First, the heavy-march-like theme helps to describe the oppressive military and main character Gypo's inevitable downfall. Second, the character's theme is stern and sober and puts the audience into the correct mood for the film. Finally, the theme of the music contains some Irish folk song influences which serves to better characterize the Irish historical setting and influence of the film. The theme is not heard consistently throughout the film and serves rather as a framework for the other melodic motifs heard throughout different parts of the film.

The score for this film is made up of many different themes which characterize the different personages and situations in the film. Steiner helps portray the genuine love Katie has for the main character Gypo. In one scene, Katie calls after Gypo as a solo violin echos the falling cadence of her voice. In another scene, Gypo sees an advertisement for a steamship to America and instead of the advertisement, sees himself holding Katie's hand on the ship. Wedding bells are heard along with organ music and he sees Katie wearing a veil and holding a bouquet. In a later scene, the Katie theme plays as a drunk Gypo sees a beautiful woman at the bar, insinuating he had mistaken her for Katie. Other musical themes included in the film score are an Irish folk song on French horns for Frankie McPhilip, a warm string theme for Dan and Gallagher and Mary McPhillip, and a sad theme on English horn with harp for the blind man.The most important motif in the film is the theme of betrayal relating to how Gypo betrays his friend Frankie: the "blood-money" motif. The theme is heard as the Captain throws the money on the table after Frankie is killed. The theme is a four note descending tune on harp; the first interval is the tritone. As the men are deciding who will be the executioner, the motif is repeated quietly and perpetually to establish Gypo's guilt and the musical motif is synchronized with the dripping of water in the prison. As it appears in the end of the film, the theme is played at a fortissimo volume as Gypo staggers into the church, ending the climax with the clap of the cymbals, indicating Gypo's penitence, no longer needing to establish his guilt.

Silent film mannerisms are still seen in Steiner's composition such as when actions or consequences are accompanied by a sforzato chord immediately before it, followed by silence. An example of this is remarked in the part of the film when Frankie confronts Gypo looking at his reward for arrest poster. Steiner uses minor "Mickey Mousing" techniques in the film. Through this score, Steiner showed the potential of film music, as he attempted the show the internal struggles inside of Gypo's mind through the mixing of different themes such as the Irish "Circassian Circle", the "blood-money" motif, and Frankie's theme. The score concludes with an original "Sancta Maria" by Steiner. Some writers have erroneously referred to the cue as featuring Franz Schubert's "Ave Maria".

In 1937, Steiner was hired by Frank Capra to conduct Dimitri Tiomkin's score for Lost Horizon (1937) as a safeguard in case Steiner needed to rewrite the score by an inexperienced Tiomkin; however, according to Hugo Friedhofer, Tiomkin specifically asked for Steiner, preferring him over the film studio's then music director. Selznick set up his own production company in 1936 and recruited Steiner to write the scores for his next three films.

=== Composing for Warner Bros. (1937–1953) ===
In April 1937, Steiner left RKO and signed a long-term contract with Warner Bros.; he would, however, continue to work for Selznick. The first film he scored for Warner Bros. was The Charge of the Light Brigade (1936). Steiner became a mainstay at Warner Bros., scoring 140 of their films over the next 30 years alongside Hollywood stars such as Bette Davis, Errol Flynn, Humphrey Bogart, and James Cagney. Steiner frequently worked with composer Hugo Friedhofer who was hired as an orchestrator for Warner Bros; Friedholfer would orchestrate more than 50 of Steiner's pieces during his career. In 1938, Steiner wrote and arranged the first "composed for film" piece, Symphony Moderne which a character plays on the piano and later plays as a theme in Four Daughters (1938) and is performed by a full orchestra in Four Wives (1939).

In 1939, Steiner was borrowed from Warner Bros. by Selznick to compose the score for Gone with the Wind (1939), which became one of Steiner's most notable successes. Steiner was the only composer Selznick considered for scoring the film. Steiner was given only three months to complete the score, despite composing twelve more film scores in 1939, more than he would in any other year of his career. Because Selznick was concerned Steiner wouldn't have enough time to finish the score, he had Franz Waxman write an additional score in case Steiner was unable to finish in time. To meet the deadline, Steiner sometimes worked for 20-hours straight, assisted by doctor-administered Benzedrine to stay awake. When the film was released, it was the longest film score ever composed, nearly three hours. The composition consisted of 16 main themes and nearly 300 musical segments. Due to the score's length, Steiner had help from four orchestrators and arrangers, including Heinz Roemheld, to work on the score. Selznick had asked Steiner to use only pre-existing classical music to help cut down on cost and time, but Steiner tried to convince him that filling the picture with swatches of classic concert music or popular works would not be as effective as an original score, which could be used to heighten the emotional content of scenes. Steiner ignored Selznick's wishes and composed an entirely new score. Selznick's opinion about using original scoring may have changed due to the overwhelming reaction to the film, nearly all of which contained Steiner's music. A year later, he even wrote a letter emphasizing the value of original film scores. The most well known of Steiner's themes for the score is the "Tara" theme for the O'Hara family plantation. Steiner explains Scarlett's deep-founded love for her home is why "the 'Tara' theme begins and ends with the picture and permeates the entire score". The film went on to win ten Academy Awards, although not for Best Original Score, which instead went to Herbert Stothart for The Wizard of Oz. The score of Gone with the Wind is ranked #2 by AFI as the second greatest American film score of all time.

Now, Voyager would be the film score for which Steiner would win his second Academy Award. Kate Daubney attributes the success of this score to Steiner's ability to "[balance] the scheme of thematic meaning with the sound of the music." Steiner used motifs and thematic elements in the music to emphasize the emotional development of the narrative. After finishing Now, Voyager (1942), Steiner was hired to score the music for Casablanca (1942). Steiner would typically wait until the film was edited before scoring it, and after watching Casablanca, he decided the song "As Time Goes By" by Herman Hupfeld wasn't an appropriate addition to the movie and he wanted to replace it with a song of his own composition; however, Ingrid Bergman had just cut her hair short in preparation for filming For Whom the Bell Tolls (1943), so she couldn't re-film the section with Steiner's song. Stuck with "As Time Goes By", Steiner embraced the song and made it the center theme of his score. Steiner's score for Casablanca was nominated for the Academy Award for Best Scoring of a Dramatic or Comedy Picture, losing to The Song of Bernadette (1943). Steiner received his third and final Oscar in 1944 for Since You Went Away (1944). Steiner actually first composed the theme from Since You Went Away while helping counterbalance Franz Waxman's moody score for Rebecca. Producer David O. Selznick liked the theme so much, he asked Steiner to include it in Since You Went Away. In 1947, Max married Leonette Blair.

Steiner also found success with the film noir genre. The Big Sleep, Mildred Pierce, and The Letter were his best film noir scores of the 1940s. The Letter is set in Singapore, the tale of murder begins with the loud main musical theme during the credits, which sets the tense and violent mood of the film. The main theme characterizes Leslie, the main character, by her tragic passion. The main theme is heard in the confrontation between Leslie and the murdered man's wife in the Chinese shop. Steiner portrays this scene through the jangling of wind chimes which crescendos as the wife emerges through opium smoke. The jangling continues until the wife asks Leslie to take off her shawl, after which the theme blasts indicating the breaking point of emotions of these women. Steiner's score for The Letter was nominated for the 1941 Academy Award for Best Original Score, losing to Walt Disney's Pinocchio. In the score for The Big Sleep, Steiner uses musical thematic characterization for the characters in the film. The theme for Philip Marlowe (Humphrey Bogart) is beguiling and ironic, with a playful grace note at the end of the motif, portrayed mixed between major and minor. At the end of the film, his theme is played fully in major chords and finishes by abruptly ending the chord as the film terminates (this was an unusual film music practice in Hollywood at the time). According to Christopher Palmer, the love theme for Bogart's Philip and Lauren Bacall's Vivian is one of Steiner's strongest themes. Steiner uses the contrast of high strings and low strings and brass to emphasize Philip's feelings for Vivian opposed with the brutality of the criminal world. In 1947, Steiner scored a film noir Western, Pursued.

Steiner had more success with the Western genre of film, writing the scores for over twenty large-scale Westerns, most with epic-inspiring scores "about empire building and progress", like Dodge City (1939), The Oklahoma Kid (1939), and Virginia City (1940). Dodge City, starring Errol Flynn and Olivia de Havilland, is a good example of Steiner's handling of typical scenes of the Western genre. Steiner used a "lifting, loping melody" which reflected the movement and sounds of wagons, horses, and cattle. Steiner showed a love for combining Westerns and romance, as he did in They Died with Their Boots On (1941), also starring Flynn and de Havilland. The Searchers (1956) is, today, considered his greatest Western.

=== Later works (1953–1965) ===
Although his contract ended in 1953, Steiner returned to Warner Bros. in 1958 and scored several films such as Band of Angels, Marjorie Morningstar, and John Paul Jones, and later ventured into television. Steiner still preferred large orchestras and leitmotif techniques during this part of his career. Steiner's pace slowed significantly in the mid-1950s, and he began freelancing. In 1954, RCA Victor asked Steiner to prepare and conduct an orchestral suite of music from Gone with the Wind for a special LP, which was later issued on CD. There are also acetates of Steiner conducting the Warner Brothers studio orchestra in music from many of his film scores. Composer Victor Young and Steiner were good friends, and Steiner completed the film score for China Gate, because Young had died before he could finish it. The credit frame reads: "Music by Victor Young, extended by his old friend, Max Steiner." There are numerous soundtrack recordings of Steiner's music as soundtracks, collections, and recordings by others. Steiner wrote into his seventies, ailing and near blind, but his compositions "revealed a freshness and fertility of invention." A theme for A Summer Place in 1959, written when Steiner was 71, became one of Warner Brothers' biggest hit-tunes for years and a re-recorded pop standard. This memorable instrumental theme spent nine weeks at #1 on the Billboard Hot 100 singles chart in 1960 (in an instrumental cover version by Percy Faith). Steiner continued to score films produced by Warner until the mid-sixties.

In 1963, Steiner began writing his autobiography. Although it was completed, it was never published, and is the only source available on Steiner's childhood. A copy of the manuscript resides with the rest of the Max Steiner Collection at Brigham Young University in Provo, Utah. Steiner scored his last piece in 1965; however, he claimed he would have scored more films had he been offered the opportunity. His lack of work in the last years of his life was due to Hollywood's decreased interest in his scores caused by new film producers and new taste in film music. Another contribution to his declining career was his failing eyesight and deteriorating health, which caused him to reluctantly retire. Tony Thomas cited Steiner's last score as, "a weak coda to a mighty career."

== Death ==
Steiner died of congestive heart failure in Hollywood, aged 83. He is entombed in the Great Mausoleum at Forest Lawn Memorial Park Cemetery in Glendale, California.

== Methods of composing ==
=== Music as background to dialogue ===
In the early days of sound, producers avoided underscoring music behind dialogue, feeling the audience would wonder where the music was coming from. As a result, Steiner noted, "They began to add a little music here and there to support love scenes or silent sequences." But in scenes where music might be expected, such as a nightclub, ballroom, or theater, the orchestra fit in more naturally and was used often. In order to justify the addition of music in scenes where it wasn't expected, music was integrated into the scene through characters or added more conspicuously. For example, a shepherd boy might play a flute along with the orchestra heard in the background, or a random, wandering violinist might follow around a couple during a love scene; however, because half of the music was recorded on the set, Steiner says it led to a great deal of inconvenience and cost when scenes were later edited, because the score would often be ruined. As recording technology improved during this period, he was able to record the music synced to the film and could change the score after the film was edited. Steiner explains his own typical method of scoring:

When a picture is finished and finally edited, it is turned over to me. Then I time it: not by stop watch, however, as many do. I have the film put through a special measuring machine and then a cue sheet created which gives me the exact time, to a split second, in which an action takes place, or a word is spoken. While these cue sheets are being made, I begin to work on themes for the different characters and scenes, but without regard to the required timing. During this period I also digest what I have seen, and try to plan the music for this picture. There may be a scene that is played a shade too slowly which I might be able to quicken with a little animated music; or, to a scene that is too fast, I may be able to give a little more feeling by using slower music. Or perhaps the music can clarify a character's emotion, such as intense suffering, which is not demanded or fully revealed by a silent close-up.

Steiner often followed his instincts and his own reasoning in creating film scores. For example, when he chose to go against Selznick's instruction to use classical music for Gone with the Wind. Steiner stated:

It is my conviction that familiar music, however popular, does not aid the underlying score of a dramatic picture. I believe that, while the American people are more musically minded than any other nation in the world, they are still not entirely familiar with all the old and new masters' works ... Of course there are many in our industry who disagree with my viewpoint.

Scores from the classics were sometimes harmful to a picture, especially when they drew unwanted attention to themselves by virtue of their familiarity. For example, films like 2001: A Space Odyssey, The Sting, and Manhattan, had scores with recognizable tunes instead of having a preferred "subliminal" effect. Steiner, was among the first to acknowledge the need for original scores for each film.

Steiner felt knowing when to start and stop was the hardest part of proper scoring, since incorrect placement of music can speed up a scene meant to be slow and vice versa: "Knowing the difference is what makes a film composer." He also notes that many composers, contrary to his own technique, would fail to subordinate the music to the film:

I've always tried to subordinate myself to the picture. A lot of composers make the mistake of thinking of film as a concert platform on which they can show off. This is not the place ... If you get too decorative, you lose your appeal to the emotions. My theory is that the music should be felt rather than heard.

=== Click tracks ===
Although some scholars cite Steiner as the inventor of the click track technique as such, he, possibly alongside Roy Webb, was the first to use the technique in film scoring. Carl W. Stalling and Scott Bradley used the technique first in cartoon music. The click-track allows the composer to sync music and film together more precisely. The technique involves punching holes into the soundtrack film based on the mathematics of metronome speed. As the holes pass through a projector, the orchestra and conductor can hear the clicking sound through headphones, allowing them to record the music along the exact timing of the film. This technique allowed conductors and orchestras to match the music with perfection to the timing of the film, eliminating the previous necessity to cut off or stop music in the middle of recording as had been done previously. Popularized by Steiner in film music, this technique allowed Steiner to "catch the action", creating sounds for small details on screen. In fact, Steiner reportedly spent more of his time matching the action to the music than composing the melodies and motifs, as creating and composing came easy to him.

=== Leitmotifs ===
With Steiner's background in his European musical training largely consisting of operas and operettas and his experience with stage music, he brought with him a slew of old-fashioned techniques he contributed to the development of the Hollywood film score. Although Steiner has been called, "the man who invented modern film music", he himself claimed that, "the idea originated with Richard Wagner ... If Wagner had lived in this century, he would have been the No. 1 film composer." Wagner was the inventor of the leitmotif, and this influenced Steiner's composition. In his music, Steiner relied heavily on leitmotifs. He would also quote pre-existing, recognizable melodies in his scores, such as national anthems. Steiner was known and often criticized for his use of Mickey Mousing or "catching the action". This technique is characterized by the precise matching of music with the actions or gestures on screen. Steiner was criticized for using this technique too frequently. For example, in Of Human Bondage, Steiner created a limping effect with his music whenever the clubfooted character walked.

One of the important principles that guided Steiner whenever possible was his rule: Every character should have a theme. "Steiner creates a musical picture that tells us all we need to know about the character." To accomplish this, Steiner synchronized the music, the narrative action, and the leitmotif as a structural framework for his compositions. It may be added that Steiner's leitmotifs were more direct and less subtle than those by his contemporary Austrian-émigré competitors in the Hollywood scoring market, such as Erich Korngold or Ernst Toch. Unlike the latter two, Steiner took on large staff to help with orchestration, allowing him to multiply his output.

A good example of how the characters and the music worked together is best exemplified by his score for The Glass Menagerie (1950):

- For the physically crippled heroine, Laura, Steiner had to "somehow capture in sound her escape from the tawdriness of reality into her make-believe world of glass figures ... The result is tone-colour of an appropriately glassy quality; ... a free use of vibraphone, celesta, piano, glockenspiel and triangle enhances the fragility and beauty of the sound."
- For Laura's well-traveled soldier brother: "Tom's theme has a big-city blues-type resonance. It is also rich and warm ... [and] tells us something of Tom's good-hearted nature."
- For Jim, Laura's long-awaited 'gentleman caller' who soon transforms her life: Steiner's "clean-limbed melody reflects his likeableness and honesty ... Elements of Jim's theme are built into the dance-band music at the 'Paradise' as he assures her of her essential beauty and begins successfully to counter her deep-seated inferiority complex. Upon their return home, the music darkens the scene in preparation for Jim's disclosure that he is already committed to another girl."

Another film which exemplifies the synchronizing of character and music is The Fountainhead (1949): The character of Roark, an idealist architect (played by Gary Cooper):

Steiner's theme for the hero is fraught with a true emotion and a genuine idealism and aspiration. It surges upward in 'masculine' style, whilst Roark's mistress's theme wends downwards in curves of typically feminine shapeliness ... He above, she traveling up in the workmen's elevator: the music seems to draw them together in mutual fulfillment ... The score brings dignity and grandeur to the picture.

In the same way that Steiner created a theme for each character in a film, Steiner's music developed themes to express emotional aspects of general scenes which originally lacked emotional content. For example:

- King Kong (1933): The music told the story of what was happening in the film. It expressed Kong's "feelings of tenderness towards his helpless victim." The music underscores feelings that the camera simply cannot express. The score of the film showed "the basic power of music to terrorize and to humanize."
- The Letter (1940), starring Bette Davis: The music of this film creates an atmosphere of "tropical tension and violence" by "blasting the credits fortissimo across the theater." Steiner's score emphasizes the tragic and passionate themes of the film.
- The Big Sleep (1946): The music of this film "darkens to match" the changing atmosphere of the film. It creates a claustrophobic feeling by including high strings "pitted rhythmically" against low strings and brass.
- The Treasure of the Sierra Madre (1948): Steiner uses the music to intensify the anguish of Bogart and Holt, when they are left to dig a mine in the hot sun. The music "assumes the character of a fiercely protesting funeral march." The timing of the music caves in as the mind caves in on Bogart. The music also serves to emphasize the theme of greed. It "tells us the nature of the thoughts flashing through Holt's mind as he stands outside the ruined mine;" however, when the warm tones of the music rise again, it reflects Holt's goodness as he saves Bogart from the collapsed mine. This "climax is marked by a grandioso statement of the theme on full orchestra."

=== Realistic and background music ===
When adding a music score to a picture, Steiner used a "spotting process" in which he and the director of the film would watch the film in its entirety and discuss where underscoring of diegetic music would begin and end. Another technique Steiner used was the mixing of realistic and background music. For example, a character humming to himself is realistic music, and the orchestra might play his tune, creating a background music effect that ties into the film. Steiner was criticized for this technique as the awareness of the film music can ruin the narrative illusion of the film; however, Steiner understood the importance of letting the film take the spotlight, making the music, "subordinate..to the picture," stating that, "if it gets too decorative, it loses its emotional appeal." Before 1932, producers of sound films tried to avoid the use of background music, because viewers would wonder where the music was coming from. Steiner was known for writing using atmospheric music without melodic content for certain neutral scenes in music. Steiner designed a melodic motion to create normal-sounding music without taking too much attention away from the film. In contrast, Steiner sometimes used diegetic, or narrative based music, in order to emphasize certain emotions or contradict them. According to Steiner, there is, "no greater counterpoint ... than gay music underlying a tragic scene or vice versa."

== Influence ==
=== Industry recognition ===
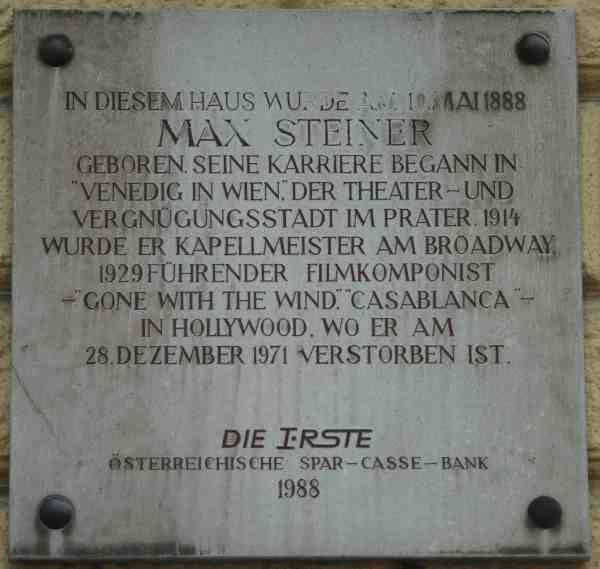
Plaque for Steiner at his birthplace in Praterstraße 72, Vienna

Three of Max Steiner's scores won the Academy Award for Best Original Score: The Informer (1935), Now, Voyager (1942), and Since You Went Away (1944). Steiner received a certificate for The Informer. He originally received plaques for Now, Voyager and Since You Went Away, but those plaques were replaced with Academy Award statuettes in 1946. As an individual, Steiner was nominated for a total of 20 Academy Awards, and won two. Prior to 1939, the academy recognized a studio's music department, rather than the individual composer, with a nomination in the scoring category. During this time, five of Steiner's scores including The Lost Patrol and The Charge of the Light Brigade were nominated, but the academy does not consider these nominations to belong to Max Steiner himself. Consequently, even though Steiner's score for The Informer won the Academy Award in 1936, the academy does not officially consider Steiner as the individual winner of the award, as Steiner accepted the award on behalf of RKO's music department of which he was the department head. Steiner's 20 nominations make him the third most nominated individual in the history of the scoring categories, behind John Williams and Alfred Newman.

The United States Postal Service issued its "American Music Series" stamps on 16 September 1999, to pay tribute to renowned Hollywood composers, including Steiner. After Steiner's death, Charles Gerhardt conducted the National Philharmonic Orchestra in an RCA Victor album of highlights from Steiner's career, titled Now Voyager. He also won a Golden Globe for Best Original Score for Life with Father (1947). Additional selections of Steiner scores were included on other RCA classic film albums during the early 1970s. The quadraphonic recordings were later digitally remastered for Dolby surround sound and released on CD. In 1975, Steiner was honored with a star located at 1551 Vine Street on the Hollywood Walk of Fame for his contribution to motion pictures. In 1995, Steiner was inducted posthumously into the Songwriters Hall of Fame. In commemoration of Steiner's 100th birthday, a memorial plaque was unveiled in 1988 at Steiner's birthplace, the Hotel Nordbahn (now Austria Classic Hotel Wien) on Praterstraße 72. In 1990, Steiner was one of the first to be recognized for Lifetime Achievement by an online awards site.

=== Legacy among composers ===
In Kurt London's Film Music, London expressed the opinion that American film music was inferior to European film music because it lacked originality of composition; he cited the music of Steiner as an exception to the rule. Steiner, along with contemporaries Erich Wolfgang Korngold and Alfred Newman, set the style and forms of film music of the time period and for film scores to come. Known for their similar music styles, Roy Webb was also Steiner's contemporary and they were friends until Steiner's death. Webb's score for Mighty Joe Young was reminiscent of Steiner. James Bond composer John Barry cited Steiner as an influence of his work. James Newton Howard, who composed the score for the 2005 remake of King Kong, stated that he was influenced by Steiner's score; his descending theme when Kong first appears is reminiscent of Steiner's score. In fact, during the tribal sacrifice scene of the 2005 version, the music playing is from Steiner's score of the same scene in the 1933 version. Composer of the Star Wars film score, John Williams cited Steiner as well as other European emigrant composers in the 1930s and 1940s "Golden Age" of film music as influences of his work. In fact, George Lucas wanted Williams to use the scores of Steiner and Korngold as influences for the music for Star Wars, despite the rarity of grandiose film music and the lack of use of leitmotifs and full orchestrations during the 1970s.

Often compared to his contemporary Erich Wolfgang Korngold, his rival and friend at Warner Bros., the music of Steiner was often seen by critics as inferior to Korngold. Composer David Raksin stated that the music of Korngold was, "of a higher order with a much wider sweep;" however, according to William Darby and Jack Du Bois's American Film Music, even though other film score composers may have produced greater individual scores than Steiner, no composer ever created as many "very good" ones as Steiner. Despite the inferiority of Steiner's individual scores, his influence was largely historical. Steiner was one of the first composers to reintroduce music into films after the invention of talking films. Steiner's score for King Kong modeled the method of adding background music into a movie. Some of his contemporaries did not like his music. Miklós Rózsa criticized Steiner for his use of Mickey Mousing and did not like his music, but Rózsa conceded that Steiner had a successful career and had a good "melodic sense".

Now referred to as the "father of film music" or the "dean of film music", Steiner had written or arranged music for over three hundred films by the end of his career. George Korngold, son of Erich Korngold, produced the Classic Film Score Series albums which included the music of Steiner. Albert K. Bender established the Max Steiner Music Society with international membership, publishing journals and newsletters and a library of audio recordings. When the Steiner collection went to Brigham Young University in 1981, the organization disbanded. The Max Steiner Memorial Society was formed in the United Kingdom continue the work of the Max Steiner Music Society.

== Filmography ==
The American Film Institute respectively ranked Steiner's scores for Gone with the Wind (1939) and King Kong (1933) #2 and #13 on their list of the 25 greatest film scores. His scores for the following films were also nominated for the list:

- The Informer (1935)
- Jezebel (1938)
- Dark Victory (1939)
- Casablanca (1942)
- Now, Voyager (1942)
- Adventures of Don Juan (1948)
- Johnny Belinda (1948)
- The Treasure of the Sierra Madre (1948)
- A Summer Place (1959)

== See also ==
- List of Austrians in music
