= Men in black =

Government agents who supposedly intimidate UFO witnesses

An artistic depiction of a man in black.

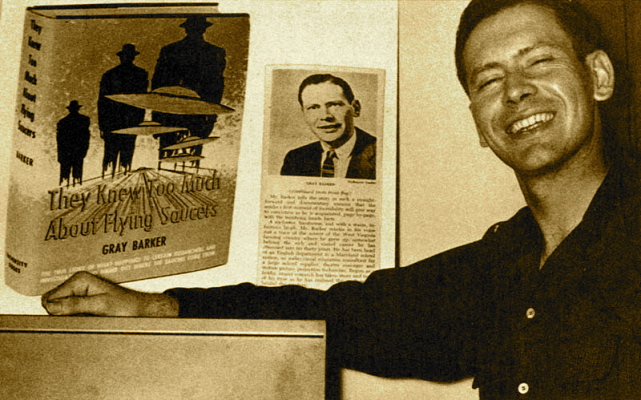
Gray Barker, posing with promotional materials for his book, They Knew Too Much About Flying Saucers. Several MIB appear in silhouette on the cover.

In popular culture and UFO conspiracy theories, men in black (MIB) are allegedly government agents dressed in dark suits, who question, intimidate, harass, and threaten unidentified flying object (UFO) witnesses to keep them silent about what they have seen. The term is also frequently used to describe mysterious men working for unknown organizations, as well as various branches of government allegedly tasked with protecting government UFO secrets or performing other strange activities. They are typically described as tall men with expressionless faces, slightly pale skin, and usually wearing black suits with black sunglasses. "Men In Black" encounters are very common in American UFO conspiracy theories.

The term is generic, as it is used for any unusual, threatening, or strangely behaved individual whose appearance on the scene can be linked in some fashion with a UFO sighting.

Stories about men in black inspired the science fiction comedy franchise Men in Black and an album by the Stranglers.

== Folklore ==
Folklorist James R. Lewis compared accounts of men in black with tales of people encountering Lucifer, and speculated that they can be considered a kind of "psychological trauma".

== Ufologists ==
Men in black feature prominently in ufology, UFO folklore, and fan fiction. In the 1950s and 1960s, ufologists adopted a conspiratorial mindset and began fearing they would be subject to organized intimidation in retaliation for discovering "the truth of the UFOs".

In 1947, Harold Dahl claimed a man in a dark suit warned him not to discuss his alleged UFO sighting on Maury Island. In the mid-1950s, the ufologist Albert K. Bender claimed he was visited by men in dark suits who threatened and warned him not to continue investigating UFOs. He maintained that the men were secret government agents tasked with suppressing evidence of UFOs. The ufologist John Keel claimed to have had encounters with MIB and referred to them as "demonic supernaturals" with "dark skin and/or 'exotic' facial features". According to the ufologist Jerome Clark, reports of men in black represent "experiences" that "don't seem to have occurred in the world of consensus reality".

The historian Aaron Gulyas wrote: "During the 1970s, 1980s and 1990s, UFO conspiracy theorists would incorporate the Men in Black into their increasingly complex and paranoid visions."

Keel has argued that some MIB encounters can be explained as entirely mundane events perpetuated through folklore. In his book The Mothman Prophecies (1975), he describes a late-night outing in 1967, where he was mistaken for a MIB while searching for a phone to call a tow truck.

In his article "Gray Barker: My Friend, the Myth-Maker", John C. Sherwood claims that, in the late 1960s, at age 18, he cooperated when Gray Barker urged him to develop a hoax—which Barker subsequently published—about what Barker called "blackmen", three mysterious UFO inhabitants who silenced Sherwood's pseudonymous identity, "Dr. Richard H. Pratt".

== In popular culture ==
=== Music ===
Songs that reference the urban legend include "E.T.I (Extra Terrestrial Intelligence)" by the Blue Öyster Cult (1976), "Meninblack" by The Stranglers (1979), "Men in Black" by Frank Black, and "Men in Black" by Running Wild (1995). In 1981, The Stranglers also released a concept album, The Gospel According to the Meninblack.

=== Film and television ===
- The Alien Encounters (1979) features the Men in Black who harass a UFO investigator.
- In The Brother from Another Planet (1984), two Men in Black try to capture the alien protagonist.
- The 1997 science-fiction film Men in Black, starring Will Smith and Tommy Lee Jones, was loosely based on The Men in Black comic book series created by Lowell Cunningham and Sandy Carruthers. Also that year, the television film The Shadow Men presented a more serious take on the concept. Men in Black received an animated spin-off series, which is set in a separate continuity, and a series of live-action sequel films set in the first film's continuity.
- The Men in Black appear in The X-Files.
- In the animated Doctor Who serial Dreamland (2008) the Men in Black are androids controlled by a shadowy unseen group known as the Alliance of Shades. This story has them hide the truth about grey aliens at Area 51. They appear again in The Sarah Jane Adventures sequel The Vault of Secrets (2010) where they keep a hyperdimensional vault hidden.
- The Men in Black appear in The Masked Singer. They serve as the security personnel and backup dancers for the contestants and assist in the contestants' unmasking.
  - The Masked Dancer had a counterpart of the Men in Black called the Women in Black.

=== Games ===
- The video game franchise Half-Life features a character known as the G-Man, widely regarded as a pastiche of the concept.
- The Men in Black feature in Deus Ex as agents of Majestic 12.
- In XCOM: Enemy Unknown, the “Thin Men” are humanoid alien infiltrators posing as human agents wearing suits and sunglasses, behaving in a manner reminiscent of the Men in Black encounters.
- In tabletop role-playing game Delta Green, both Majestic 12 and Delta Green are inspired by Men in Black conspiracy folklore, with the former representing an alien-focused covert conspiracy and the latter originally serving as the government's Men in Black–style response to supernatural and Cthulhu Mythos threats.
- In Revelations: Persona, enemies known as the “Men in Black” (localized as “Blackman” in the original English release) appear as cybernetically enhanced agents serving as hostile security forces.

=== Sport ===
- Bilbao Basket nickname Beltzezko gizonak, Hombres de negro

== See also ==
- Agent (The Matrix)
- Black helicopter
- G-man
- SCP Foundation
- The Silence (Doctor Who)
- Confidence trick
