= Riffle, West Virginia =

- Unincorporated community
- Location within West Virginia Location within the United States
- Coordinates: 38°35′28″N 80°53′19″W
- Country: United States
- State: West Virginia
- County: Braxton
- Elevation: 791 ft (241 m)
- Time zone: UTC-5 (Eastern (EST))
  - Summer (DST): UTC-4 (EDT)
- Area codes: 304 & 681
- GNIS feature ID: 1554572

Riffle is an unincorporated community in Braxton County, West Virginia, United States. Riffle is located along the Elk River Railroad at the junction of County Routes 5/6, 6/6, and 7/6, 5.75 miles (9.25 km) north-northwest of Sutton.

== History ==
The community was named after Jacob Riffle, a Civil War veteran.

== Notable person ==
- Gray Barker, writer, was born in Riffle.
