= Austria Classic Hotel Wien =

Hotel in Vienna, Austria

Coordinates: 48°13′1.37″N 16°23′22.2″E

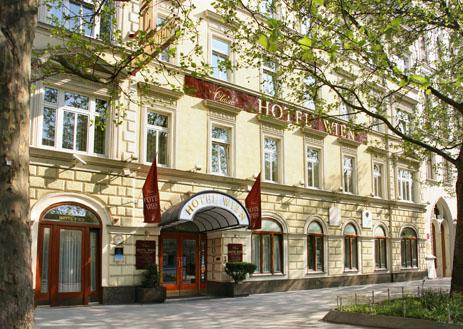

General information
- Location: Praterstraße 72, Vienna, Austria
- Opening: 1838
- Owner: Reinhard Blumauer Ines Pietsch (Manager) Ingeborg Seitz (Director)

Design and construction
- Developer: Josef Scheiflinger

Other information
- Number of rooms: 81

Website
- www.classic-hotelwien.at

The Austria Classic Hotel Wien is a three-star hotel, on Praterstraße in Vienna's second district, the Leopoldstadt. It is a member of the Austria Classic Hotels group and was named 'Hotel Nordbahn' until a rebranding in January 2008.

== History ==
The building 'Zum schwarzen Tor' on Praterstraße Nr.72 (named Jägerzeile until 1862) was completed in 1808. It originally served as residential house for a Peter Danhauser and only comprised two floors. In 1838, one year after Austria's first steam railway, the Emperor Ferdinand Northern Railway (German: Kaiser Ferdinands-Nordbahn, KFNB; Czech: Severní dráha císaře Ferdinanda, SDCF), had opened and the first station building of the Imperial and Royal North railway station on Nordbahnstraße was inaugurated. The existing building was extended by one floor, and established as 'Hotel Nordbahn', because of tourist accommodation needs through increased international traffic.

From 1843 to 1849 further extensions and adaptations were undertaken by hotel owner Josef Scheiflinger. Since that time the hotel has remained a family property. Between 1944 and 1945, during the Second World War, the building was partially destroyed, and was under Soviet administration until 1955. After the Allied Occupation of Austria, the hotel management was restored to Kommerzialrat Felix Scheiflinger, who had succeeded his father Josef Scheiflinger in 1908. In 1961, the management was transferred to Erika Blumauer, Felix Scheiflinger's daughter, who modernised the building and passed management to her son, Reinhard Blumauer, in 1973. Hotel Nordbahn was rebranded as Austria Classic Hotel Wien on 1 January 2008. In 2010 Reinhard Blumauer passed management to his daughter Ines Pietsch, who "became one of the youngest hotel managers of Austria".

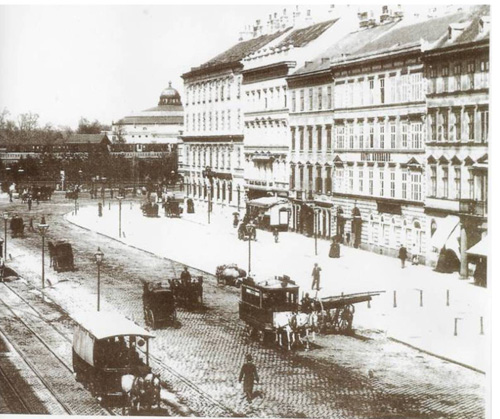
Praterstraße and Hotel Nordbahn before 1898

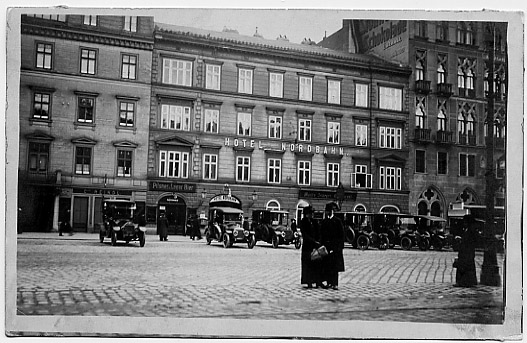
Hotel Nordbahn about 1910

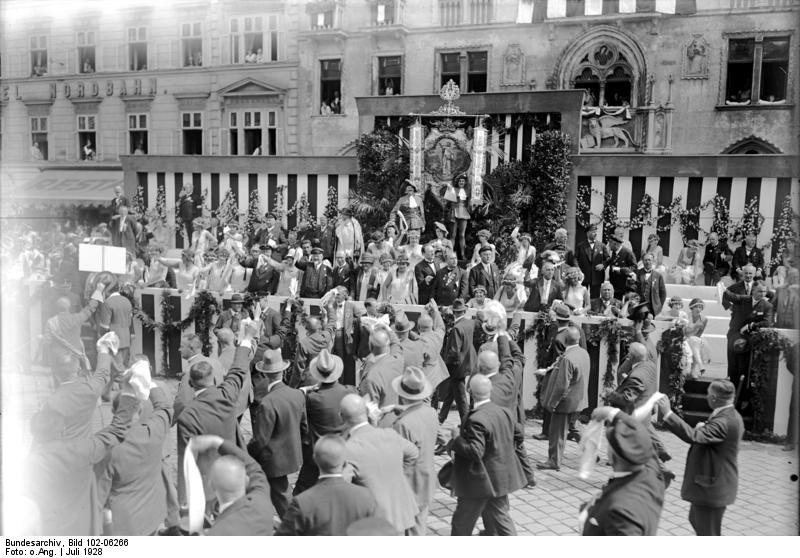
Hotel Nordbahn and the Dogenhof in 1928

== Notable guests ==
- The Austro-American composer and film score composition pioneer Max Steiner was born on 10 May 1888 in Hotel Nordbahn as 'Maximilian Raoul Steiner'. At his time Steiner was one of the best-known composers in Hollywood. Sometimes referred to as "the father of film music", Steiner is widely regarded today as one of the greatest film score composers in the history of cinema. Steiner composed hundreds of film scores, amongst those Casablanca, Gone with the Wind and King Kong. On the occasion of Max Steiner's 100th birthday a commemorative plaque was revealed at the hotel by owner Reinhard Blumauer, Bezirksvorsteher (head of district) Heinz Weißmann and Viennese mayor Helmut Zilk.
- Fine artist and playwright Stanisław Wyspiański, a Polish member of the Vienna Secession, resided in Hotel Nordbahn in summer 1904, en route from convalescent care in Bad Hall to his hometown Krakau. Since 1996 a plaque on the facade of the hotel commemorates the 50th anniversary of the Österreichisch-Polnische Gesellschaft (Austrian-Polish Society) and Wyspiański's frequent stays at the hotel, where amongst others he wrote his German dramatic fragment "Weimar 1829".
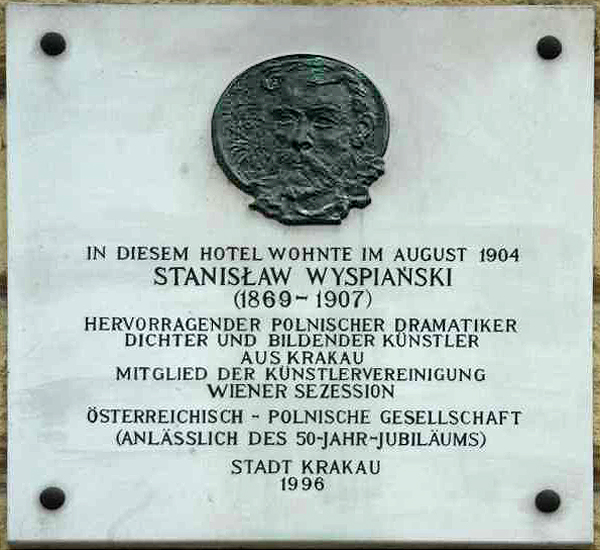
Commemorative plaque for Stanisław Wyspiański (since 1996)

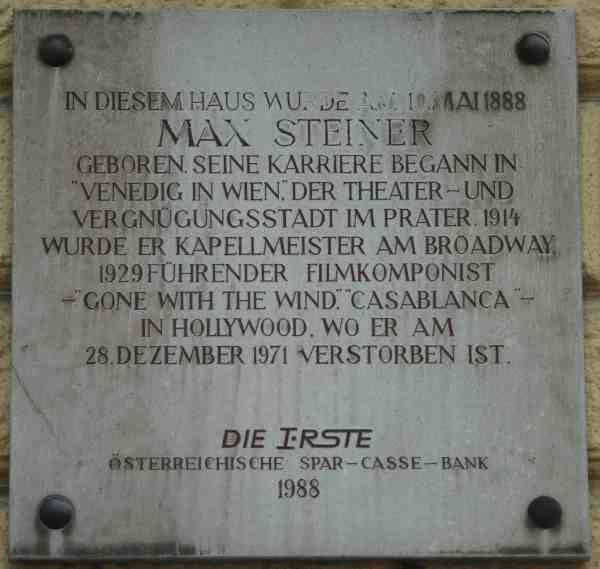
Commemorative plaque for Max Steiner (since 1988)

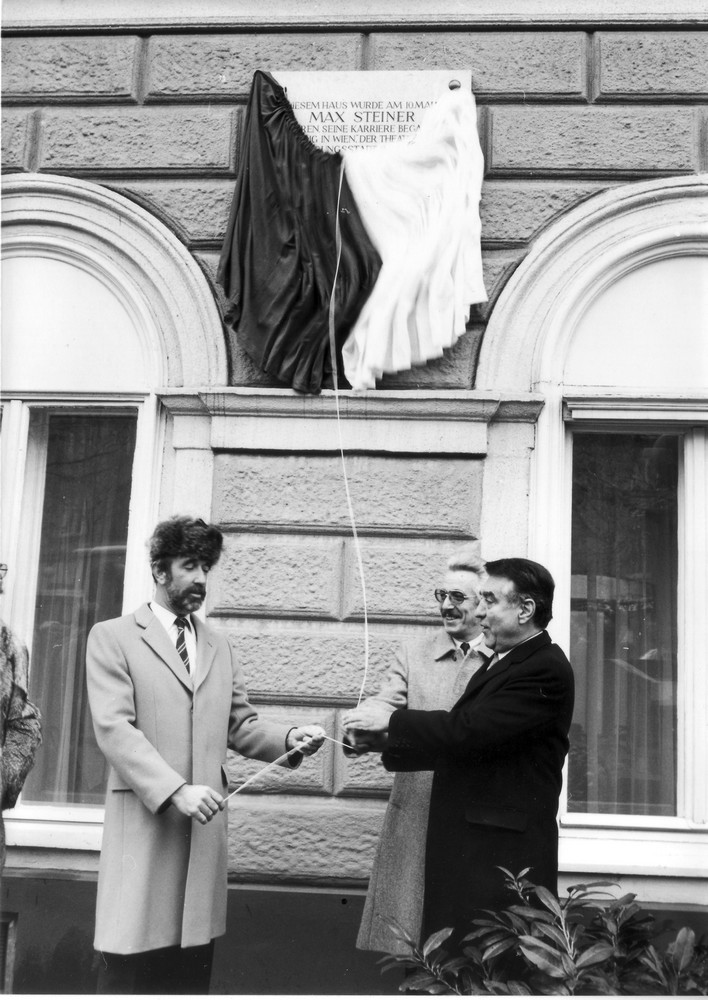
Unveiling the Max Steiner-plaque (f.l. R. Blumauer, H. Weißmann, H. Zilk)

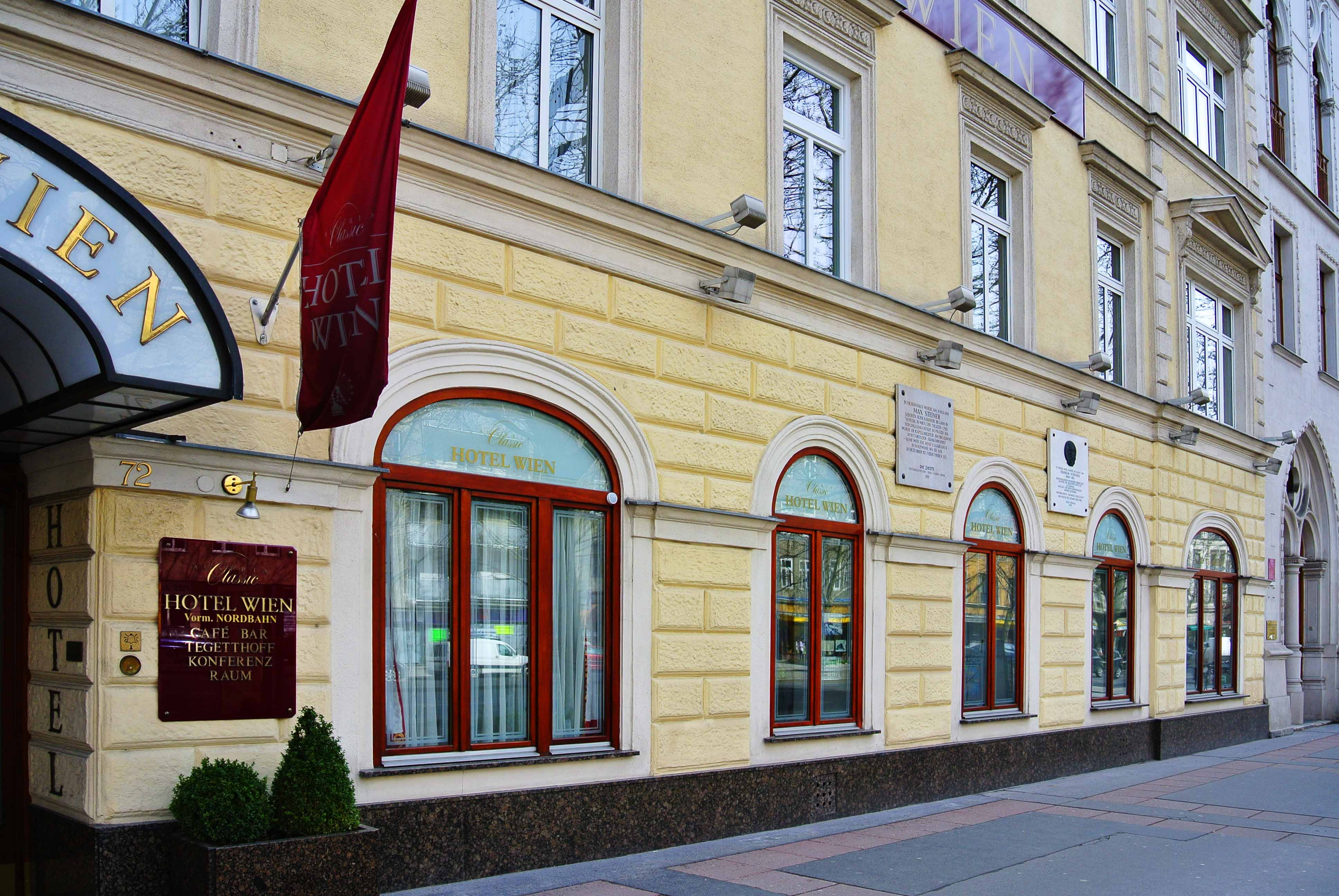
Both commemorative plaques at the hotel's facade

== Literature ==
Referencing Literature:

- Hermann Bahr (Hg.): Briefe von Josef Kainz. Wien: Rikola Verlag, 1922
- Helga Gibs: Leopoldstadt: kleine Welt am grossen Strom. Wien: Mohl, 1997, S.67, ISBN 3-900272-54-9
- Albert Paris Gütersloh: Die tanzende Törin: Roman. München: Langen-Müller, 1973
- Cilly Kugelmann, Hanno Loewy: So einfach war das: jüdische Kindheit und Jugend in Deutschland seit 1945. Zeitzeugnisse aus dem Jüdischen Museum Berlin. Köln: DuMont 2002
- Allan H. Mankoff: Mankoff's lusty Europe: the first all-purpose European guide to sex, love and romance. New York City: Viking Press, 1972
- Franz Julius Schneeberger: Banditen im Franck: Politisch-socialer Roman aus der Gegenwart. Von A. v. S. Band 2, Wien, Pest, Leipzig: A. Hartleben, 1867
- Siegfried Weyr: Wien: Magie der Inneren Stadt. Band 1 von Eine Stadt erzählt. Wien: Zsolnay, 1968
