= Dundy County UFO hoax =

1884 American hoax

The Dundy County UFO hoax was perpetrated by the Nebraska State Journal in 1884. According to the Journal, a group of cowboys found a long, cylindrical object in Dundy County, Nebraska, near the settlement of Max, after the crash of a meteor. The story was revealed to be a hoax in 1927 by Nebraska State Journal editors, though some continued to believe that the sighting was legitimate long after the hoax was revealed.

== Report and revelation of hoax ==
According to the Nebraska State Journal on June 8, 1884, a group of cowboys in Nebraska's Dundy County, near the settlement of Max, came across the remains of an "immense" meteor two days earlier. As one of the cowboys, Alf Williamson, approached, his face became riddled with blisters, some of his hair seared off, and his eyesight was damaged. The heat of the site was so unbearable that they could not further advance to investigate, so they left to return the remains—which included dispersed pieces of machinery, such as cogwheels—the next day. The site glowed throughout the night due to the heat emanating from the impact. With a group of other local residents, they returned to discover a long cylindrical tube at the site, "about fifty or sixty feet long" with a diameter of some "ten or twelve feet", The rancher for whom the cowboys worked, John Ellis, stated his intentions to claim the land as his own. Two days after the Nebraska State Journal's initial report, the newspaper claimed that the cylinder was broken down in the rain—first the remains became congealed pools of machinery, and then washed away entirely, leaving behind only a "faint, sweetish smell".

The story was both widely believed to be a hoax or a joke by its author soon after its publication. It was parodied throughout the campaign season of that year's presidential election. The Laramie Boomerang of Wyoming, for example—though initially carrying the story—reported on June 14 that the story was a political allegory for the temperance movement. It was published about a decade before the mass reports of mystery airships in the late 1890s, which included various sightings throughout Nebraska.

Despite the Nebraska State Journal admitting that it was a hoax in 1927, some people continued to believe that the sighting was legitimate. By 2007, the McCook Gazette continued to receive several inquiries about the event, over a hundred years after it reportedly occurred. In 2013, searches were undertaken in nearby Red Willow County, and the reported discovery of a green material led to further belief that the 1884 report was authentic. As of that year, some ufologists believed the report was a legitimate report of UFOs in the state. In a 1997 article in the Lincoln Journal Star, the Dundy County sighting is listed as one of the earliest in the state.
