= Albert K. Bender =

American UFO researcher (1921–2016)

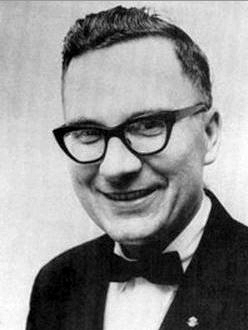
- Born: Albert K. Bender; June 16, 1921; Duryea, Pennsylvania
- Died: March 29, 2016 (aged 94); Los Angeles, California
- Occupations: Author, Ufologist
- Organization: International Flying Saucer Bureau
- Spouse: Betty Rose

Albert K. Bender (June 16, 1921 – March 29, 2016), author of the 1962 book Flying Saucers and the Three Men, was a ufologist. He served in the United States Army Air Forces during World War II. He was obsessed with the UFO phenomenon and became a UFO researcher, founding the International Flying Saucer Bureau. In 1965, he also founded the Max Steiner Music Society, dedicated to the eponymous composer.

== Early life ==
Albert Bender was born on June 16, 1921, in Duryea, Pennsylvania. He lived with his stepfather. Bender worked as a factory clerk. He was drawn to the supernatural; he fashioned haunted house decorations and horror movie scenes on his walls. He attended West Pittston High School in West Pittston, Pennsylvania. Bender was even featured in a newspaper article when he was 18 for writing to people all over the world. He wrote letters to correspondents in various countries including Peru, England, Romania and Japan. These letters were up to 20 pages long. His goal was to collect things from different countries, like coins or sand, through writing his correspondences. During high school, he was also part of the American Youth League and was elected the Jr. Vice President in January 1941 and was also elected national treasurer in October of that same year.

He visited Ottawa, Ontario, Canada for one week in August 1941. He moved from Pennsylvania around 1944. To express his thoughts, he kept a journal and wrote spook plays. Bender was Protestant. Bender enrolled in the United States Army Air Corps during World War II in 1942. He was stationed at Fort George G. Meade as a dental technician and later transferred to Langley, Virginia. He worked there as a clerk for the Dental Center. He also became an editor for an Army newspaper in Langely. He later went to Bridgeport, Connecticut.

After believing to have experienced a supernatural encounter in 1953, he was married on October 18, 1954 to Betty Rose. She believed that she had also been visited by supernatural personages.

== Supernatural encounters ==
He founded the International Flying Saucer Bureau (IFSB) (the first major civilian UFO club in the world) in 1952. Although the organization was a success at first, he suddenly shut it down in 1953.

Bender later claimed that in 1953 he had been approached by three men in black. These men visited him in his house and communicated with him telepathically. He received a metal disk from them and instruction. He reported that he felt like he was being transported. They apparently shared insights into the nature of UFOs, as well as the origin of UFOs with Bender. He became ill afterwards and didn't eat for three days. Following the visitation, Bender was encouraged by other UFO investigators to share what he had learned, but it was alleged by one such investigator, Dominik Lucchesi, that Bender was under the impression that the men in black were preventing him from sharing the totality of his findings through paranormally-induced headaches. The frequent headaches continued, and Bender's co-workers reported that he seemed scared.

His alleged experiences were recorded in They Knew Too Much About Flying Saucers by Gray Barker, Bender's IFSB associate. Bender's experience formed "the legend of the men in black." Bender did not speak of the event for nine years. In 1962, Bender wrote Flying Saucers and the Three Men to tell his own story. In the book, Bender recounts that the men in black were from another planet. Barker published his book, but there is speculation that Bender's experience was only a dream. Bender went on to manage a motel in California.

Bender was not the first one, however, to report visitations to UFO researchers from men in black. Bender reported that he had a second supernatural encounter. He stated he was visited by three shadowy figures. They did not touch the floor, but hovered above it. They told him that their human appearance was an illusion and that whatever information he told people about their visitation would not be believed. They supposedly told him that they captured people from Earth and used their bodies to disguise themselves.

Space Review was the official magazine about ufology news at that time in 1953. Late in the summer of 1953, Bender made a series of discoveries, which led him to believe that he had finally found the truth to the UFO cover-up. He had planned to reveal his findings in the October issue of the Space Review, but before the issue was published, Bender claimed to have been visited by three "men dressed in black," who had already read the unpublished report and confirmed his findings. The "silencers" as he called them, allegedly scared Bender to the point where he did not publish the report, but left a warning: "We advise those engaged in saucer work to please be very cautious." Bender then suspended publishing on his publication and dissolved the IFSB.

== Max Steiner Music Society ==
Albert K. Bender founded the Max Steiner Music Society in 1965. It was joined by actors John Wayne, Fred Astaire, and Vincent Price. They published a journal and a newsletter. The society officially ended in 1981. Bender has helped locate materials and information about Steiner's career.

== Photo gallery ==
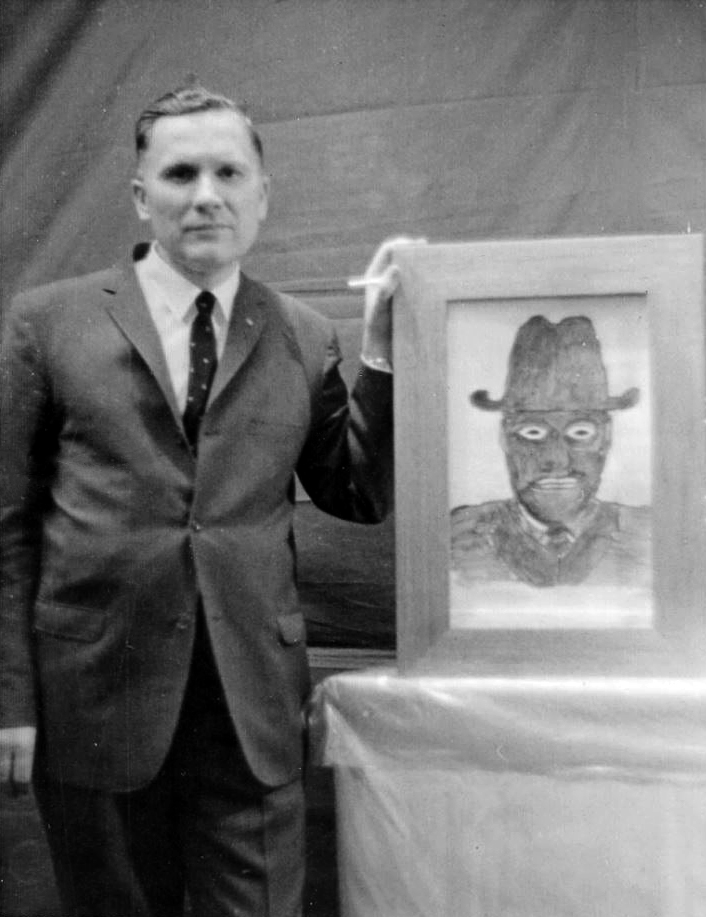
Albert K. Bender portrait

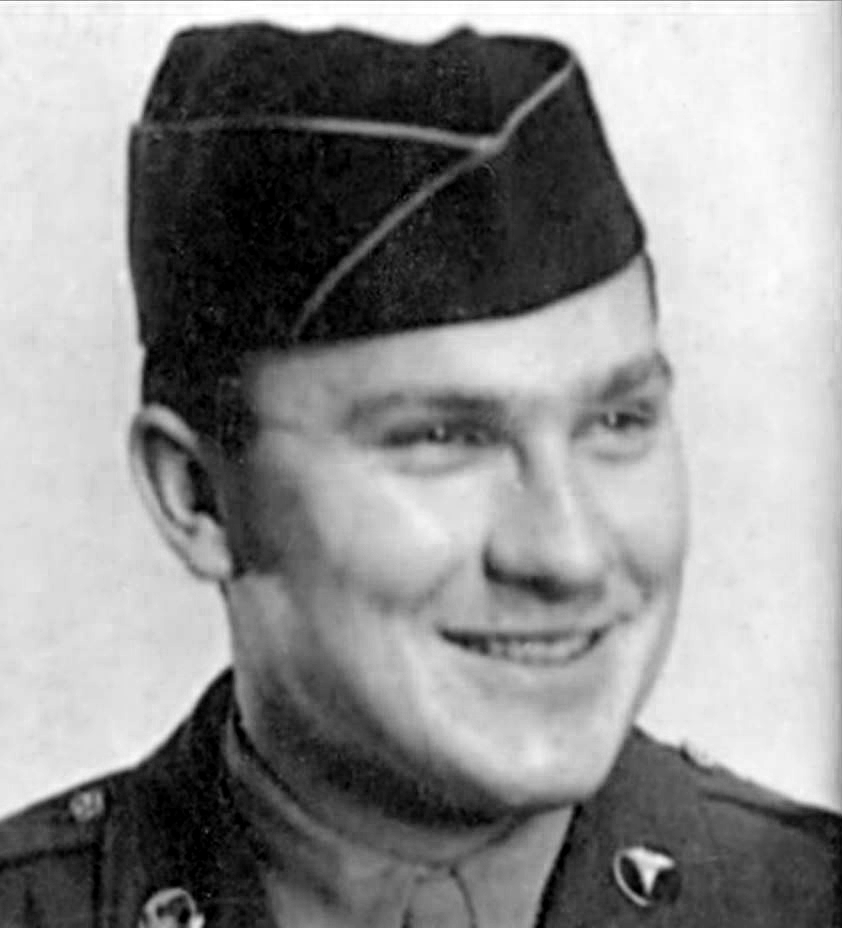
Albert K. Bender military portrait, World War II

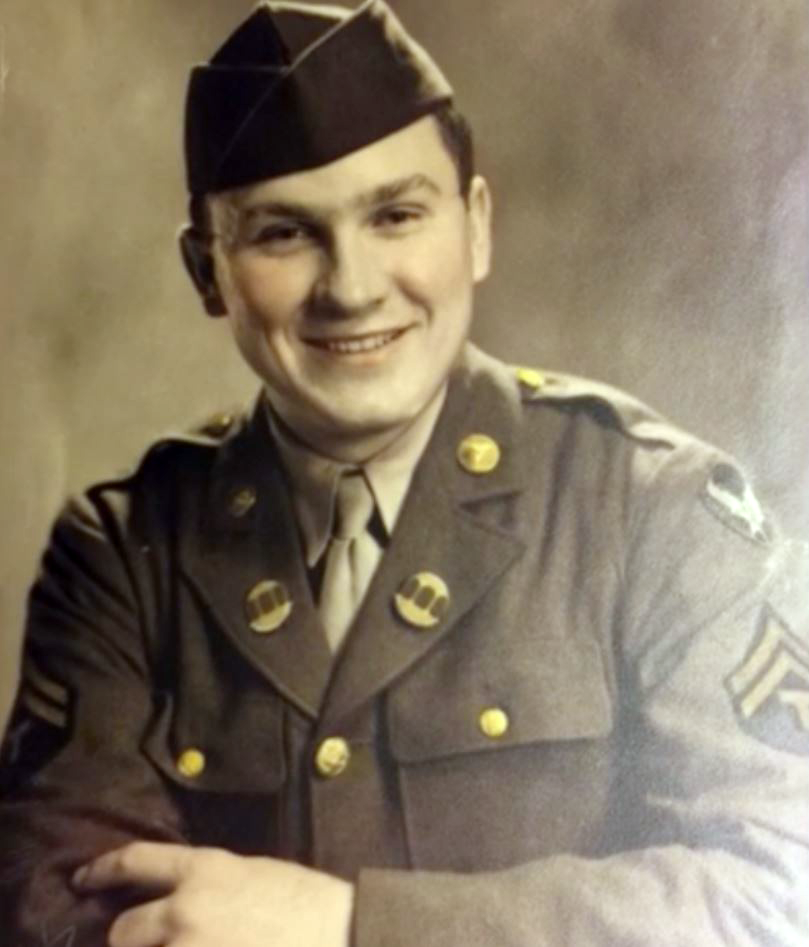
Albert K. Bender military portrait, World War II

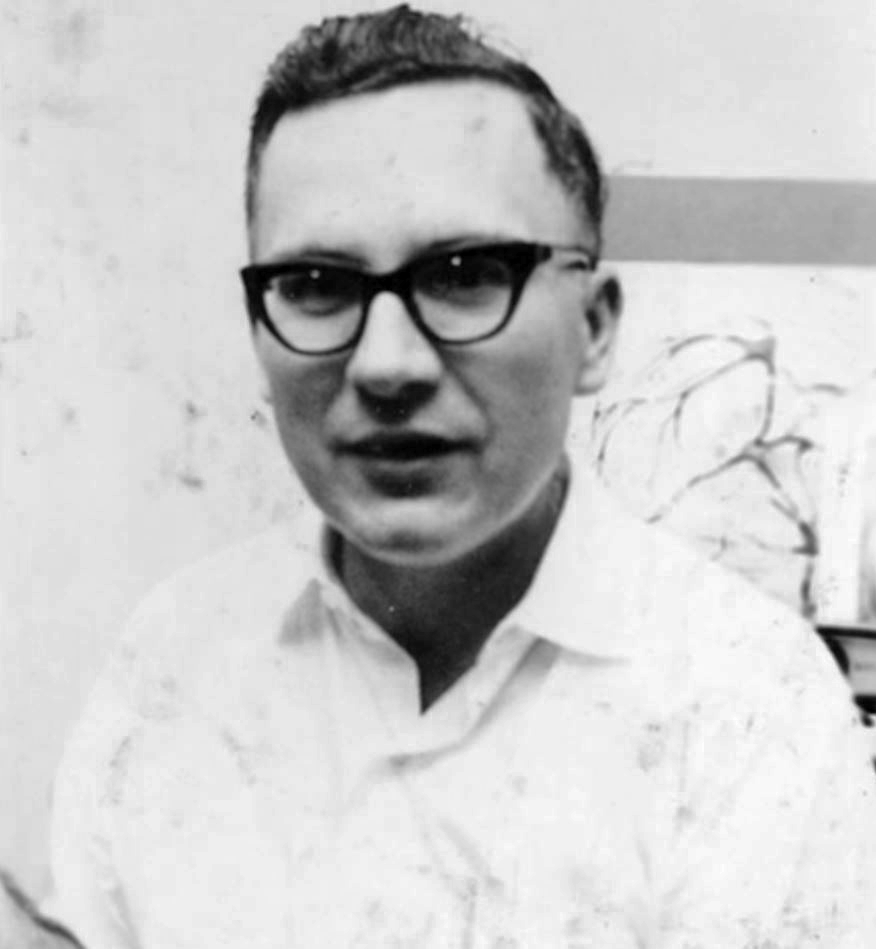
Albert K. Bender as a young man

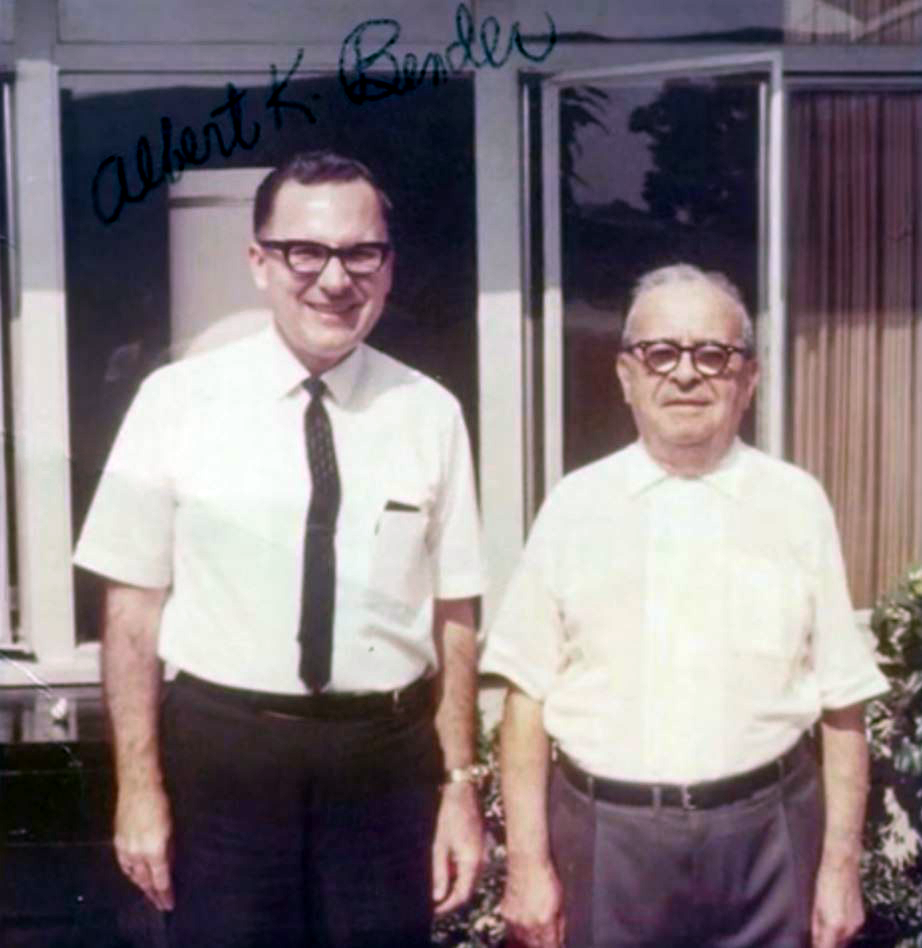
Albert K. Bender and Max Steiner, film music composer

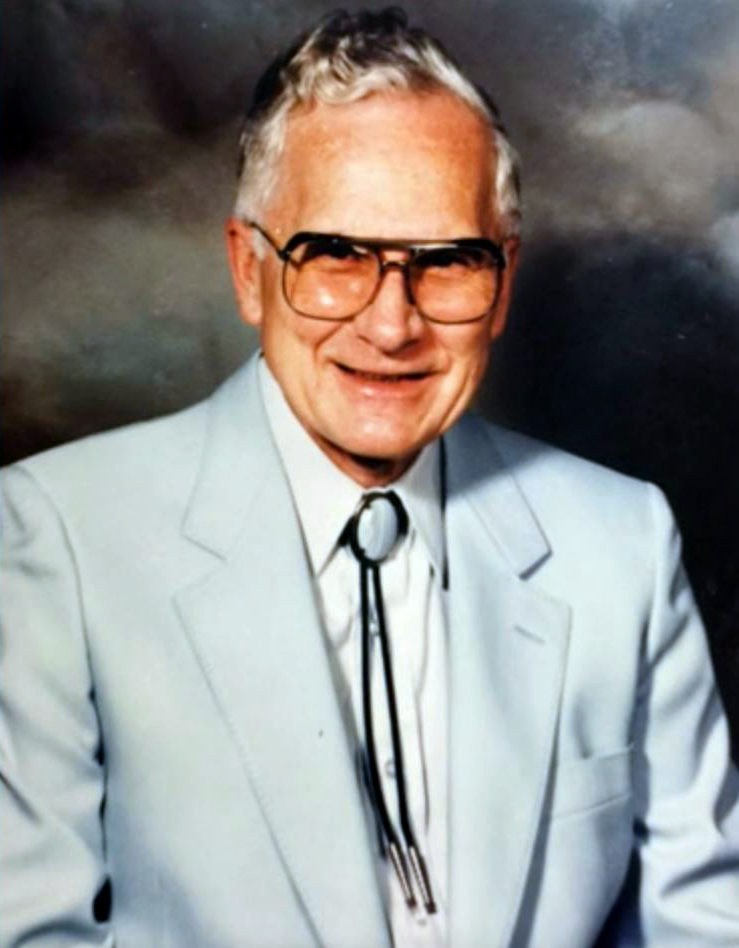
Albert K. Bender portrait

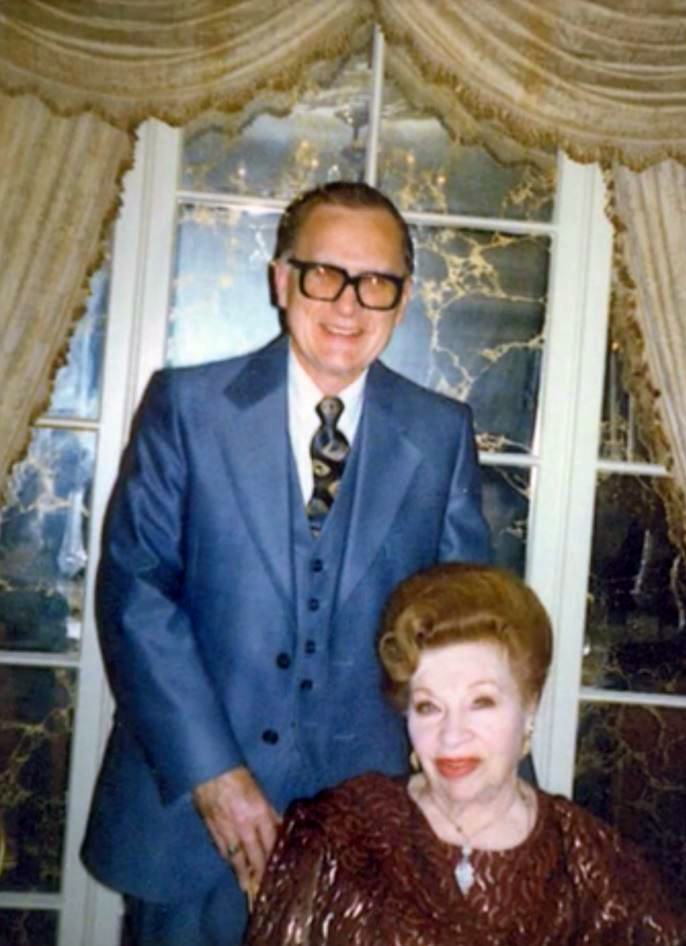
Albert K. Bender and Max Steiner's wife.

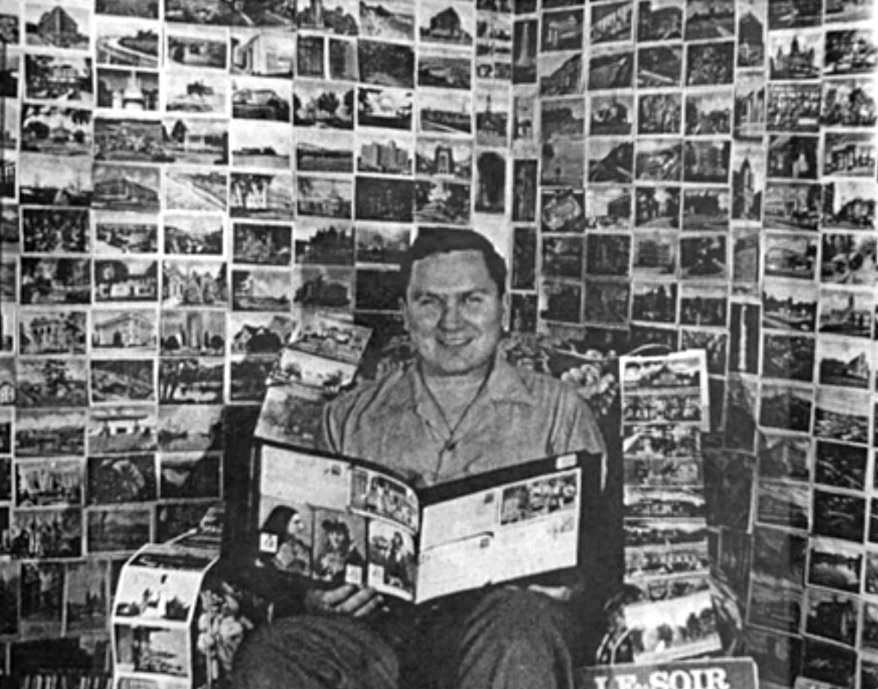
Albert K. Bender sitting on chair reading magazine

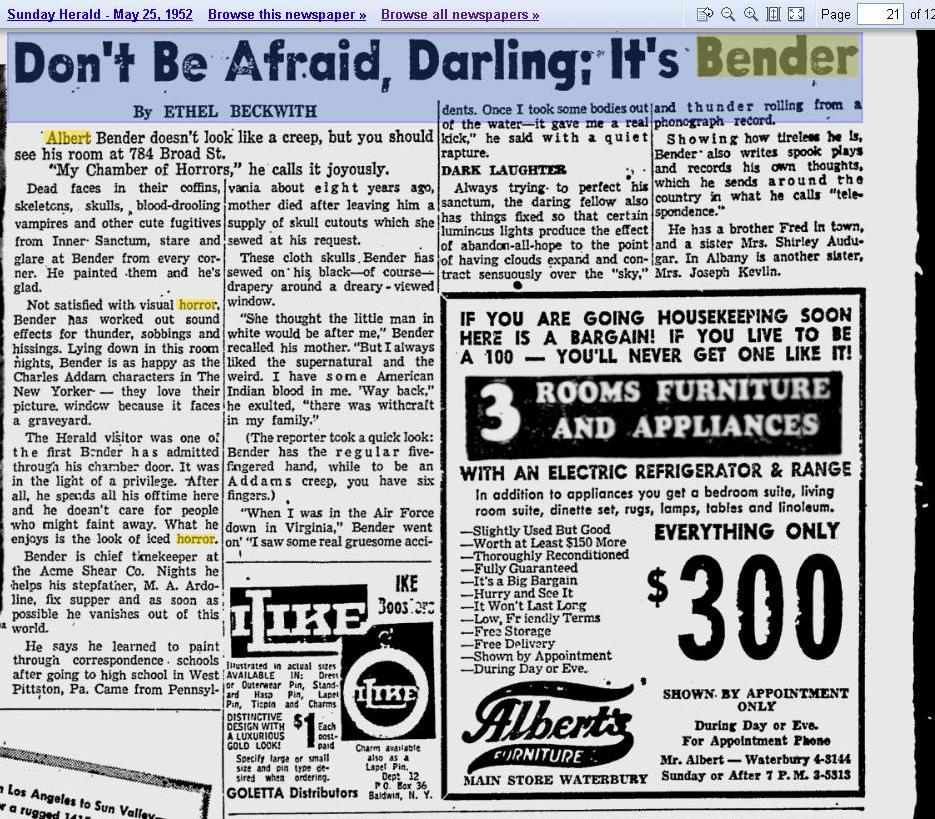
Newspaper article

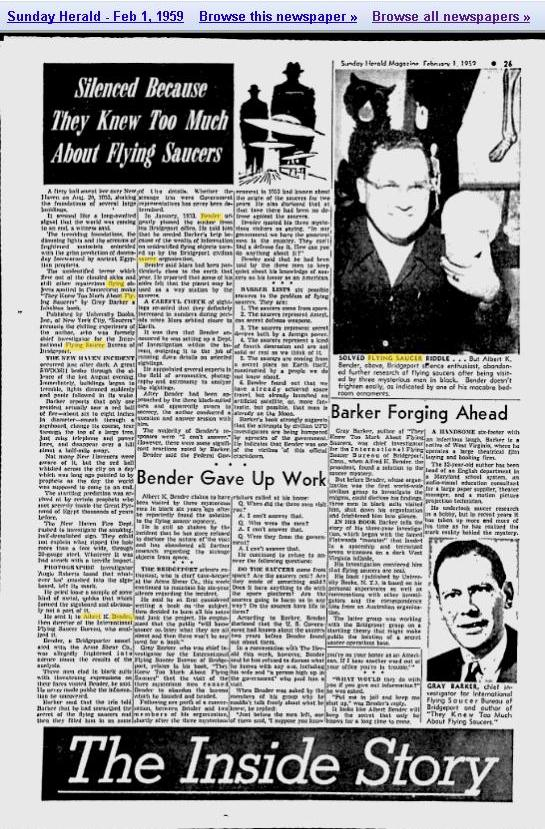
Newspaper article

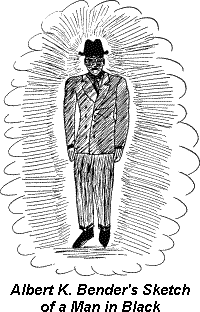
Sketch of men in black by Albert K. Bender

== See also ==
- Gray Barker
- Morris K. Jessup
