= Gray Barker =

American writer (1925–1984)

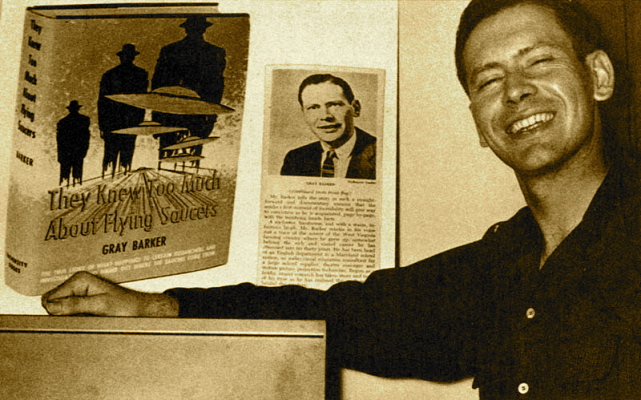
- Born: May 2, 1925; Riffle, West Virginia, U.S.
- Died: December 6, 1984 (aged 59)
- Education: Glenville State University
- Known for: They Knew Too Much About Flying Saucers

Gray Barker (May 2, 1925 – December 6, 1984) was an American writer best known for his books about UFOs and other paranormal phenomena. His 1956 book They Knew Too Much About Flying Saucers introduced the notion of the Men in Black to ufology. Recent evidence indicates that he was skeptical of most UFO claims, and mainly wrote about the subject for financial gain. He sometimes participated in hoaxes to deceive more serious UFO investigators.

== Life ==
A native of Riffle, Braxton County, West Virginia, Barker graduated from Glenville State College in 1947. In 1952, he was working as a theater booker in Clarksburg, West Virginia when he began collecting stories about the Flatwoods Monster, an alleged extraterrestrial reported by residents of nearby Braxton County. Barker submitted an article about the creature to FATE Magazine, and shortly afterwards began writing regular pieces about UFOs for Space Review, a magazine published by Albert K. Bender's International Flying Saucer Bureau.

In 1953, Albert K. Bender abruptly dissolved his organization, claiming that he could not continue writing about UFOs because of "orders from a higher source". After pressing Bender for more details, Barker wrote his first book, They Knew Too Much About Flying Saucers, which was published by University Books in 1956. The book was the first to describe the Men in Black, a group of mysterious figures who, according to UFO conspiracy theorists, intimidate individuals into keeping silent about UFOs. Barker recounted Bender's own alleged encounters with the Men in Black, who were said to travel in groups of three, wear black suits, and drive large black automobiles, usually Cadillacs. In 1962, Barker and Bender collaborated on a second book on the topic, called Flying Saucers and the Three Men. Published under Barker's own imprint, Saucerian Books, this book proposed that the Men in Black were, themselves, extraterrestrials.

Over the next two decades, Barker continued writing books about UFOs and other paranormal phenomena. One of these was 1970's The Silver Bridge, which linked the collapse of the Silver Bridge in Point Pleasant, West Virginia with the appearance of an alleged paranormal creature known as Mothman. The book preceded John Keel's The Mothman Prophecies by five years. Before dying in 1984, Barker wrote a final book about the Men in Black, called MIB: The Secret Terror Among Us.

As noted in Garrett Graff's 2023 study on UFOs and the U.S. government's involvement in studying them, Barker, who was homosexual, was sometimes the target of Coral Lorenzen's homophobic ire, who once quipped that "he wore too much lipstick" (Graff 2023, footnote on p. 119).

== Opinions on the paranormal ==
Though his books advocated the existence of UFOs and extraterrestrials, Barker was privately skeptical of the paranormal. His sister Blanch explained that Barker only wrote the books for the money, and his friend James W. Moseley said Barker "pretty much took all of UFOlogy as a joke". In a letter to John C. Sherwood, who had submitted materials to Saucerian Books as a teenager, Barker referred to his paranormal writings as his "kookie books".

Barker occasionally engaged in deliberate hoaxes to deceive UFO enthusiasts. In 1957, for example, Barker and Moseley wrote a fake letter (signed "R.E. Straith") to self-claimed UFO "contactee" George Adamski, telling Adamski that the United States Department of State was pleased with Adamski's research into UFOs. The letter was written on State Department stationery, and Barker himself described it as "one of the great unsolved mysteries of the UFO field" in his 1967 Book of Adamski.

According to Sherwood's Skeptical Inquirer article "Gray Barker: My Friend, the Myth-Maker", there may have been "a grain of truth" to Barker's writings on the Men in Black, in that the United States Air Force and other government agencies did attempt to discourage public interest in UFOs during the 1950s. However, Barker is thought to have greatly embellished the facts of the situation. In the same Skeptical Inquirer article, Sherwood revealed that, in the late 1960s, he and Barker collaborated on a brief fictional notice alluding to the Men in Black, which was published as fact first in Raymond A. Palmer's Flying Saucers magazine and some of Barker's own publications. In the story, Sherwood (writing as "Dr. Richard H. Pratt") claimed he was ordered to silence by the "blackmen" after learning that UFOs were time-travelling vehicles. Barker later wrote to Sherwood, "Evidently the fans swallowed this one with a gulp."

== Legacy ==
The concept of the Men in Black, which Barker introduced in They Knew Too Much About Flying Saucers, has become a major part of UFO lore. The book inspired a fictional comic book written by Lowell Cunningham, which in turn inspired a popular film and animated television series. Barker himself became the subject of two documentary films: Whispers From Space (1995), created by Ralph Coon and his zine, The Last Prom, and Shades of Gray (2008), directed by Bob Wilkinson.

In its Gray Barker Room at the Waldomore, the Clarksburg-Harrison Public Library in West Virginia holds a collection of Gray Barker's writings, as well as files of correspondence between Barker and notable figures of the UFO field from the 1950s to the early 1980s such as George Adamski, Howard Menger, James Moseley, and others. The room is a minor tourist stop for UFO enthusiasts.

== Works ==
- They Knew Too Much About Flying Saucers (1956). University Books.
