= 1967 British flying saucer hoax =

UFO hoax

The 1967 British flying saucer hoax was originally thought to be the landing of six mysterious "spaceships" that occurred across Southern England on Monday, 4 September 1967.

A major police and army response followed the discovery of the "spacecraft", which were 54 inches (1.4 m) long, 30 inches (0.76 m) wide and 20 inches (0.51 m) deep, weighed 100 pounds (45 kg) and emitted an electronic noise. The six craft were located along the 51st line of latitude from the Thames Estuary to the Bristol Channel, roughly equidistant from each other: at a new housing estate near Queenborough on the Isle of Sheppey, Bromley golf course in south London, a horse paddock in Winkfield village (near Ascot), the village of Welford (near Newbury), in Berkshire, Chippenham in Wiltshire and on Dial Hill in Clevedon in Somerset.

The hoax was undertaken by aircraft engineering apprentices from the Royal Aircraft Establishment (RAE) at Farnborough.

== Planning and building the "spacecraft" ==
The hoax had been planned in January 1967 to be part of RAE Farnborough Apprentices' upcoming Rag Week. The apprentices moulded the half-shells of their flying saucers in glass-fibre-reinforced polyester resin (fibreglass), with an aluminium-powder-impregnated gel-coat (outside surface). Once joined and polished, the shells appeared to be a smooth, solid form of dull aluminium with no joints, holes or protrusions. Prior to joining the half-shells, the (then) lower half of each saucer was part-filled with a smelly fermenting flour and water paste. An electronic oscillator with loudspeaker was installed in the upper blister, to make eerie sounds when the saucer was moved or flipped over.

In small groups, the Rag Committee drove to preselected locations in the dead of night to place the saucers on open ground with good public access. The 'drop' positions were evenly spaced, close to the line of 51.5 degrees latitude, roughly between the Thames estuary and Bristol Channel. One member of each delivery party had a plausible reason for being in the area, should they be challenged. Some of the saucers were left silent, and others flipped over causing them to emit 'disturbing' electronic sound. At the time, none of the perpetrators were challenged or identified.

== Response from the authorities ==
When each of the saucers was later reported to the police, they were cordoned off. The British Army's southern command, several police forces, army bomb disposal units, and RAF helicopters were mobilised. The Ministry of Defence was informed and the army blew up the saucer found at Chippenham. The one on the Isle of Sheppey was removed by helicopter. Another was sent to the Atomic Weapons Establishment at Aldermaston and one to the guided weapons division of the British Aircraft Corporation. When one of the saucers was drilled into, the mixture inside exploded, covering police officers in foul-smelling slime.

== Revealing the hoax ==
The masterminds were Christopher Southall and Roger Palmer, both aged 21. The motive for the hoax was to gain publicity for the RAE Apprentices' Rag Week, to boost fundraising. The hoax received extensive media attention, in Britain and abroad. The apprentices did not think the hoax would create such a media storm but several were later interviewed on television. They revealed the hoax the same day as the saucers were found. No action was taken against the hoaxers, and they raised £2,000 for charity.
