= Time-traveler UFO hypothesis =

Concept developed by Ufologists

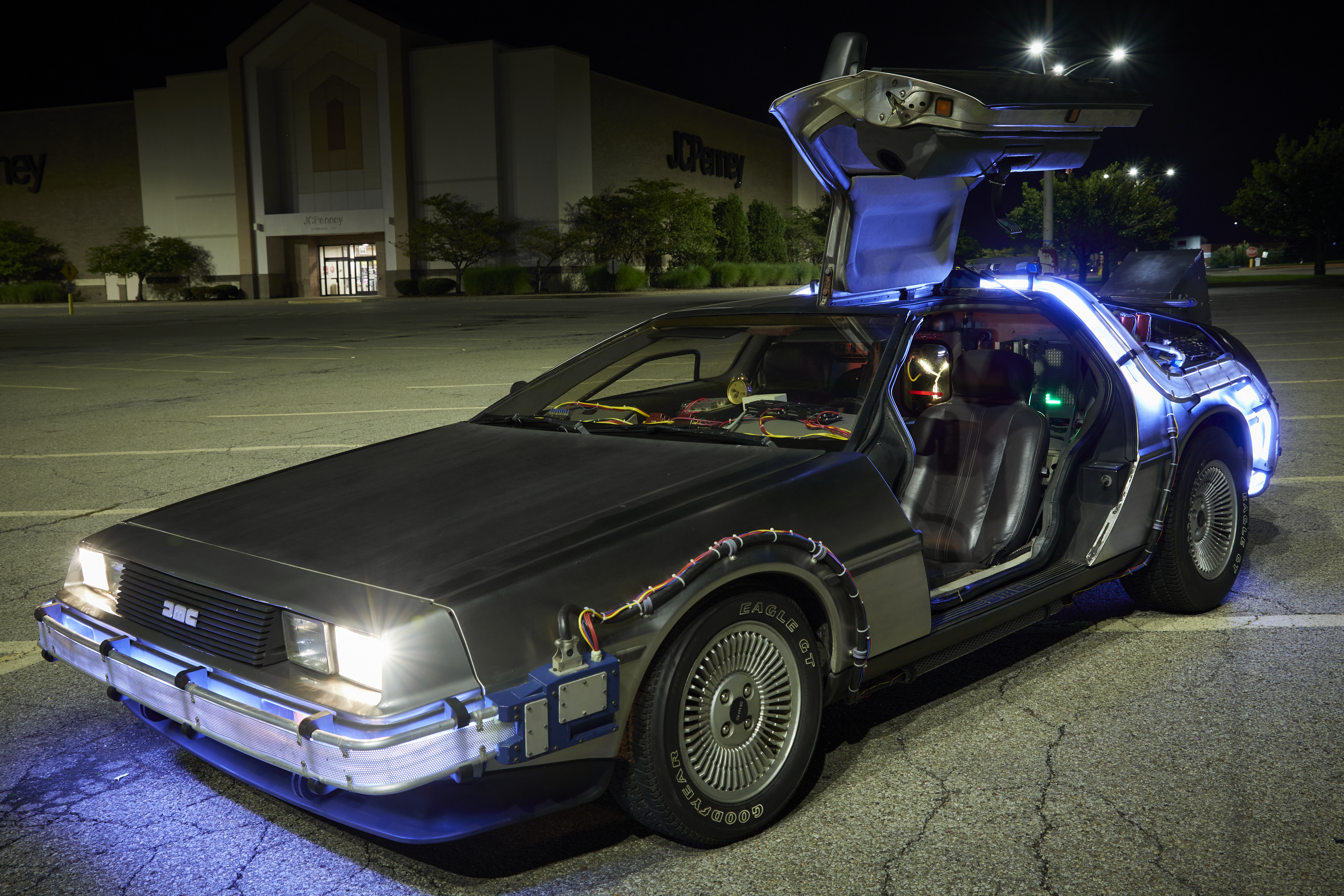
In the film Back to the Future, a time traveller in a Delorean is mistaken for an alien.

The time-traveler hypothesis, also known as chrononaut UFO, future humans, extratempestrial model, and Terminator theory, is the proposal that unidentified flying objects are humans traveling from the future using advanced technology. Some notable people have given recent public exposure to the hypothesis, such as retired NASA aerospace engineer Larry Lemke, Wisconsin congressman Mike Gallagher, and American filmmaker Steven Spielberg.

The time-traveler hypothesis is considered extremely implausible by mainstream scholars, and it has historically only been endorsed by a minority of the UFO researchers who argue on behalf of non-prosaic explanations for the purported phenomena.

== Antecedents ==
=== Origins of time travel speculation ===
The notion of time travel from the future to the past is thought to have been introduced for the first time in literature by French botanist and geologist Pierre Boitard in his popular 1861 book Paris avant les hommes ("Paris Before Men"), featuring a man sent back to prehistoric Earth where he interacts with an ape-like ancestor. A few years later, in 1887, Camille Flammarion published Lumen, a novel featuring an alien soul traveling through different worlds and historical periods.

Although traveling back in time is almost universally considered physically impossible, theoretical research has explored whether it might be possible. It has also been speculated by scientists such as J. Richard Gott, Ronald Mallet, and others that humans may someday be able to time travel to the past.

=== Speculation of future human evolution ===
Many authors and researchers have speculated about the future evolution of humankind. In 1888, English author H. G. Wells published his famous science-fiction novella The Time Machine featuring a future evolution of humans, which is generally regarded as one of the first modern instances of both time travel and speculative evolution. Other writers on speculative evolution include Edgar Rice Burroughs, British philosopher and science fiction writer Olaf Stapledon with his 1930 "future history" novel Last and First Men, American author Kurt Vonnegut in Galápagos, British writer Stephen Baxter in Evolution, Turkish artist and author Cevdet Mehmet Kösemen in All Tomorrows, among others. Climate change, the technological singularity, space travel, and genetic enhancement have also been identified as potential factors capable of altering the evolution of humans in the future, leading to different transhuman and posthuman scenarios.

=== UFOs and initial explanations ===
Human beings have reported unknown objects in the skies since antiquity. In the 1890s, a wave of mystery airship sightings was reported throughout the US, followed decades later by foo fighters during World War II and ghost rockets in the Nordic countries shortly thereafter.

The modern UFO era began in the summer of 1947, days after the United States announced plans to re-industrialize Germany over strenuous Soviet objection, sparking the Cold War. Amid fears of a Soviet response, civilian pilot Kenneth Arnold reported witnessing a formation of supersonic aircraft. Wartime prohibition of live "man on the street" broadcasts having ended, Arnold's sighting was covered nationwide on radio and in print media. In the days and weeks following the Arnold sighting, a nationwide craze swept the United States as over 800 similar sightings were published in the English-speaking press. Contemporary sources hypothesized that the sightings resulted from novel US or Soviet technology, misidentification of mundane objects, or behavioral effects like mass hysteria; while more speculative sources suggested that the sightings were a sign of the end of the world, were angelic or demonic, or were vehicles carrying people from other planets or other "dimensions".

== Formation and spread ==
=== Implausibility of humanoid aliens ===
Contactee and alien abduction folklore often describe encounters with human or humanoid figures and abductors. In his 1964 article The Nonprevalence of Humanoids George Gaylord Simpson claimed that it is extremely unlikely that there exists any form of extraterrestrial intelligence in the Solar System or elsewhere and that, even if they did exist, it was even more unlikely that they would be humanoids. His article was cited and analysed, alongside evolutionary biologist Theodosius Dobzhansky’s similar view on the implausibility of the evolution of humanoid extraterrestrial life forms, in the famous 2014 collection of essays Archaeology, Anthropology and Interstellar Communication edited by astrobiologist Douglas Vakoch and published by NASA in 2014. In the late 1980s, evolutionary biologist and historian of science Stephen Jay Gould put forth his famous thought experiment that if evolution was rewound and played back again it would likely take a very different course and humans would never evolve, which, in addition to his declared view against human-oriented evolutionary teleonomy, helped shape the established view that if intelligent extraterrestrials did exist, they would likely not resemble humans. In their book Evolving the Alien, biologist Jack Cohen and mathematician Ian Stewart assumed a similar position about the iconic representation of the Grey alien from reports of UFO abduction and close encounters, stating that extraterrestrials from an alien world could not have evolved along so similar a vector as humans.

=== Modern popularization ===
"UFO reports are not necessarily caused by visits from space travelers... If time and space are not as simple in structure as physicists have assumed until now, then the question ‘where do they come from?’ may be meaningless: they could come from a place in time."

— Jacques Vallée, The Invisible College, p. 29 – 1975

It is unclear exactly when the hypothesis in its complete form was first proposed. Early versions surfaced between speculative UFO literature of the 1970s and the nascent internet culture of the 1990s, at times associated with the idioms "chrononaut UFOs", "time traveling humans", or simply "future humans". Examples include contributions by Jacques Vallée in his book The Invisible College, Radford University anthropology professor and former Forbes contributor David S. Anderson, Jenny Randles' 2001 book Time Storms, James Herbert Brennan's 1997 book Time Travel: A New Perspective, which also draws parallels between the time travelers and elements of the pseudoarchaeological notion of ancient astronauts and ooparts, as well as many others. In their 1998 book The Day After Roswell, U.S. Army officer Philip J. Corso and American novelist William J. Birnes reported that German physicist and engineer Hermann Oberth believed the craft recovered at Roswell could have been a time machine.

On 27 April 2012, History aired the "Time Travelers" episode from season four of the series Ancient Aliens, produced by Prometheus Entertainment and available on Netflix since 2022. In the same year, the "Time Benders" episode from season 18 of the same series aired on History, exploring other aspects of the concept and featuring more speakers, including American professor of biological anthropology Michael P. Masters from the Montana Technological University in Butte, Montana, and British journalist and Ministry of Defence civil servant Nick Pope. Pope linked the Rendlesham Forest incident in the UK and the Cabo Valdés Case in Chile with the time-traveler hypothesis, a connection he also explored in his 2014 book (written with John Burroughs, USAF, Ret., and Jim Penniston, USAF, Ret.) Encounter in Rendlesham Forest: The Inside Story of the World's Best-Documented UFO Incident, published by St. Martin's Press. The two episodes feature, among others, ufologists Giorgio A. Tsoukalos, Sean David Morton, authors Erich von Däniken, David Hatcher Childress, Philip Coppens, and theoretical physicist Ronald L. Mallett, discussing the time-traveler hypothesis in the contexts of pseudoarchaeology and pseudohistory.

In 2013, the Huffington Post published an article describing the time-traveler hypothesis and often referencing the Ancient Aliens episode. In the article, the author also reports an online conspiracy theory about how U.S. Navy Commander George W. Hoover allegedly revealed to his son, George Hoover Jr. and later to ufologist William J. Birnes, that the Roswell incident may have involved human beings from the future rather than aliens and that he believed those "beings" were not extraterrestrial, but rather "extratemporal" in nature. The article goes on to link Hoover's story to other alleged UFO sightings and UFO abduction accounts with similar statements and reports about aliens actually being "humans of the future who have found the technology to overcome the limitations of light speed and time travel paradoxes that keep present-day humans from breaching the boundaries of time" and that their "often-humanoid appearance may suggest a link between the way we look today, and what we might look like thousands of years from now."

In his 2019 book Identified Flying Objects and subsequent 2022 volume The Extratempestrial Model, Michael P. Masters explored various aspects of the time-traveler hypothesis, including fringe ancient astronauts theories alongside speculative evolution scenarios such as brain growth, craniofacial evolution, bipedalism, paedomorphism, and more. Masters was featured on various prominent shows to discuss his contributions to the hypothesis including, amongst others, Reality Check with Ross Coulthart on News Nation, The Cryptid Factor co-hosted by New Zealand journalist David Farrier, comedian Rhys Darby, producers Dan Schreiber and Leon Kirkbeck,, Sean Patrick Hazlett's Through the Glass Darkly, and The Joe Rogan Experience. In the same year, TNW also published an article about Masters' extratempestrial model.

In his 2021 book Closer Encounters, philosopher Jason Reza Jorjani argued that UFOs could be time machines whose occupants are human time travelers, potentially originating in the human future. He specifically identified the reported Nordic occupants of UFOs as human time travelers rather than extraterrestrials. In June 2022, British ESA astronaut Tim Peake mentioned the time-traveler hypothesis in an interview on Good Morning Britain. In a 2023 interview with Stephen Colbert from The Late Show, American filmmaker Steven Spielberg also mentions the theory.

A number of motives for the alleged time travelers are put forth in the different media where the hypothesis is discussed, such as historical or paleoanthropological interest to study our own past, as well as tourism.

=== Terminology and connection to other theories ===
Although in his books and publications Masters uses the neologism "extratempestrial" to describe his model and the alleged beings piloting the UFOs, the overall idea has been dubbed the "time-traveler hypothesis" by executive director of nonprofit Mutual UFO Network (MUFON), Jan Harzan.

The time-traveler hypothesis and the interdimensional hypothesis overlap to a certain extent. Figures in the ufology community, such as former MUFON director for the state of Pennsylvania John Ventre in an interview with KDKA News Radio, as well as American parapsychologist and engineer Harold E. Puthoff, refer to the two interchangeably. Masters has stated that he considers his extratempestrial model a subcategory of the interdimensional hypothesis. Indeed, from a more scientific standpoint – albeit controversially – within the framework of the many-worlds interpretation of quantum mechanics, temporal paradoxes could be avoided if the time traveler were to move from one dimension, or parallel universe, or timeline, to another.

In a similar manner to how the extraterrestrial hypothesis represents a potential solution to Fermi's paradox, the time-traveler hypothesis provides an alternative explanation for the absence of future time travelers. In an interview with Nova on PBS, astrophysicist and skeptic Carl Sagan said that there is a possibility that time travelers from the future are already here and we simply do not have the means or the knowledge to recognize them as such, or have other names for them, such as "UFOs or ghosts or hobgoblins or fairies" and that he did not think "that the fact that we're not obviously being visited by time travelers shows that time travel is impossible."

== Forward time travel ==
An inverse variation of the time-traveler hypothesis proposes that UFOs could originate in the distant past and arrive in the present through forward rather than backward time travel. In December 2025, American technology entrepreneur Palmer Luckey, founder of Oculus VR and co-founder of the defense technology company Anduril Industries, discussed this as his "current working theory", albeit speculative, in an interview with Molly O'Shea for Sourcery. However, the general concept and its underlying physical mechanism predate Luckey's remarks by several decades. In 1963, Sagan examined how relativistic interstellar travel could allow extraterrestrial travelers to cross galactic distances within comparatively short shipboard lifetimes while much longer periods elapsed externally (due to time dilation and length contraction), and also considered the possibility of extraterrestrial visits to Earth. In 1956, writer Alex Saunders had already asked whether flying saucers could be "time-travelers" and proposed that their occupants might experience time at a different rate from humans, so that centuries could elapse on Earth during a much shorter interval for the travelers. Richard E. Mooney's 1975 book Gods of Air and Darkness similarly interpreted traditions concerning ancient "space-travelling gods" through relativistic time dilation, suggesting that the same travelers could make visits separated by centuries in terrestrial time. In 1979, Rick Lawer explicitly connected the same mechanism with both UFOs and ancient-astronaut theories in his article "Answers to Time and Space" in UFO Update!, arguing that relativistic time dilation could permit an advanced civilization to travel across the galaxy while experiencing far less time than would have elapsed elsewhere. An even more explicit formulation appeared in 1981, when Australian UFO researchers Holly Goriss and John Prytz considered "terrestrial super-civilizations" from the past traveling into "the future (our present)" as an explanation for UFO reports, with the craft functioning as time machines and their occupants as time travelers; the authors ultimately rejected the hypothesis as unnecessarily contrived. The possibility was also presented in popular television before Luckey's remarks, including the 2022 Ancient Aliens episode "The Time Benders", which considered whether purported visitors might originate not only from the future but also from the distant past.

== Criticism ==
Due to the theoretical contradictions inherent to retrocausality regarding closed timelike curves, researcher Andrew Knight has labeled retrograde time travel as "pseudoscientific", and the time-traveler hypothesis itself has been challenged by skeptics. American astrophysicist Neil deGrasse Tyson has referred to the hypothesis as illogical. UFO skeptic Robert Sheaffer criticized Masters' work because it relies on "the belief that time travel is not only possible, but real."

British astronomer and science writer David J. Darling has stated that the extraterrestrial hypothesis and the time-travel hypothesis are equally reasonable yet highly unlikely and unnecessary and that, although certain aerial phenomena have indeed eluded identification, there is no apparent reason to justify the claim that they're artificial and/or not of this world. Furthermore, he added that:

... if some UFOs are 'alien' craft, it's just as reasonable to suppose that they might be time machines from our own future than that they're spacecraft from other stars. The problem is the 'if.' ... Outside of the popular mythos of flying saucers and archetypal, big-brained aliens, there's precious little credible evidence that they exist. So, my issue with [Masters'] book is not the ingenuity of its thesis, but the fact that there's really no need for such a thesis in the first place.

Referring to the Rendlesham incident, science writer and UFO skeptic Ian Ridpath wrote that time-traveling UFO allegations from retired sergeant Jim Penniston's hypnosis session may have been influenced by him watching the sci-fi film Official Denial (which aired in 1993 and was released on video in May 1994, a few months before Penniston's claim surfaced in September of the same year), suggesting a life imitates art situation, with the film causing Penniston's ostensible false memory.

In February 2022, American futurist and science communicator Isaac Arthur discussed the odds against the time-traveler hypothesis on episode 23 Are Aliens Just Time Traveling Humans of the podcast It's Probably (not) Aliens, specifically aiming to debunk the concept as it was presented on the episode "Time Travel" of the series Ancient Aliens.

When asked about the plausibility of UFOs being future humans, Queensland University quantum physicist Fabio Costa told Popular Mechanics:

In a sense, traveling back in time requires two doors, one in the future and one in the past. You can only travel back if someone has opened the door to the past. So, people from the future cannot visit us ... unless someone has already invented a time machine and nobody knows! ... That leaves open the question: where is the time machine?

== In popular culture ==
The 1966 Sherwood Schwartz TV series It's About Time portrays 20th-century astronauts being sent back to the Stone Age after traveling around the earth faster than the speed of light. The astronauts have to contend with the suspicions and superstitions of local cave-dwellers, who regard their advanced technology as sorcery. The astronauts eventually repair their space capsule and return to 1967 with the prehistoric family they befriended. Similar plots were involved in Lost in Space's episode "Visit to a Hostile Planet" (1967), Star Trek episodes "Tomorrow Is Yesterday" (1969) and "Little Green Men" (1995) from the Deep Space Nine series, as well as Futurama's "Roswell That Ends Well" (2001).

In Gregory Benford's 1980 novel Timescape, scientist Saul Shriffer, a colleague of Frank Drake at the SETI Project Ozma, believes that a cryptic signal is of extraterrestrial origin, when in fact it had been sent thirty-four years into the past by humans of the future.

In Larry Niven's 1980 short story "The Green Marauder", first published in Destinies, an extraterrestrial traveler originating from almost two billion years in the past has not significantly aged as a result of relativistic spaceflight, and she recounts an earlier visit to prehistoric Earth over 700 million years prior, at a time when the planet was inhabited by an advanced anaerobic civilization. Because the traveler experiences far less elapsed time than passes externally, the story presents a fictional example of a visitor from Earth's distant past reaching a much later era through relativistic time dilation.

In his 1984 science fiction/fantasy novel Birds of Prey, American author David Drake describes six sterile and mutually telepathic sisters who time travel back in time to save humanity from an intelligent but monstrous alien species similar to social insects. The plot suggests that in the future humanity evolves to be quite different from its present form and that the six sisters, along with many other future humans, had become more similar to the insectoid aliens, somewhat of a hybrid between hominids and worker ants or bees, in their attempt to fight them for survival.

In Back to the Future (1985), the Peabody family mistakes Marty McFly’s DeLorean time machine, newly arrived in 1955, for a flying saucer and Marty for an extraterrestrial because of his radiation suit. The scene presents a time-travel vehicle being interpreted by contemporary witnesses as a UFO.

In Michael Crichton's 1987 novel Sphere (and subsequent film adaptation of the same name), what was thought to be an alien craft at the bottom of the Pacific Ocean turns out to be a ship built by humans from the future.

In 1993, Syfy (at the time the "Sci-Fi Channel") produced their first original TV film, Official Denial, directed by Brian Trenchard-Smith and written by Bryce Zabel, in which a man named Paul Corliss, played by Parker Stevenson, is abducted by aliens who are revealed to be humans from the future at the end of the movie.

In the fifteenth comic book of the Belgian series Blake and Mortimer, The Strange Encounter (2001), British physicist Philip Mortimer and Dr. Walt Kaufman from SUFOS (Section of UFO Studies) investigate the sudden appearance of the corpse of Major Lachlan Macquarrie, a British officer who had disappeared during the Battle of Saratoga in 1777 after the appearance of three mysterious lights and reappeared in the present under the same circumstances, wearing a baldric inscribed with the words "Yellow King, 8061, Danger, Light, Plutonian, H, Poplar trees, Temple 1954". The same night of the autopsy, Mortimer fights an intruder wearing identical 18th century clothes and anachronistic items as Macquarrie. In the clash, the intruder falls and dies, revealing alienlike features under a human suit. Based on the mysterious clue found on Major Macquarrie, they hypothesize that the alien could be from Pluto, only to instantly realize that his physiology is unsuitable to survive the planet's harsh environment. Later, the alien scientist Dr. Z'ong reveals to Mortimer that commander Basam Damdu, absolute dictator of the Yellow Empire from The Secret of the Swordfish, along with his army, including Zong himself, are humans from 8061, a time when the earth is deserted due to a long nuclear war in the 21st century and humans are an endangered species with alienlike deformities. Some of these plot elements are reminiscent of another earlier episode, The Time Trap, where similar events, such as a post-nuclear dystopian Earth and a rising world order led by a tyrant, take place in the 51st century, in the year 5060.

The English progressive rock band Yes wrote a song titled "Aliens (Are Only Us from the Future)" entirely dedicated to the subject. The track had been performed during Yes's In the Present world tour, but was never released, until the band's bassist Chris Squire decided to finally publish it in 2012 together with English rock band Genesis’s guitarist Steve Hackett and Travis singer Fran Healy as co-writer, calling it simply "Aliens", on their only studio album, A Life Within a Day.

Jordan Peele's 2022 horror movie Nope references "futuristic humans coming back in time to stop us from destroying the planet".

The 2014 movie Interstellar contains deus ex machina beings who built the tesseract environment inside the supermassive black hole Gargantua and possibly placed the wormhole near Saturn that would lead the crew of the Endurance to three potentially habitable exoplanets. These "superior" entities – called bulk-beings by American physicist Kip Thorne in The Science of Interstellar, and referred to by the characters of the movie as "they" – are later revealed by the protagonist Cooper to be humans from the future who evolved to exist in five dimensions, guiding him and his daughter Murph through the necessary steps to crack the equation of quantum gravity and save humanity.

== See also ==
- Time travel
- Posthumanism
- Transhumanism
- Timeline of the far future
- Longtermism
- Speculative Evolution

Other hypotheses:

- Cryptoterrestrial hypothesis
- Interdimensional hypothesis
- Thanatological UFO hypothesis
- Space animal hypothesis
- Demonic UFO hypothesis
- Psychosocial hypothesis
