= Thanatological UFO hypothesis =

Interpretation proposing that some UFOs are linked to death and the afterlife

The thanatological UFO hypothesis is a proposal within ufology, the paranormal and the supernatural, which holds that some unidentified flying objects (UFOs) and associated entities may be linked to death, the dead, afterlife, and near-death experiences. Proponents, including Whitley Strieber (often with Jeffrey J. Kripal), and, more systematically, Joshua Cutchin, argue that recurring motifs in UFO reports—apparitional presences, liminality, soul-journey symbolism, and overlaps with near-death experiences (NDEs)—are better explained by a "death-adjacent" or survival-of-consciousness model than by a purely extraterrestrial or psychosocial account. Thanatological interpretations of UFOs have generally remained marginal within both ufology and mainstream scholarship, with critics highlighting their speculative and unfalsifiable elements.

== Overview ==
In this interpretation, some UFOs and their occupants are read not as extraterrestrial spacecraft but as apparitional or liminal phenomena connected with death and post-mortem states. American author Whitley Strieber has publicly linked his “visitors” to “life after death,” a theme further articulated together with Rice University religious scholar Jeffrey Kripal in The Super Natural (2016) and reiterated in several academic interviews; Kripal explicitly frames aspects of the UFO mythos as religious/thanatological.

Tuba player and author of the paranormal Joshua Cutchin’s two-volume Ecology of Souls (2022) advances a detailed comparative case that “paranormal entities of all different kinds are conceived as psychopomps... ushering souls in their transition to the other side.” The psychopomp framing overlaps with non-extraterrestrial models such as the ultraterrestrial (John Keel), interdimensional (Jacques Vallée), and psychosocial approaches inspired by Jung. Specifically, the psychopomp hypothesis (from Greek psychē “soul” + pompos “guide”) proposes that at least some UFOs may be functioning analogously to "guides of souls". Within the UFO context, this stems from the proposal that nonhuman intelligences may act as liminal or intermediary agents rather than space-traveling aliens.

== Historical background ==
In 1758 Emanuel Swedenborg wrote in his De Telluribus in Mundo nostro Solari that he was in telepathic contact with extraterrestrial spirits in the afterlife.

Early psychological–religious readings of the UFO wave include Carl Gustav Jung’s Flying Saucers: A Modern Myth of Things Seen in the Skies (1958/59), which treated UFOs as numinous symbols arising at moments of cultural crisis. While not directly proposing a psychopomp role, Jung’s approach seeded non-ET interpretations tying the phenomenon to death, wholeness, and salvation imagery. In relation to a dream he psychoanalyzed, he stated:

The idea that the Ufo might be a sort of Charon is certainly one that I have not met in the literature so far.

In The Dragon and the Disc (1973), Frederick W. Holiday entertains the idea that flying discs and cigar-shaped UFOs could have some psychopompic functions, drawing parallels with Odin as Valfǫðr (Father of the Slain) - leader of souls and Lord of Valhalla - to which the Valkyrie would take those died in the battlefield.

American novelist Anne Strieber later recalled that, after reading large numbers of letters sent to her husband in response to the publication of his book Communion, the point she remembered most clearly was: "they have something to do with what we call death", referring to UFOs.

In 2024, Harvard Divinity School’s Center for the Study of World Religions featured Whitley Strieber in a long-form interview about “aliens, eros, and life after death,” reflecting the topic’s visibility in public-facing scholarship.

== Comparative religion, folklore, and thanatology ==
Religious-studies scholarship has examined UFO belief and experience as a modern religious formation.

Some scholars and commentators have interpreted alien abduction narratives as modern analogues of katabasis and anabasis, arguing that they reproduce older patterns of removal from ordinary space, entry into a liminal or otherworldly realm, encounter with nonhuman beings, ordeal or revelation, and return marked by trauma or transformation. Folklorist Thomas E. Bullard argued that abduction accounts “share many motifs with legends of supernatural encounters and otherworldly journeys” and that they update older supernatural kidnap traditions in technological form. American psychiatrist John E. Mack and psychologist Kenneth Ring drew further parallels between abduction narratives, near-death experiences, and death-and-rebirth motifs, with Ring in particular arguing for significant phenomenological overlap between UFO encounters and experiences traditionally associated with the afterlife. In his The Omega Project (1992) Ring compared near-death experiences with UFO abduction narratives, arguing for overlaps in phenomenology (out-of-body states, life review motifs, transformative aftereffects). Although contested, this work is frequently cited by writers proposing thanatological interpretations of UFO encounters. David J. Halperin has treated UFOs as mythic figures entangled with death and visionary journeying, while Jeffrey J. Kripal has described the UFO phenomenon in explicitly eschatological terms and vice versa the soul as a UFO. Religious scholar and author Diana Walsh Pasulka writes that her research on Catholic purgatory traditions uncovered reports of “orbs of light,” “flames that penetrated walls,” “luminous beings,” “forms of conscious light,” “spinning suns,” and “disc-like aerial objects,” and asks whether orbs “once interpreted as souls from purgatory” are now being interpreted as UFOs.

Cutchin systematizes psychopomp parallels across global folklore—faeries, death-omens, shamanic soul-flight—and modern reports, explicitly proposing that both entities and vehicles (including UFOs) can be read as psychopompic “conveyances.”

== Reincarnation and alien-abduction narratives ==
Harvard University psychiatrist John E. Mack reported an overlap between alien-abduction narratives and experiences interpreted as memories of previous lives. In discussing his research in 1993, Mack stated that some abductees described earlier embodiments and cycles of birth and death, and that he had guided several subjects through reported deaths in previous lifetimes; he also described cases in which experiencers perceived themselves as possessing both human and alien identities, with the latter sometimes experienced as a form of “soul self”, and that the alien beings were sometimes perceived as intermediaries or long-term spiritual presences. Much of this material, however, emerged during hypnotic regression, a methodology whose reliability for recovering purported past-life memories has been disputed. Reincarnation researcher Ian Stevenson cautioned that hypnosis can produce highly convincing but imaginary “previous personalities” whose characteristics may be influenced by suggestion or derived from normally acquired information whose source has been forgotten. Stevenson consequently distinguished hypnotic regression from his own methodology, which relied primarily on spontaneous past-life statements made by young children rather than memories elicited under hypnosis.

== Influence of Terence McKenna ==
Cutchin drew the title of his book Ecology of Souls from a statement by ethnobotanist and writer Terence McKenna concerning the visionary beings reported in DMT experiences. McKenna speculated that such entities might not be "extraterrestrials from Zubenelgenubi or Zeta Reticuli", but “the dear departed,” describing the DMT realm as “a nearby dimension teeming with intelligence” and “an ecology of souls.” In Cutchin’s usage, the phrase frames UFO entities and other paranormal beings within a broader comparative model involving the dead, shamanic soul flight, altered states, and psychopompic traditions.

== Neuroscientific and neurochemical parallels ==
Research has identified phenomenological and neurobiological parallels between some reported alien abduction experiences, NDEs, out-of-body experiences (OBEs), and psychedelic entity encounters. A 2026 review by psychologist Pascal Michael proposed that such experiences may involve partially overlapping mechanisms, including sleep paralysis, REM intrusion, altered temporoparietal processing, serotonergic activity, threat responses, and predictive processing, while emphasizing that the evidence remains limited and that important differences between these phenomena persist. Neuroscientific models of NDEs similarly implicate processes such as hypoxia, hypercapnia, altered temporoparietal activity, and changes in several neurotransmitter systems, some of which can produce disembodiment, sensed presences, mystical experiences, and apparently autonomous entities.

Michael further proposed that alien-abduction experiences may partly involve thanatosis (death-feigning or tonic immobility), drawing on research suggesting that NDEs may have evolutionary roots in this defensive response and noting parallels among thanatosis, NDEs, sleep paralysis, and the paralysis and threatening entity encounters reported in some abduction experiences.

Particular attention has been given to DMT, as controlled studies have found substantial phenomenological overlap between DMT experiences and NDEs, including sensations of entering another realm and encountering apparently sentient beings. However, although animal studies have found endogenous DMT production and increased concentrations after experimentally induced cardiac arrest, comparable release in dying humans and its significance for NDEs or UFO-related experiences have not been established.

== Reception and criticism ==
Reviews of Kenneth Ring’s The Omega Project were mixed: Kirkus Reviews described Ring’s conclusion that UFO experiencers and near-death experiencers were “encounter-prone personalities” as reached “with neat circularity,” while John B. Alexander, reviewing the book in the Journal of Near-Death Studies, wrote that readers “may or may not agree with all of his conclusions,” although he also described them as thought-provoking.

A number of psychologists and memory researchers have proposed non-thanatological explanations for abduction narratives frequently cited in support of the hypothesis. Susan Clancy and Richard McNally, along with other collaborators, have argued that many reports of alien abduction are better explained through sleep paralysis, hypnopompic hallucinations, and false-memory formation than through literal contact with nonhuman beings or post-mortem agencies. In public discussion of this research, Clancy stated that such experiences “seem real but they’re actually the product of our imagination,” and linked abduction reports to a widely shared cultural script surrounding UFOs and aliens.

Religious-studies scholar David J. Halperin has also offered an alternative interpretation, arguing that UFOs should be understood as myths shaped by cultural anxieties and mortality rather than as literal vehicles of extraterrestrial visitation or post-mortem transport. In describing Halperin's book Intimate Alien: The Hidden Story of the UFO (Spiritual Phenomena), Stanford University Press states that “UFOs are a myth” whose force derives not from space travel but from human “longings and terrors,” especially “the end of our existence”; Halperin has similarly described the UFO as being, “at its most basic,” about death.

== See also ==
- Near-death experience
- Psychopomp
- UFO religion

"Other hypotheses":

- Interdimensional hypothesis
- Demonic UFO hypothesis
- Psychosocial hypothesis
- Time-traveler UFO hypothesis
- Cryptoterrestrial hypothesis
- Space animal hypothesis
- Extraterrestrial hypothesis
