= Demonic UFO hypothesis =

Proposal that UFO sightings are the result of a satanic influence

The demonic UFO hypothesis is the proposal that unidentified flying object (UFO) sightings are the result of a satanic influence, or are themselves demons.

== Chronology ==
Occultist Marjorie Cameron connected the 1952 Washington, D.C., UFO incident to the recent death of her partner Jack Parsons, a rocketry expert and disciple of Aleister Crowley.

In 1954, faith healer and evangelist Walter Vinson "W.V." Grant Sr published the booklet "Men in Flying Saucers Identified: Not a Mystery!" suggesting UFOs were demonic.

In the end of the 1960s, British UFO author Gordon Creighton endorsed the theory.

In the wake of the 1973 Pascagoula incident, Rev. Bill Riddick preached a sermon suggesting UFOs were demonic. In 1974, Clifford Wilson authored UFOs and their Mission Impossible which popularized the demonic hypothesis. In the 1975 book UFOs: What on Earth is Happening?, Christian fundamentalist authors John Weldon and Zola Levitt suggested demons are responsible for UFO sightings. Weldon collaborated with Clifford Wilson on the 1978 text Close Encounters: A Better Explanation.

In his popular book Orthodoxy and the Religion of the Future, first published in 1975, American Eastern Orthodox hieromonk Seraphim Rose lays out the Orthodox case that UFOs are actually "demonic manifestations," the newest of the "medium-istic techniques by which the devil gains initiates into his occult realm."

Apocalyptic author Hal Lindsey wrote of demonic UFOs in The 1980s: Countdown to Armageddon. In 1982, Rev. W.T. Widman of Arizona made headlines for his claim that demons fly UFOs.

The 2002 book Lights in the Sky & Little Green Men expanded on the topic. In 2010, British author Nick Redfern explored this concept in his book Final Events, subtitled "Demonic UFOs, Alien Abductions, the Government, and the Afterlife".

Beginning in the late 2010s, Luis Elizondo and others in the disclosure movement discussed the demonic hypothesis. Parapsychologist and engineer Harold E. Puthoff included “demonic/djinn” as one of several candidate categories for interpreting UAP in his 2022 paper Ultraterrestrial Models.

In 2026, Vice President of the United States JD Vance, speaking about UFOs, made the public claim that “I don’t think they’re aliens, I think they’re demons...."

== Angelic and biblical interpretations ==
Some writers have interpreted reports of unidentified flying objects and alleged extraterrestrial encounters through angelic or biblical frameworks, rather than demonic ones. In Flying Saucers: A Modern Myth of Things Seen in the Skies, psychiatrist Carl Jung described some imagined UFO occupants as "technological angels" concerned for human welfare, while treating flying saucers primarily as modern mythic and psychological symbols rather than as established physical craft. Folklorist and UFO writer Jacques Vallée likewise compared modern UFO encounters with earlier accounts of fairies, angels, demons, and other supernatural beings, arguing that the phenomenon should be studied in relation to folklore and religious experience rather than only as reports of spacecraft from other planets. Keith Thompson's Angels and Aliens similarly examined UFO narratives as part of a modern mythic imagination in which extraterrestrial figures can occupy roles formerly associated with supernatural messengers or religious beings.

A related approach appears in ancient astronaut and religious interpretations of the Bible. Presbyterian minister Barry H. Downing argued in The Bible and Flying Saucers that biblical angels, divine "clouds", the pillar of cloud and fire in Exodus, and the Ascension of Jesus could be interpreted as descriptions of beings or vehicles from another world. Downing also wrote that the word angel should be understood functionally as "messenger", and suggested that the biblical religion was delivered by beings "from another world". His views have been discussed by later writers on UFO belief and religion as an example of attempts to reconcile Christianity, extraterrestrial life, and UFO mythology.

Scholars of religion have treated such interpretations as part of a broader pattern in which anomalous aerial or celestial phenomena are explained through the dominant religious, mythological, or technological language of a given period. Tim Lomas and Brendan W. Case from the Harvard Human Flourishing Program argue that interpretations of mysterious celestial encounters have shifted historically "from angels to aliens", while Christopher Partridge has written that early UFO religion often sacralised extraterrestrials as benevolent or messianic figures before later abduction narratives increasingly drew on Christian demonological themes. In the Handbook of UFO Religions, David J. Halperin discusses Jewish interpretations of UFOs, especially modern readings of the vision of Ezekiel, in relation to older religious traditions of heavenly ascent, angels, and divine vehicles.

== Reception and criticism ==
The demonic UFO hypothesis has been criticized by scholars, skeptics, and some religious authorities as a theological or mythological interpretation rather than an empirically testable explanation of unidentified aerial phenomena. Scholars of UFO religion have generally treated demonic interpretations as part of a wider religious response to UFO narratives, with Lomas & Case arguing that anomalous aerial phenomena are often interpreted through the cultural and religious frameworks available to witnesses, and Partridge treating demonic alien narratives as part of a wider history of Christian influence on UFO religion. Skeptical and scientific writers have also objected that supernatural explanations for UFO reports are difficult or impossible to falsify, and scientific investigations of UFO reports have generally emphasized misidentification, hoaxes, psychological factors, atmospheric phenomena, and limitations of witness testimony rather than demonic or supernatural causes.

Some Christian commentators have argued that the existence of extraterrestrial life would not necessarily conflict with Christian doctrine. In 2008, José Gabriel Funes, then director of the Vatican Observatory, stated that belief in extraterrestrial life was not opposed to Catholic teaching. Catholic theologian Corrado Balducci, who wrote on both exorcism and extraterrestrial life, similarly argued that alleged extraterrestrial beings should not automatically be categorized as demonic.

In June 2026, the Roman Catholic Archdiocese of Washington removed Monsignor Stephen Rossetti from his role as an exorcist after he publicly linked UFO sightings to demonic activity. According to the archdiocese, Cardinal Robert W. McElroy said that Rossetti's statements "linking UFOs to demonic presence" and the social media activity of the Saint Michael Center for Spiritual Liberation and Exorcism "gravely undermine the Church's very precise teaching on the devil, demons and exorcism". The Associated Press, in an article republished by The Guardian, reported that Rossetti had said many or most UFO sightings were, in his personal view, demons, while also acknowledging that Catholics could believe in extraterrestrial life.

== See also ==
- Christian demonology
- Classification of demons
- Daimon
- Demonology
- Jinn
- List of demons in fiction
- List of theological demons
- Signs (film), where aliens may be demons

=== Alternate UFO hypotheses ===
- Cryptoterrestrial hypothesis
- Extraterrestrial hypothesis
- Interdimensional hypothesis
- Psychosocial hypothesis
- Space animal hypothesis
- Thanatological UFO hypothesis
- Time-traveler UFO hypothesis

== Additional reading ==
- "Demonic theory of UFOs" by Barry Downing in Story, Ronald; Greenwell, J. Richard (October 9, 1980). The Encyclopedia of UFOs. Dolphin Books – via Google Books.
