= Cryptoterrestrial UFO hypothesis =

Suggestion of an alien civilization on Earth

The cryptoterrestrial UFO hypothesis is a form of UFO hypothesis that claims reports of flying saucers or UFOs are evidence of a hidden, Earth-based, technologically advanced civilization. Aaron John Gulyas, a scholar of conspiracy theories, characterized the hypothesis as "really more of a thought experiment designed to raise questions", while others note that "even people open to the cryptoterrestrial hypothesis remain skeptical".

== Antecedents ==
During the late 19th century, a variety of authors promoted ideas of an undiscovered superior civilization, located in various mythical places. In 1864, Jules Verne's novel Journey to the Center of the Earth imagined a hidden world beneath the Earth's surface. In 1871, the novel The Coming Race was published anonymously; it discussed a subterranean superhuman race with psionic powers. In subsequent years, Theosophy founder Helena Blavatsky spread tales of superhuman masters hidden in the mountains of Tibet. In the ensuing decades, occultists alleged the existence of secret superhuman societies in a variety of mythical places including Shambhala, Atlantis, Thule, Hyperborea, Mu, Lemuria, or even the interior of a Hollow Earth.

In his 1895 novella The Time Machine, H.G. Wells wrote of the Morlocks, a hidden, subterranean race of technological humanoids who feed on helpless surface-dwellers. The 1933 novel Lost Horizon and its 1937 film adaptation depict Shangri-La, a Tibetan paradise inhabited by peaceful, nearly-immortal people. The 1935 serial The Phantom Empire starred Gene Autry as a singing cowboy who stumbles upon an ancient subterranean civilization living beneath his own ranch.

=== The Shaver Mystery ===
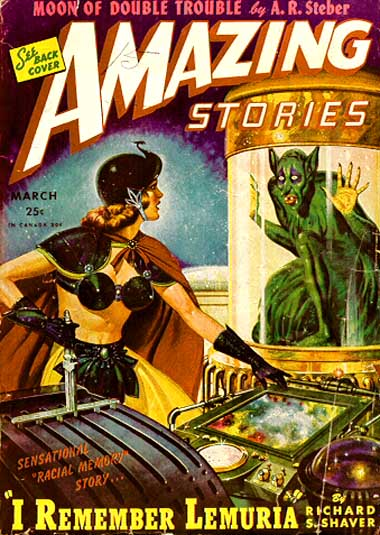
Shaver's first published work, the novella "I Remember Lemuria", was the cover story in the March 1945 Amazing Stories.

During the mid-1940s, an obscure subculture developed around the science fiction magazine Amazing Stories and its tales of Richard Sharpe Shaver, which were presented as a non-fictional account from "a simple man, a worker in metal, employed in a steel mill in Pennsylvania". Since 1945, the magazine had published Shaver's claims that he was in communication with subterranean beings concerned about atomic pollution who piloted disc-shaped craft.

In the October 1947 issue of Amazing Stories, editor Raymond Palmer argued the flying disc flap was proof of Richard Sharpe Shaver's claims. That same issue carried a letter from Shaver in which he argued the truth behind the discs would remain a secret. Shaver wrote:

The discs can be a space invasion, a secret new army plane – or a scouting trip by an enemy country…OR, they can be Shaver's space ships, taking off and landing regularly on earth for centuries past, and seen today as they have always been – as a mystery. They could be leaving earth with cargos of wonder-mech that to us would mean emancipation from a great many of our worst troubles— and we'll never see those cargos…I predict that nothing more will be seen, and the truth of what the strange disc ships really are will never be disclosed to the common people. We just don't count to the people who do know about such things. It isn't necessary to tell us anything.

After Shaver's death in 1975, his editor Raymond Palmer admitted that "Shaver had spent eight years not in the Cavern World, but in a mental institution" being treated for paranoid schizophrenia.

== UFO reports as hidden terrestrials ==
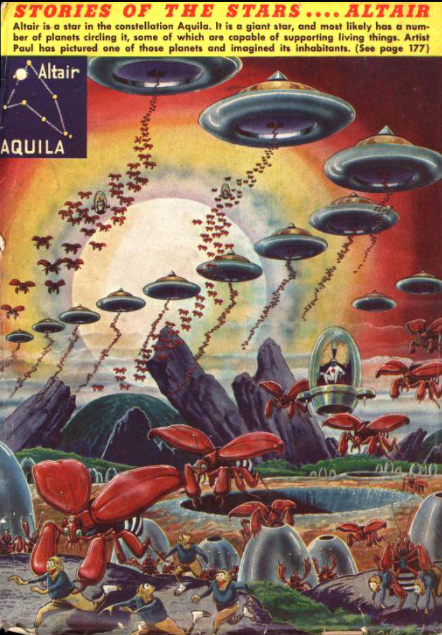
Nearly a year before the flying disc craze, Amazing Stories featured disc-shaped spacecraft.

On June 24, 1947, during the first summer of the Cold War, civilian pilot Kenneth Arnold reported seeing hypersonic disc-shaped craft flying over Washington state. Arnold's claims were reported in newspapers across the United States, marking the beginning of a series of many similar reports. Mainstream sources asserted that the reports were caused by social contagion. By July 7, Arnold was suggesting the reports might have been caused by extraterrestrial spaceships. While some interpreted UFO reports as evidence of extraterrestrials, a few authors suggested non-human terrestrials were responsible. During the flying disc craze in 1947, Theosophists like Meade Layne suggested that flying saucers came from Earth's "etheric plane" while proponents of Hollow Earth suggested that the UFO reports were being caused by a technologically advanced civilization beneath the surface of the Earth. Others suggested the UFO reports might be caused by creatures indigenous to Earth's atmosphere. In the mid 20th-century, authors like Morris Jessup and Erich von Däniken suggested extraterrestrials might have arrived on Earth in prehistoric times, a possibility depicted in the film 2001: A Space Odyssey (1968) by Stanley Kubrick. In his 1956 book They Knew Too Much About Flying Saucers, author Gray Barker suggested the saucers might come from an inner Earth, a connection also explored by Albert K. Bender in his 1962 book Flying Saucers and the Three Men. In 1960, Raymond Bernard's book Flying Saucers from the Earth's Interior further popularized the idea. Beginning in the 1970s, authors like John Keel and Jacques Vallée suggested UFO reports might be linked to supernatural beings they termed "ultra-terrestrials".

In his 1964 article The Nonprevalence of Humanoids, American paleontologist George Gaylord Simpson claimed that the probabilities that, if they existed, extraterrestrial life forms would be anthropomorphic are very low. Alongside the implausibility of humanoid aliens by evolutionary biologist Theodosius Dobzhansky, Simpson's article was discussed in Archaeology, Anthropology and Interstellar Communication, a popular collection of essays edited by astrobiologist Douglas Vakoch and published by NASA in 2014. In his 2002 book Evolving the Alien, biologist Jack Cohen argued that the classic grey alien reported in relation to alleged alien abduction, close encounters, and contactee reports is unlikely to be an extraterrestrial species.

Political scientist and professor Michael Barkun reports that, in some conspiracy theories, UFOs built bases underground for security reasons but remain fundamentally extraterrestrial in origin, while in other conspiracy theories they are believed to be native to the inner-earth.

In the 2025 documentary film The Age of Disclosure, UFO disclosure advocate Luis Elizondo promotes the cryptoterrestrial hypothesis as a potential interpretation of Pentagon UFO reports.

=== The term "Crypto-terrestrial" ===
In the 2000s, author Mac Tonnies coined the term "crypto-terrestrial" to describe theoretical, hidden, indigenous humanoids. Tonnies compared his "Crypto-terrestrial Hypothesis" with what he termed the Null Hypothesis of UFOs, the idea that "UFOs can be universally ascribed to misidentified natural phenomena and sightings of unconventional earthly aircraft". Tonnies contrasted his cryptoterrestrial hypothesis with the "ultraterrestrial hypothesis" of the 1970s, writing:

Keel and Vallee have both ventured essentially "occult" ideas in cosmological terms; both ... require a revision of our understanding of the way reality itself works. But the cryptoterrestrial hypothesis is grounded in a more familiar context. I'm not suggesting unseen dimensions of the need for ufonauts to "downshift" to our level of consciousness. Rather I'm asking if it's feasible that the alleged aliens that occupy historical and contemporary mythology are flesh-and-blood human-like creatures that live right here on Earth.

Tonnies and his cryptoterrestrials were featured in the writings of authors like Nick Redfern, Jerome Clark, Paul Kimball, and Harold E. Puthoff.

The hypothesis is sometimes also referred to as intraterrestrial, or inner-earth.

== In popular culture ==
Gardner Dozois's 1973 science fiction story "Chains of the Sea" features apparently extraterrestrial visitors who are indifferent to humans but interact with hidden intelligent beings native to Earth. In the 1989 film The Abyss, deep-sea divers investigating the wreck of a nuclear-armed submarine make contact with an advanced civilization indigenous to Earth's oceans. In a 1996 episode of The X-Files titled "Jose Chung's From Outer Space", a UFO contactee is revealed to be a fantasy-prone personality when he conveys a message from "Lord Kinbote", a creature who comes "not from outer space, but from inner space... from within the Earth's molten core".

In music, Japanese visual artist Tadanori Yokoo depicted a UFO on the back cover of Miles Davis' 1975 album Agharta, flying in a spotlight over the subterranean kingdom of Agartha. An inscription in the LP's gatefold sleeve explained that:

During various periods in history the supermen of Agharta came to the surface of Earth to teach the human race how to live together in peace and save us from wars, catastrophe, and destruction. The apparent sighting of several flying saucers soon after the bombing of Hiroshima may represent one visitation.

Tadanori was inspired in part by Raymond W. Bernard's book The Hollow Earth.

In their 1997 single "Alien Attack", the Swedish synthpop band S.P.O.C.K sings about a superior terrestrial race who fled to space long ago to escape a natural catastrophe and now is coming back disguised as aliens to claim their planet back. The following year, American rapper Afrika Bambaataa and German DJ WestBam released the single Agharta – The City of Shamballa, under the compound artist name I.F.O. – Identified Flying Objects). The intro titles to the music video read "there are good forces that live inside the Earth sending out UFOs to free the world." Afrika Bambaataa, in the role of a black "UFO priest", sings the words "Don't you wanna go on my UFO?" and "I went to the North Pole I went to the South Pole I stepped in the Congo I stepped in a Hollow Hole they took me to another world the subterranean world it's called Agartha." Towards the end of the music video the point of origin of a fleet of flying saucers is revealed: a foggy gap within the mountains, and as the camera zooms out, planet Earth comes into full view and a big luminous hole in the ground can be seen at the pole of the Earth, out of an into which the UFOs fly.

In cinema, throughout Jordan Peele's 2022 movie Nope, protagonists OJ and Emerald discover that the UFO is not a ship, but a flying cryptid or "space critter". Caltech professor John O. Dabiri worked with Peele and his team to design the UFO monster, specifically its final "biblical angel" form, to make it look like an undiscovered, previously extinct aerial predator, with anatomical and locomotive elements inspired by jellyfish, octopuses, squid, electric eels, and ghost knifefish, as well as the Earth-bound angels from Neon Genesis Evangelion. In the MonsterVerse multimedia franchise, the term MUTO (Massive Unidentified Terrestrial Organism) is used to refer to creatures native to Earth (King Ghidorah being the only extraterrestrial in the series) that have eluded classification, hiding for centuries in the Hollow Earth, their underground homeworld. MUTOs have been dubbed "the UFOs of monsters" by Godzilla’s director Gareth Edwards.

Similar motifs have appeared in Marvel Comics stories involving technologically advanced hidden civilizations native to Earth being mistaken for extraterrestrial invaders. In Fantastic Four vol. 3 #51 (March 2002), the United Nations describes an approaching vessel as an "alien ship"; its occupants are subsequently revealed to be the Inhuman Royal Family, who have returned to their native Earth seeking asylum. Similarly, in The Inhumans #11 (June 1977), they again return to Earth, their home planet, aboard a stolen commandeered Kree spacecraft and their arrival is treated as an apparent alien incursion by U.S. military forces. A comparable scene occurs in the 2018 film Black Panther, when children in Oakland see a previously concealed Wakandan aircraft become visible and describe it as a "Bugatti spaceship"; scholar George Faithful cites the scene in discussing the film's presentation of Wakandan technology as "otherworldly", even though Wakanda is a concealed terrestrial civilization.

== See also ==
- Silurian hypothesis
- Hollow Earth
- Ancient astronauts

Other hypotheses:

- Space animal hypothesis
- Time traveler UFO hypothesis
- Interdimensional hypothesis
- Thanatological UFO hypothesis
- Demonic UFO hypothesis
- Psychosocial hypothesis
- Extraterrestrial hypothesis
