= Terracon =

2000 video game

- Developer: PictureHouse Software
- Publisher: Sony Computer Entertainment
- Artists: Dennis Gustafsson; James Duncan; Paul Helman; John Laws
- Composer: Jim Croft
- Platform: PlayStation
- Release: EU: 25 August 2000
- Genre: Action-adventure
- Mode: Single-player

Terracon is a 2000 action-adventure video game developed by British studio PictureHouse Software and published by Sony Computer Entertainment for the PlayStation. It was only released in Europe; a North American release by Midway was planned, but it was cancelled for unknown reasons.

== Gameplay ==
Gameplay screenshot

The main objective of each level, of which there are over thirty in total, is to collect the required number of launch code cartridges (LCCs) to launch the respective planet's missile defence system at the Terracon mothership. The number of LCCs in a level ranges from one to three. The player usually obtains LCCs by collecting them as they progress through a level; sometimes, however, the player is required to defeat a "boss" enemy to obtain an LCC. At the end of each level, the player must create a beacon in order to summon their dropship. Beacons, like every other type of mesh, require genergy to create them. Upon generating the beacon, Xed's dropship will appear above a green access-point. The player will be teleported into the dropship upon accessing the access-point.

Genergy is the fundamental pick-up that the player will encounter throughout the course of the game. It, in varying quantities and varieties obtained by the player, introduces a puzzle-solving aspect to the game. Genergy is used to destroy enemies, break open containers, build/destroy a wide variety of structures, and to act of a form of in-game currency.

The player's health is based on a one-hundred-point system. If the player sustains damage from an enemy, they lose twenty-five points. Because the player's health count can drop below zero, the player can sustain five hits before dying. Health can be regained by collecting life force units. The player can gain a maximum of four lives, which is achieved by collecting surplus life-force-regenerators, that is, by collecting them while the player's health is already full.

Another important aspect of gameplay are the Terracon outrider pick-up systems (TOPS). TOPS are small, spherical, differently coloured pick-ups which orbit the player upon collection, with different purposes for each colour. The player can carry a maximum of four TOPS; upon collecting a fifth, once of the player's current TOPS, selected at random, is ejected from the player's collection. Completing a level with TOPS in-tow allows the player to earn TOPS replication points, which vary in accordance with their rarity and usefulness. Before beginning a level, the player can 'buy' TOPS from the TOPS replication screen using amassed points, giving them an instant advantage in the beginning of the level.

== Plot ==
The Plutonians, a race of grey aliens to which the game's protagonist, Xed, belongs to, inhabits the planet Pluto of the Solar System. A highly technologically advanced species, the Plutonians were faced with an issue which threatened the very future of their civilisation: overpopulation.

Faced with the consequences of extreme overpopulation, the Plutonians found that their only solution was to colonise other planets in the Solar System, by means of terraforming: turning barren, uninhabitable planets into thriving, hospitable worlds. Thus, the Plutonian' chief scientist, and Xed's sidekick, Doc initiates the Terracon project.

The Terracon consisted of a massive, biological computer; a synthetic brain capable of efficiently controlling the legion of Terracon machines required to terraform and tame the planets' harsh environments. Despite highly variable degrees of success in terraforming, with some planets rendered more hospitable than others, the endeavour was considered a success, and the time came to shut down the Terracon, but not solely because the Terracon had fulfilled its purpose.

As the Terracon began to develop a sense of self-awareness, the Plutonian committee deemed it an imperative to terminate the Terracon, fearing its new-found powers of intelligence could spiral out of control.

Before Xed is due to begin a training session, Doc notifies Xed that they appear to have been involuntarily shut down by the Terracon.

Afterwards, both Doc and Xed board the Terracon's mothership to meet it in person, and attempt to reason with it, explaining why it needs to be shut down. Doc explains that Plutonian committee decided to shut down the Terracon secretly, without prior notification, but given the Terracon's exemplary service, he chose otherwise. Regardless, the Terracon rejects Doc's shutdown orders, reverses the procedure, and kills him with shot from a Terracon machine.

Xed narrowly escapes from two pursuing machines, before reaching his dropship. The Terracon, in its first act of vengeance, proceeds to obliterate the Greys' home world, stating, 'By my fire, all shall be undone!' As the Terracon mothership looms over the remains of the destroyed planet, Xed's dropship hides from its view on the side of a chunk of the planet's remains. As Xed looks out of its window, he is met with the grim view of the lifeless bodies of his people, floating in space.

Later, on board his dropship, mourning the destruction of his species, Xed, to his amazement, is met by a hologram of Doc. Doc explains that he uploaded his consciousness to Xed's dropship as a 'small precaution'. Doc informs Xed that the only way to destroy the Terracon is by turning the terraformed planets' missile defence systems against it. Doc informs Xed that the missile systems rely on the collection of launch code cartridges (or LCCs). Doc explains, however, that, for security reasons, the cartridges have been disseminated all over each of the terraformed planets.

Xed, guided by the now-holographic Doc, then embarks on a journey through the Solar System to find and collect all the required LCCs, spanning the terraformed worlds of Venus, Jupiter, Neptune, Uranus, Earth, and various moons.

Upon the collection of all the LCCs for each planet, Xed initiates the firing sequence for the planet's defence systems, targeting the Terracon mothership. With each launch of the systems, the Terracon sustains increasing amounts of damage.

Following the final attack on the Terracon, launched from Earth, the Terracon mothership, critically damaged, crash-lands on Earth's moon, preceded by an immense explosion. On Earth, Xed celebrates the destruction of the Terracon with the early hominids, who populate the planet. Xed and the early hominids interbreed to create a new species: modern man.

At an unspecified point in the future, two British astronauts are seen exploring the Moon. One of the astronauts, having discovered a deep cavern, beckons to the other to investigate with him. As the pair of astronauts begin venture into the cave, a walkthrough to the depths of the caves reveals the last remnants of the Terracon module, containing the Terracon still alive within.

== Reception ==
Reception

Review scores
Publication	Score
4Players	62%
Consoles +	80%
Computer and Video Games	4/5
Edge	5/10
HobbyConsolas	85/100
Jeuxvideo.com	14/20
Joypad	6/10
M! Games	57%
Mega Fun	77/100
Micromanía	72/100
Play	80%
Video Games (DE)	80%
Power	8/10
Power Unlimited	8.0/10

Terracon received a mixture of opinions from reviewers, though a majority gave it a positive recommendation.
