= Interdimensional =

Interdimensional may refer to:

- Interdimensional hypothesis
- Interdimensional doorway
- Interdimensional travel
