= Official Denial =

1993 science fiction TV movie

- Written by: Bryce Zabel
- Directed by: Brian Trenchard-Smith
- Starring: Parker Stevenson; Dirk Benedict; Erin Gray; Michael Pate; Chad Everett
- Countries of origin: Australia; United States
- Original language: English

Production
- Producer: Darryl Sheen
- Running time: 83 minutes
- Production company: Wilshire Court Productions

Original release
- Release: 20 November 1993

Official Denial is a 1993 made-for-television science fiction film directed by Brian Trenchard-Smith and written by Bryce Zabel, starring Parker Stevenson, Dirk Benedict and Erin Gray, about a man who is abducted by aliens. It is eventually revealed that the aliens are in reality humans from the future.

The film was shot on the Gold Coast, Queensland, Australia.

Official Denial was SyFy's first vidpic, when the television channel was still called Sci-Fi Channel.

== Cast ==
- Parker Stevenson as Paul Corliss
- Dirk Benedict as Lt Colonel Dan Lerner
- Erin Gray as Annie Corliss
- Michael Pate
- Chad Everett as General Spalding
- Gus Mercurio as Joe Dan
- Justin Monjo as Franklin Kolbe
- Robert Mammone as Michael Novado
- Kim Krejus as Dr Clark
- Holly Brisley as Dos
- Tiriel Mora as Dos (voice)
- Peter Curtin as Jonathon Applegate
