= Grey alien =

Alleged type of extraterrestrial being

Grey aliens
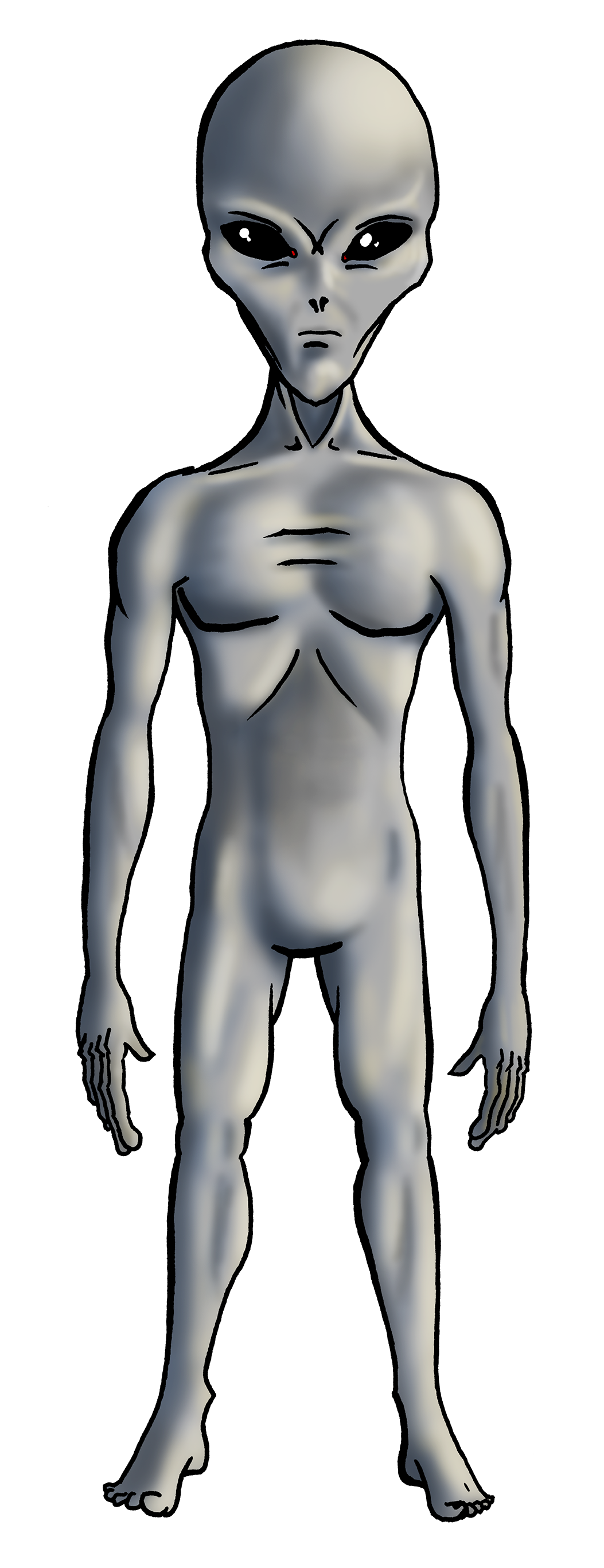
- Artist's interpretation of a Grey alien showing certain prototypical features: an enlarged head, large black eyes, a small mouth, diminished nostrils, a frail stature, and a lack of a nose or genitals.

Creature information
- Other name(s): Zeta Reticulans, Roswell Greys, Roswell Aliens, Greys,
- Grouping: Extraterrestrials or beings of other origin
- Similar entities: Little green men
- Folklore: Ufology

Origin
- Region: Worldwide
- Details: Humanoids with small and lithe bodies (sometimes described as tall), pale grey skin, large foreheads, black almond-shaped eyes, as well as small noses, lips, and ears; Popularized in UFO folklore by the Barney and Betty Hill abduction case (1961)

Grey aliens, also referred to as Zeta Reticulans, Roswell Greys, or simply Greys, (Note: Spelled "Gray" in certain dialects) are purported extraterrestrial beings. They are frequently reported in alleged alien abductions and other close encounters. Greys are typically described as hairless humanoids with grey skin, small bodies, disproportionately large heads, and large almond-shaped eyes without sclerae.

The 1961 Barney and Betty Hill abduction claim was key to the dissemination of the concept of Grey aliens and their subsequent popularity in modern culture. Precursor figures have been described in science fiction and similar descriptions appeared in later accounts of the 1947 Roswell UFO incident and early accounts of the 1948 Aztec UFO hoax.

The Grey alien is cited as an archetypal image of an intelligent, non-human being and extraterrestrial life in general, as well as an iconic trope of popular culture in the age of space exploration.

== Description ==
=== Appearance ===
Greys are typically depicted as grey-skinned, diminutive humanoid beings that possess reduced forms of, or completely lack, external human body parts such as noses, ears, or sex organs. Their bodies are usually depicted as being elongated, having a small chest, and lacking in muscular definition and visible skeletal structure. Their legs are depicted as being shorter and jointed differently from humans, with limbs proportionally different from those of a human.

Greys are depicted as possessing unusually large heads in proportion to their bodies, as well as having no hair, no noticeable outer ears or noses, and small orifices for ears, nostrils, and mouths. In drawings, Greys are almost always depicted featuring very large black eyes without sclerae. They are frequently described as shorter than average adult humans; however, both short and tall variations appear in reports.

=== Association with Zeta Reticuli ===
The association between Grey aliens and Zeta Reticuli originated with the interpretation of a map drawn by Betty Hill by a schoolteacher named Marjorie Fish sometime in 1969. Betty Hill, under hypnosis, had claimed to have been shown a map that displayed the aliens' home system and nearby stars. Upon learning of this, Fish attempted to create a model from a drawing produced by Hill, eventually determining that the stars marked as the aliens' home were Zeta Reticuli, a binary star system.

== History ==
=== Origins ===
In literature, descriptions of beings similar to Grey aliens predate claims of supposed encounters with them. In 1893, H. G. Wells presented a description of humanity's future appearance in the article "The Man of the Year Million", describing humans as having no mouths, noses, or hair, and with large heads. In 1895, Wells also depicted the Eloi, a successor species to humanity, in similar terms in the novel The Time Machine. Both share many characteristics with future perceptions of Greys. In 1897, H. G. Wells wrote The War of the Worlds. In the book, Wells depicts an advanced Martian species with large, dark-colored, oval eyes and gray, hairless skin. It is briefly mentioned that there is also a humanoid variant of the species. This Martian species may have inspired the design of the Greys in popular culture.

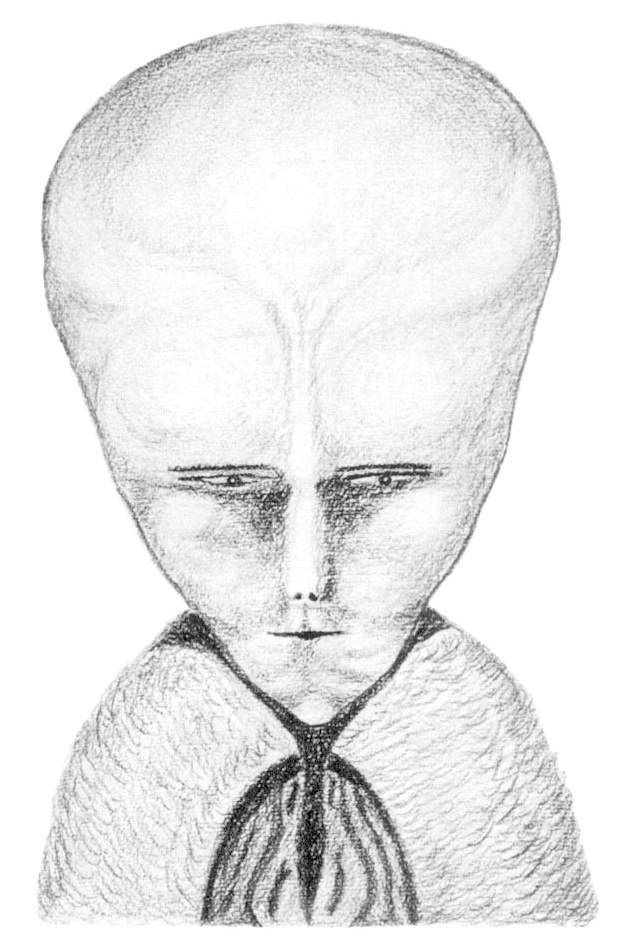
Crowley's drawing of "Lam", the entity that he allegedly made contact with

As early as 1917, the occultist Aleister Crowley described a meeting with a "preternatural entity" named Lam that was similar in appearance to a modern Grey. Crowley claimed to have contacted Lam through a process called the "Amalantrah Workings", which he believed allowed humans to contact beings from outer space and across dimensions. Other occultists and ufologists, many of whom have retroactively linked Lam to later Grey encounters, have since described their own visitations from him, with one describing the being as a "cold, computer-like intelligence", and utterly beyond human comprehension.

...the creatures did not resemble any race of humans. They were short, shorter than the average Japanese, and their heads were big and bald, with strong, square foreheads, and very small noses and mouths, and weak chins. What was most extraordinary about them were the eyes—large, dark, gleaming, with a sharp gaze. They wore clothes made of soft grey fabric, and their limbs seemed to be similar to those of humans.

— Gustav Sandgren, The Unknown Danger (1933)

In 1933, the Swedish novelist Gustav Sandgren, using the pen name Gabriel Linde, published a science fiction novel called Den okända faran (The Unknown Danger), in which he describes a race of extraterrestrials who wore clothes made of soft grey fabric and were short, with big bald heads and large, dark, gleaming eyes. The novel, aimed at young readers, included illustrations of the imagined aliens. According to author Eden Lee Lackner in her "Grays" chapter of the 2019 compendium Aliens in Popular Culture: "Sandgren's aliens solidify the appearance of grays, as his description is the template upon which the popular conception of these beings rests."

=== Barney and Betty Hill abduction ===
In 1965, newspaper reports of the Betty and Barney Hill abduction made the Grey archetype famous. The alleged abductees, Betty and Barney Hill, claimed that in 1961, humanoid alien beings with greyish skin had abducted them and taken them aboard a flying saucer.

In his 1990 article "Entirely Unpredisposed", Martin Kottmeyer suggested that Barney's memories revealed under hypnosis might have been influenced by an episode of the science-fiction television show The Outer Limits titled "The Bellero Shield", which was broadcast twelve days before Barney's first hypnotic session. The episode featured an extraterrestrial with large eyes, who says, "In all the universes, in all the unities beyond the universes, all who have eyes have eyes that speak." The report from the regression featured a scenario that was in some respects similar to the television show. In part, Kottmeyer wrote:

Wraparound eyes are an extreme rarity in science fiction films. I know of only one instance. They appeared on the alien of an episode of an old TV series The Outer Limits entitled "The Bellero Shield." A person familiar with Barney's sketch in "The Interrupted Journey" and the sketch done in collaboration with the artist David Baker will find a "frisson" of "déjà vu" creeping up his spine when seeing this episode. The resemblance is much abetted by an absence of ears, hair, and nose on both aliens. Could it be by chance? Consider this: Barney first described and drew the wraparound eyes during the hypnosis session dated 22 February 1964. "The Bellero Shield" was first broadcast on 10 February 1964. Only twelve days separate the two instances. If the identification is admitted, the commonness of wraparound eyes in the abduction literature falls to cultural forces.

— Martin Kottmeyer, Entirely Unpredisposed: The Cultural Background of UFO Reports

Carl Sagan echoed Kottmeyer's suspicions in his 1997 book, The Demon Haunted World: Science as a Candle in the Dark, where Invaders from Mars was cited as another potential inspiration.

=== Diffusion into folklore ===
After the Hills' encounter, the concept of Greys would go on to become more commonly reported in ufology and other extraterrestrial-related folklore. This is particularly true in the case of the United States: according to journalist C. D. B. Bryan in his book Close Encounters of the Fourth Kind, ufologist Jenny Randles reported in 1992 that 73% of all reported alien encounters in the United States described Grey aliens, somewhat higher than continental Europe which had a percentage of roughly 48%, and significantly higher than the United Kingdom where the percentage hovered around only 12%.

A Grey as popularized, from the cover of Communion, by Whitley Strieber: The portrait was painted by Ted Seth Jacobs to Strieber's description and approval.

During the early 1980s, Greys were linked to the alleged crash-landing of a flying saucer in Roswell, New Mexico, in 1947. A number of publications contained statements from individuals who claimed to have seen the U.S. military handling a number of unusually proportioned, bald, child-sized beings. These individuals claimed, during and after the incident, that the beings had oversized heads and slanted eyes, but scant other distinguishable facial features.

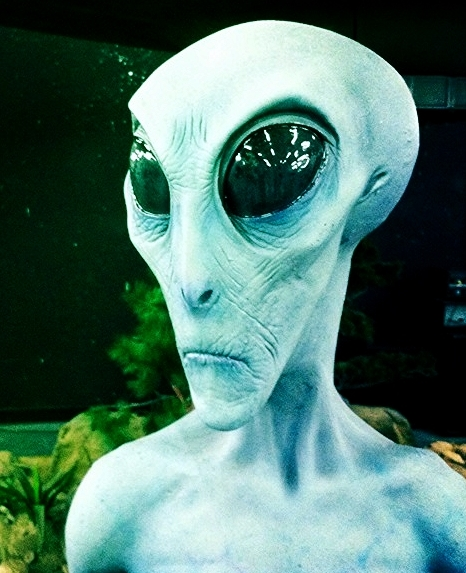
UFO museum, Roswell

In 1987, novelist Whitley Strieber published the book Communion, which, unlike his previous works, was categorized as non-fiction, and described a number of close encounters he alleged to have experienced with Greys, as well as other unknown beings. The book became a New York Times bestseller, and New Line Cinema released a 1989 film adaptation that starred Christopher Walken as Strieber. Strieber has stated in his works that he was unsure whether the beings were truly extraterrestrial, instead opting to call them "visitors".

In 1988, Christophe Dechavanne interviewed the French science-fiction writer and ufologist Jimmy Guieu on TF1's Ciel, mon mardi!. Besides mentioning Majestic 12, Guieu described the existence of what he called "the little greys", which later on became better known in French under the name: les Petits-Gris. Guieu later wrote two docudramas, using as a plot the Grey aliens / Majestic-12 conspiracy theory as described by John Lear and Milton William Cooper: the series "E.B.E." (for "Extraterrestrial Biological Entity"): E.B.E.: Alerte rouge (first part) (1990) and E.B.E.: L'entité noire d'Andamooka (second part) (1991).

Greys have since become the subject of conspiracy theories. Many conspiracy theorists believe that Greys represent part of a government-led disinformation or plausible deniability campaign, or that they are a product of government mind-control experiments. During the 1990s, popular culture also began to increasingly link Greys to a number of military-industrial complex and New World Order conspiracy theories.

In 1995, filmmaker Ray Santilli claimed to have obtained 22 reels of 16 mm film that depicted the autopsy of a "real" Grey supposedly recovered from the site of the 1947 incident in Roswell. In 2006, however, Santilli announced that the film was not original, but was instead a "reconstruction" created after the original film was found to have degraded. He maintained that a real Grey had been found and autopsied on camera in 1947, and that the footage released to the public contained a percentage of that original footage.

== Analysis ==
=== In close encounter claims and ufology ===
Greys are often involved in alien abduction claims. Among reports of alien encounters, Greys make up about 73% in the United States, 67% in Brazil, 48% in continental Europe, and around 12% in the United Kingdom. Reports of Greys in alleged abductions include descriptions of two distinct groups that differ in height.

The eyes are frequently a focus of abduction claims, which often describe a Grey staring into the eyes of an abductee when conducting mental procedures. This staring is claimed to induce hallucinogenic states or directly provoke different emotions.

Abduction claims are often described as extremely traumatic, similar to an abduction by humans or even a sexual assault in the level of trauma and distress. The emotional impact of perceived abductions can be as great as that of combat, sexual abuse, and other traumatic events.

However, in recent years, there has been a shift in perspective among some individuals who have alleged abductions; sociologists Erich Goode and D. Angus Vail explain in Extreme Deviance:

In recent years, abductees have started to question their relationship to the Grays. While most abductees still believe them to be abusers, a growing subset believe the aliens are misunderstood. Although terrifying at first, the "abduction" has turned into a positive experience. Such benign encounters are similar to the contactee tales and, indeed, some abductees now report experiences with both Nordics and Grays. As the ranks of these "new" abductees have grown, they have created the label "experiencers." Experiencers are people who have come to view as positive what was initially a frightening UFO experience.

=== Psychocultural expression of intelligence ===
Neurologist Steven Novella proposes that Grey aliens are a byproduct of the human imagination, with the Greys' most distinctive features representing everything that modern humans traditionally link with intelligence. "The aliens, however, do not just appear as humans, they appear like humans with those traits we psychologically associate with intelligence."

=== The medical hypothesis ===
In referencing abduction accounts that have included beings resembling Greys, psychiatrist David V. Forrest has suggested that memories of previously experienced medical procedures may be a contributory factor to a psychological provenance for the abduction phenomenon. In this vein, he further addressed the fact that the social stigma surrounding the phenomenon should therefore be removed, stating: "such persons should be encouraged not to be ashamed, to bring forth their experiences when they face medical or dental anesthesia, and tell their doctors or anesthesiologists about them, because one's mental set going into a procedure affects its outcome."

=== The "mother" hypothesis ===
In 2005, Frederick V. Malmstrom, writing in Skeptic magazine, Volume 11, issue 4, presented his idea that Greys are actually residual memories of early childhood development. Malmstrom reconstructed the face of a Grey through the transformation of a mother's face based on science regarding early-childhood sensation and perception. Malmstrom's study offered a hypothesis that presented an alternative to the idea of the literal existence of Greys in abduction accounts.

=== Evolutionary implausibility ===
According to biologist Jack Cohen, the typical image of a Grey, assuming that it would have evolved from a world with different environmental and ecological conditions from Earth, is too physiologically similar to a human to be credible as a representation of an alien.

=== Other hypotheses ===
The interdimensional, cryptoterrestrial, and time-traveller hypotheses attempt to provide an alternative explanation to account for the humanoid anatomy and behavior of these alleged beings.

== In popular culture ==
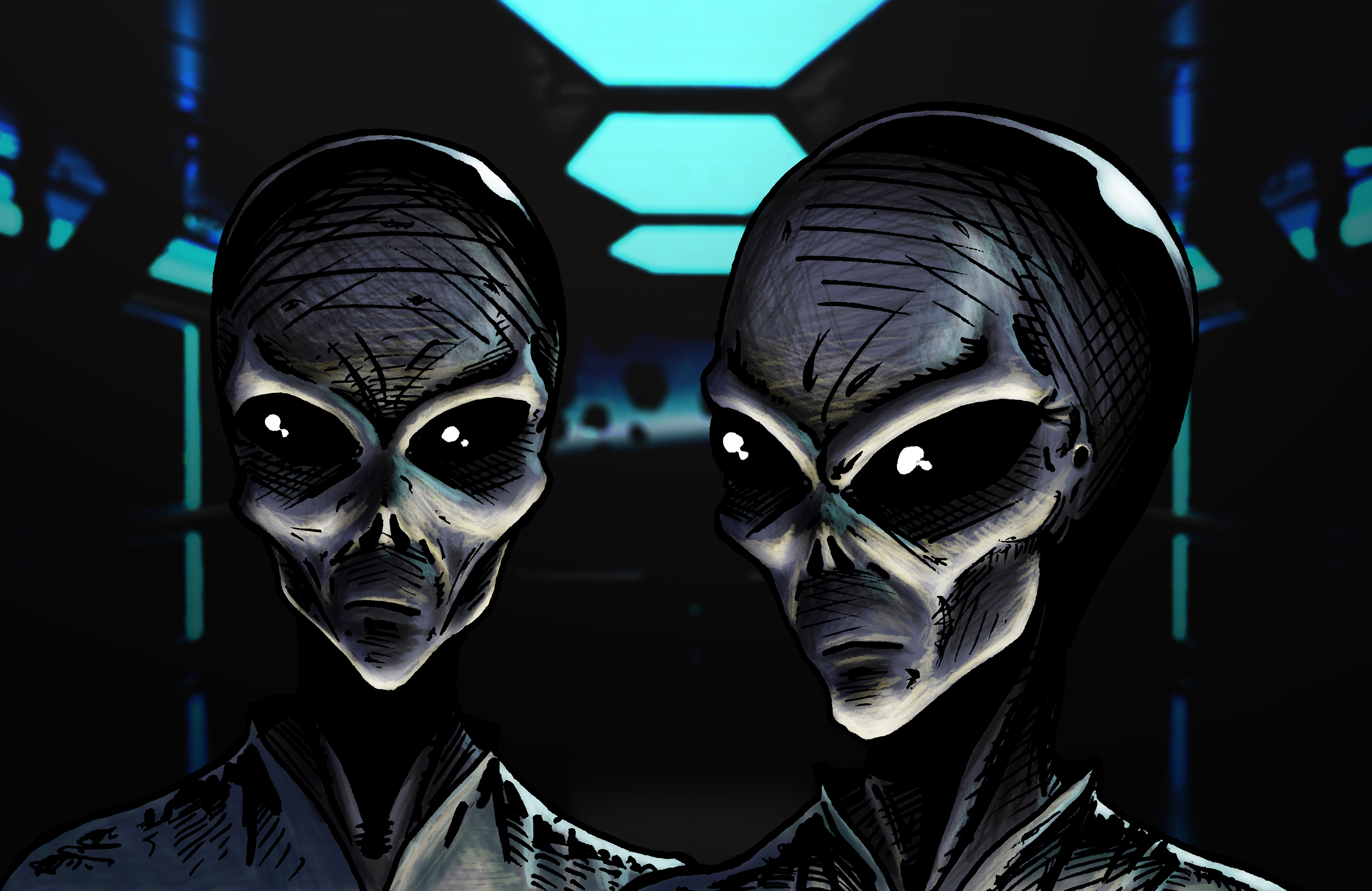
Grey aliens are a common way to depict extraterrestrials in fiction.

Depictions of Grey aliens have gone on to appear in a number of films and television shows, supplanting the previously popular little green men. As early as 1966, for example, the superhero character Ultraman was explicitly based on them, and they were later featured in Close Encounters of the Third Kind (1977). Greys have also been worked into space opera and other interstellar settings: in Babylon 5, the Greys are referred to as the "Vree" and are depicted as being allies and trade partners of 23rd-century Earth, while in the Stargate franchise they are called the "Asgard" and depicted as ancient astronauts allied with modern-day Earth. South Park refers to them as "visitors", and the creators hid them as Easter eggs in numerous episodes.

During the 1990s, plotlines wherein Greys were linked to conspiracy theories became common. A well-known example is the Fox television series The X-Files that began airing in 1993, which combined the quest to find proof of the existence of Grey-like extraterrestrials alongside a number of conspiracy theory subplots as part of its main narrative. Other notable examples include the XCOM video game franchise (where they are called "Sectoids"); Dark Skies, first broadcast in 1996, which expanded upon the MJ-12 conspiracy; and American Dad!, which features a Grey-like alien named Roger, whose backstory draws from both the Roswell incident and Area 51 conspiracy theories.

The 2011 film Paul tells the story of a Grey named Paul who attributes the frequent depiction of his people in science fiction pop culture to the US government deliberately inserting the stereotypical Grey alien image into mainstream media; this is done so that if humanity were to come into contact with Paul's species, no immediate shock would occur as a result of their appearance. Child abduction by Greys is a key plot point in the 2013 film, Dark Skies.

Greys appear in Syfy's 2021 science fiction dramedy series Resident Alien.

The Greys appear as the main antagonistic faction in the 2023 independent game Greyhill Incident.

== See also ==
- Alien Autopsy
- Budd Hopkins
- Extraterrestrials in fiction
- Insectoid
- John E. Mack
- List of alleged extraterrestrial beings
- Little green men
- Men in black
- Mythic humanoids
- Nordic aliens
- Stan Romanek
- Starchild skull
