= Greyhill Incident =

2023 survival horror game

- Developer: Refugium Games
- Publisher: Perp Games
- Director: Aaron Roller
- Designer: Aaron Roller
- Programmer: Aaron Roller
- Writers: Aaron Roller; Alwin Roller
- Composer: Eric Gordon Berg
- Platforms: PlayStation 4; PlayStation 5; Windows; Xbox One; Xbox Series X/S
- Release: June 9, 2023 (PC); June 13, 2023 (console)
- Genre: Survival horror

Greyhill Incident is a 2023 survival horror game developed by Refugium Games and published by Perp Games. The game revolves around an alien invasion in the fictional town of Greyhill. It was released for PlayStation 4, PlayStation 5, Windows, Xbox One, and Xbox Series X/S in June 2023.

Greyhill Incident received negative reviews from critics, who criticized its plot, gameplay, and dialogue, although its environment and visual design was praised.

== Overview ==
Greyhill Incident takes place in 1992 in the fictional town of Greyhill, which is terrorized by an alien invasion of grey aliens. Players take the role of Ryan Baker, a conspiracy theorist whose son is abducted by the aliens. Its premise was compared to alien films like Signs (2002), Men in Black (1997), Independence Day (1996) and the television series The X-Files.

Players must use the game's stealth mechanics to evade aliens by hiding in cars and trash cans as they complete quests to help other residents of the town. Players can combat aliens with a baseball bat and a revolver, although ammunition is limited in-game. They are also able to use a mechanically powered flashlight.

== Development ==
Greyhill Incident is the first game from the indie developer Refugium Games. Refugium originally intended to release the game on PC but partnered with publisher Perp Games in 2022 to develop console editions. The game was released on Steam for PC on June 9, 2023. It was released on PlayStation 4, PlayStation 5 and Xbox Series X and Series S on June 13. A physical edition, called the "Abducted Edition", with additional content was released for PlayStation 5 in July 2023, with physical editions for PlayStation 4 and Xbox also in development. This edition allows users to play the game in "found footage" mode, which imitates the appearance of camcorder footage. The "Abducted Collectors Edition" includes a physical copy of the game, the digital soundtrack for the game, a newspaper clipping describing the events of the game, and a manual for creating a tinfoil hat.

== Reception ==
Prior to its release, Greyhill Incident was included on several lists of the most anticipated horror games of 2023. After release, the game received "generally unfavorable" reviews from critics, according to review aggregator website Metacritic. Metacritic listed the PC version as the third worst game of 2023.

Critics noted the game's nonsensical plot, tedious gameplay and unsatisfying stealth mechanics, poor voice acting and dialogue, and frequent bugs. Several reviewers described the game as a missed opportunity in spite of its interesting premise. Travis Northup of IGN and Cade Onder of ComicBook.com both negatively compared the game's writing to the output of an AI chatbot. The repetitive gameplay and lack of waypoints was also criticized.

The game's environment and overall visual design was praised by critics as one of its few positive aspects. Branden Lizardi of TheGamer praised the game's visual design but criticized the overly dark lighting which made it difficult to see. Mike Holtz of Bloody Disgusting gave the game a mostly positive review, praising its atmosphere and horror elements.
