= Zola Levitt =

American evangelist and writer (1938-2006)

Zola Levitt (December 3, 1938 – April 19, 2006) was an author and evangelist who founded Zola Levitt Ministries, in Dallas, Texas, in 1979.

== Early life and education ==
Levitt was born in Pittsburgh on December 3, 1938. He was raised as a Conservative Jew and attended Hebrew school in his youth. He graduated from Peabody High School in 1955. He attended the University of Pittsburgh, Duquesne University (where he received a bachelors of music in 1961), Miami University of Ohio and Indiana University School of Music (where he obtained a masters music in 1963).

In 1971, at age 32, Levitt was studying for his doctorate and working as an editor at Indiana University when he read the New Testament at the urging of Campus Crusade for Christ ministers, leading to his conversion to Christianity.

== Ministry and religious works ==
Known for his relatability, charisma and visits to evangelical churches dressed as a Levite, and criticism of other evangelical ministries, Levitt grew his organization's outreach to a national scale. Levitt authored books and wrote, produced, and directed Judeo-Christian music and musicals. Furthermore, he created a popular free print publication, The Levitt Letter, which covered global news with a Messianic focus. He also produced and starred in his own television and radio programs, concluding each episode with his signature phrase “Pray for the Peace of Jerusalem.”

Because Levitt sought to share the New Testament with Jews through the use of Old Testament Scripture, he drew "protest from the factions of the Jewish community, which objected to what they felt was a distortion of Jewish teachings." The Forward described Zola Levitt Ministries as "a group well-known for trying to blur the lines between Christianity and Judaism. Its promotional materials use the menorah, the Israeli flag and the "chai" symbol to promote Jesus."

Levitt sponsored a grove in Israel to which his followers could donate trees with the purpose of making the country green in preparation for Christ's return.

== Theological beliefs ==
Levitt was a classical dispensationalist, believing that the nation of Israel is playing a crucial role in signalling the beginning of the end times. Levitt disagreed with progressive dispensationalism, which supposes that aspects of the Millennial Kingdom are present in the modern world. Levitt opposed such a stance because he believed it minimized the role of Israel in God's plan for the future.

== Personal life and death ==
Levitt was married twice, and had two children. He died of cancer on April 19, 2006.

== Selected publications ==
- Satan in the Sanctuary (Moody Press, 1973)
- Jesus—The Jew’s Jew (Creation House, 1973)
- How Did a Fat, Balding, Middle-Aged Jew Like You Become a Jesus Freak? (Tyndale House, 1974)
- Guts, God, and the Super Bowl (Zondervan, 1974)
- The Coming Russian Invasion of Israel (Moody Press, 1974)
- Corned Beef, Knishes and Christ (Tyndale House, 1975)
- Israel, My Love (Moody Press, 1975)
- Israel in Agony: The Beginning of the End? (Harvest House, 1975)
- How to Win at Losing (Tyndale House, 1976)
- The Transcendental Explosion (Harvest House, 1976)
- Creation: A Scientist’s Choice (Victor Books, 1976)
- The Spirit of Sun Myung Moon (Harvest House, 1976)
- Christ in the Country Club (Herald Press, 1976)
- UFO’s: What on Earth Is Happening? (Bantam Books, 1976)
- Jews and Jesus (Moody Press, 1977)
- Confessions of a Contemporary Jew (Tyndale House, 1977)
- Israel and Tomorrow’s Temple (Moody Press, 1977)
- An Israeli Love Story (Moody Press, 1978)
- The Cairo Connection (Harvest House, 1978)
- The Underground Church of Jerusalem (Thomas Nelson, 1978)
- Some of My Best Friends Are Christians (Regal Books, 1978)
- Meshumed! (Moody Press, 1979)
