= Saint Michael Center for Spiritual Liberation and Exorcism =

Roman Catholic facility

Religion
- Affiliation: Roman Catholicism
- Province: Manila
- Patron: Michael the Archangel

Location
- Location: Guadalupe Viejo, Makati, Metro Manila
- Country: Philippines

Architecture
- Groundbreaking: May 17, 2022

The Saint Michael Center for Spiritual Liberation and Exorcism is a Roman Catholic facility in Makati, Metro Manila, Philippines. It is touted to be the first exorcism center in Asia.

== History ==
After "more than seven years of prayers, planning and fundraising", the groundbreaking for the Saint Michael Center for Spiritual Liberation and Exorcism took place on May 17, 2022, at Guadalupe Viejo, Makati. It was built by the Roman Catholic Archdiocese of Manila as a center to deal with alleged demonic possessions, especially those affecting the "poorest of the poor", as well as a training center for exorcists in the region. It will be the first facility of its kind in Asia.

== Tenants and facilities ==
The Saint Michael Center is a three-storey structure within the Our Lady of Guadalupe Minor Seminary. It will house the Philippine Association of Catholic Exorcists (PACE) of the Catholic Bishops' Conference of the Philippines (CBCP). PACE is affiliated with the International Association of Exorcists in Italy. It will also be occupied by the Commission on Extraordinary Phenomena, the Ministry of Exorcism and the Ministry on Visions and Phenomena of the Archdiocese of Manila. It will also have a chapel dedicated to Mary mother of Jesus as the Our Lady of the Angels.
