= Evolving the Alien =

Book by Jack Cohen

Evolving the Alien: The Science of Extraterrestrial Life
- Cover, first UK hardback edition
- Author: Jack Cohen and Ian Stewart
- Language: English
- Subject: Astrobiology
- Genre: Non-fiction
- Publisher: Ebury Press
- Publication date: 2002
- Publication place: United Kingdom
- Media type: Print, e-book
- Pages: 369 pp.
- ISBN: 0-09-187927-2
- OCLC: 50101272
- Dewey Decimal: 576.8/39 22
- LC Class: QB54 .C64 2002b

Evolving the Alien: The Science of Extraterrestrial Life (published in the US, and UK second edition as What Does a Martian Look Like?: The Science of Extraterrestrial Life) is a 2002 popular science book about xenobiology by biologist Jack Cohen and mathematician Ian Stewart.

The concept for the book originated with a lecture that Cohen had revised over many years, which he called POLOOP, for "Possibility of Life on Other Planets".

== Synopsis ==
Cohen and Stewart argue against a conception of extraterrestrial life that assumes life can only evolve in environments similar to Earth (the so-called Rare Earth hypothesis), and that extraterrestrial lifeforms will converge toward characteristics similar to those of life on Earth, a common trope of certain science fiction styles. They suggest that any investigation of extraterrestrial life relying on these assumptions is overly restrictive, and it is possible to make a scientific and rational study of the possibility of life forms that are so different from life on Earth that we may not even recognise them as life in the first instance.

Cohen and Stewart return to two contrasts throughout the book. The first is between exobiology (which considers the possibilities for conventional, Earth-like biology on Earth-like planets) and xenoscience (which embraces a much broader and more speculative range for the forms that life may take). The second contrast drawn is between parochials (features of life that are likely to be unique to Earth) and universals (features that are likely to appear wherever life arises).

Cohen and Stewart supplement the limited hard science available on their subject with numerous references to science fiction of both their own and others' creation, including 28 plot summaries of classic SF stories.

== Reception ==
In its review of Evolving the Alien, the London Review of Books commented that Cohen and Stewart's speculative approach is useful in exposing errors in conventional thinking, and is "painlessly educative" on the current state of the applicable sciences, but criticized their "naive optimism" with respect to future technological breakthroughs in human space travel.

In his review for Nature, Lawrence M. Krauss admitted to not being completely sure of the book's intended goal and audience, but noted that it may serve as a counterpoint to arguments put forth in Peter Ward and Donald Brownlee's book, Rare Earth.
