= Interdimensional UFO hypothesis =

Idea advanced by Ufologists

The interdimensional UFO hypothesis (IUH) is the proposal that unidentified flying object (UFO) sightings are the result of experiencing other "dimensions" or "portals" that coexist separately alongside our own.

The hypothesis has been advanced by ufologists such as Meade Layne, John Keel, J. Allen Hynek, and Jacques Vallée. Proponents of the interdimensional hypothesis argue that UFOs are a modern manifestation of a phenomenon that has occurred throughout recorded human history, which in prior ages was ascribed to mythological or supernatural creatures.

Jeffrey J. Kripal, Chair in Philosophy and Religious Thought at Rice University, writes: "this interdimensional reading, long a staple of Spiritualism through the famous 'fourth dimension', would have a very long life within ufology and is still very much with us today".

== History ==
=== Pre-modern history ===
Concepts similar to ”other dimensions” exist within some religious and mystical traditions. In Islam, specifically within the mystical tradition of Sufism, the concept al-ghayb refers to the hidden, unseen, and invisible, and encompasses a range of important phenomena within the religion and throughout the everyday lives of Muslims. The concept of a hidden, multilayered reality or world known as 'ālam al-mithāl, or “the world of similitude”, which is considered to be an intermediary realm between the physical world (‘ālam al-shahada) and the purely spiritual world (‘ālam al-malakut), can also be found in Sufistic schools of thought. It is believed that within this dominion exists everything unseen, including intelligent non-human entities, such as the jinn and angels.

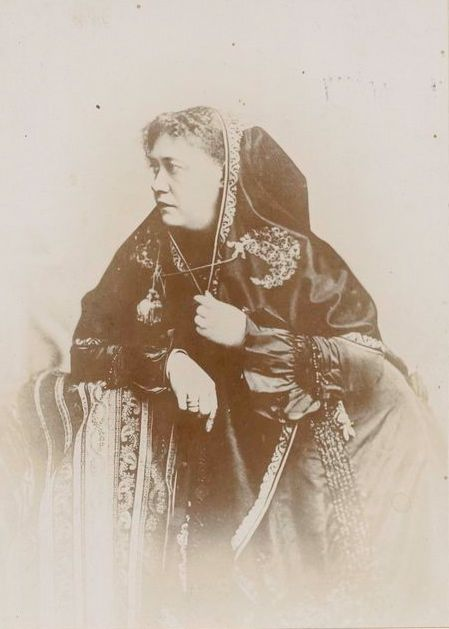
Helena Blavatsky, founder of Theosophy

=== Modern ===
In the 19th century, various spiritualists believed in "other dimensions". In the late 19th century, the metaphysical term "planes" was popularized by H. P. Blavatsky, who propounded a complex cosmology consisting of seven "planes". Blavatsky adapted the word aether from Ancient Greek (via Victorian physics that would later be discredited) into the term "ether", which was subsequently incorporated into the writings of 19th-century occultists.

The "etheric plane" and the "etheric body" were introduced into Theosophy by Charles Webster Leadbeater and Annie Besant to represent a hypothetical "fourth plane", above the "planes" of solids, liquids, and gases. The term "etheric" was later used by popular occult authors Alice Bailey and Rudolf Steiner and also adopted by others.

The first use of the word, as inter-dimensional, is in a novel by Z Gale of 1906. (Note: Gale, Zona. Romance Island. The Bobbs-Merrill Company.: p.173: "As it is" pursued the prince "your people do perfectly understand lifting a square and placing it upon a square or a triangle upon a triangle. But you do not know anything of about placing a cube upon a cube, or a pyramid upon a pyramid so that both occupy the same space at the same time We of Yaque have mastered that principle also" the prince tranquily concluded, "and all that of which is the alphabet. That is why we are able to keep our island unknown to the world - not to say 'invisble' - "But" he said "your Highness, there is not a mathematician in the civilized world who has not considered that problem and cast it aside, with the word that if fourth-dimensional space exists it cannot be inhabited." p.176 "The Fourth dimension is only the beginning. We utilize that to isolate our island. But the higher dimensions are gradually being conquered too. Nearly all of us can pass into the Fifth at will 'disappearing,' as you have the word, from the lower dimensions. - Also we pass at will into the Fifth dimension and even higher, and seem to 'disappear'; the only difference is that, there, we should not yet be able to guide one who did not himself understand how to pass there." p.190 ", as if his was not only the cosmopolitanism that knows no municipal or continental aliens of its own class, but a kind of inter-dimensional cosmopolitanism as well")

== Proponents ==
=== Meade Layne and "Ether Ships" ===
On 4 July 1947, occultist Meade Layne claimed that flying discs were "etheric". Layne, claiming she was in telepathic communication with the "people in the saucers", said "it is possible for objects to pass from an etheric to a dense level of matter" which "then appear to materialize. They then will return to an etheric conditions". Layne further stated that "[t]hese visitors are not excarnate humans but are human beings living in their own world. They come with good intent. They have some idea of experimenting with earth life." The prior year, it had been reported that Layne consulted a medium who relayed communications from a "space ship named Careeta" that came to Earth from "an unidentified planet".

According to one scholar, Layne conceived the term "interdimensional hypostasis" as a means to describe the sightings. Layne is regarded as the earliest proponent of the interdimensional hypothesis.

=== John Keel and "Ultraterrestrials" ===
Ufologist John Keel coined the term "ultraterrestrials" to describe UFO occupants whom he believed to be nonhumans that "exist in a wavelength of energy which we cannot detect".

In his 1970 book UFOs: Operation Trojan Horse, Keel argued that a non-human or spiritual intelligence source had staged whole events over human history in order to propagate and reinforce a patchwork of folkloric covers to camouflage an underlying phenomenon. Keel argued that monsters, ghosts, demons, fairies in the folklore of Middle Europe, vampires, mystery airships in 1897, mystery aeroplanes of the 1930s, mystery helicopters, anomalous creature sightings, poltergeist phenomena, balls of light, and UFOs were, in his view, examples of such covers.

=== Hynek and Vallée ===
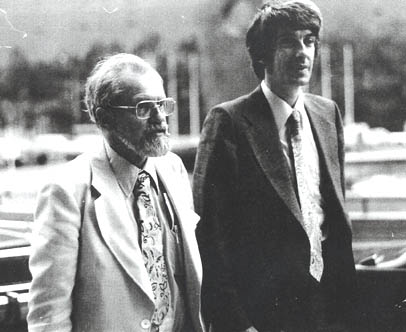
J. Allen Hynek (left) and Jacques Vallée (right)

J. Allen Hynek was an American astronomer who served as scientific advisor to Project Sign, Project Grudge, and Project Blue Book, three UFO studies conducted by the U.S. Air Force. Hynek pioneered the "Close Encounter" classification system, and appeared in a cameo role at the end of Steven Spielberg's Close Encounters of the Third Kind. Jacques Vallée, a student of Hynek's, served as the inspiration for the French researcher portrayed by François Truffaut in the film.

In 1975's The Edge of Reality, Vallée and Hynek consider the possibility of what they call "interlocking universes":

VALLÉE: What other wild hypotheses could we make?
HYNEK: There could be other universe with different quantum rules or vibration rates if you want. Our own space-time continuum could be a cross-section through a universe with many more dimensions. ... Think what a hard time you would have convincing an aborigine that right now, through this room, TV pictures are passing! Yet they're here. You have to have a transducer to see them -- namely a TV set. Well, in the same sense there may be interlocking universes right here! We have this idea of space, we always think of another universe being someplace else. It may not. Maybe it's right here."

In his 1969 book Passport to Magonia: On UFOS, Folklore and Parallel Worlds, Vallée argues for a "parallel universe co-existing with our own". The idea was reiterated in Vallée's subsequent writings. Vallée summarized his objection to the extraterrestrial hypothesis in his 1990 paper "Five Arguments Against the Extraterrestrial Origin of Unidentified Flying Objects":

1. unexplained close encounters are far more numerous than required for any physical survey of the earth;
2. the humanoid body structure of the alleged "aliens" is not likely to have originated on another planet and is not biologically adapted to space travel;
3. the reported behavior in thousands of abduction reports contradicts the hypothesis of genetic or scientific experimentation on humans by an advanced race;
4. the extension of the phenomenon throughout recorded human history demonstrates that UFOs are not a contemporary phenomenon;
5. the apparent ability of UFOs to manipulate space and time suggests radically different and richer alternatives.

== In popular culture ==
The 1984 film The Adventures of Buckaroo Banzai Across the 8th Dimension sees the protagonist drive a vehicle through a mountain of solid rock, only to discover that evil interdimensional aliens live inside Earth's solid matter.

The 2008 action-adventure film Indiana Jones and the Kingdom of the Crystal Skull utilizes the interdimensional hypothesis and describes ancient aliens not flying into space but into ”the space between the spaces".

The 2014 movie Interstellar employs a mix of the interdimensional and time-traveler hypotheses. The bulk-beings who built the tesseract inside the supermassive black hole Gargantua are later revealed to be future humans who have evolved to exist in five dimensions.

== See also ==
- Fallen angel
- Multiverse
- Spiritualism
- String theory

Other hypotheses:

- Demonic UFO hypothesis
- Cryptoterrestrial hypothesis
- Space animal hypothesis
- Time-traveler hypothesis
- Thanatological UFO hypothesis
