= Robert Sheaffer =

American writer and UFO skeptic (born 1949)

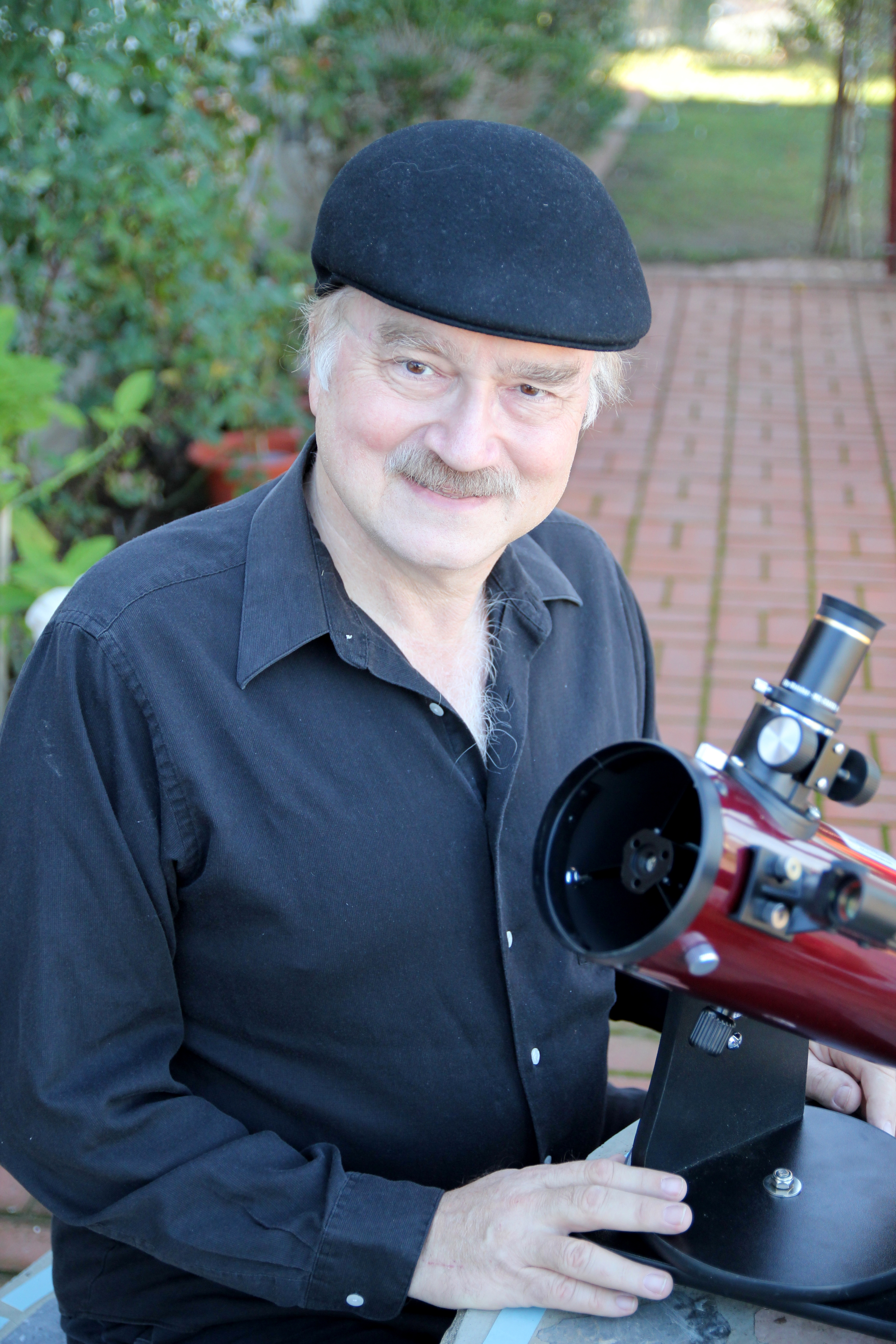
- Sheaffer at home in January 2012
- Born: 1949 (age 76–77); Chicago, Illinois, U.S.
- Education: Northwestern University
- Occupations: Freelance writer, skeptic, author, investigator
- Writing career
- Notable works: UFO Sightings: The Evidence; Psychic Vibrations: Skeptical Giggles from the Skeptical Inquirer
- Website: debunker.com

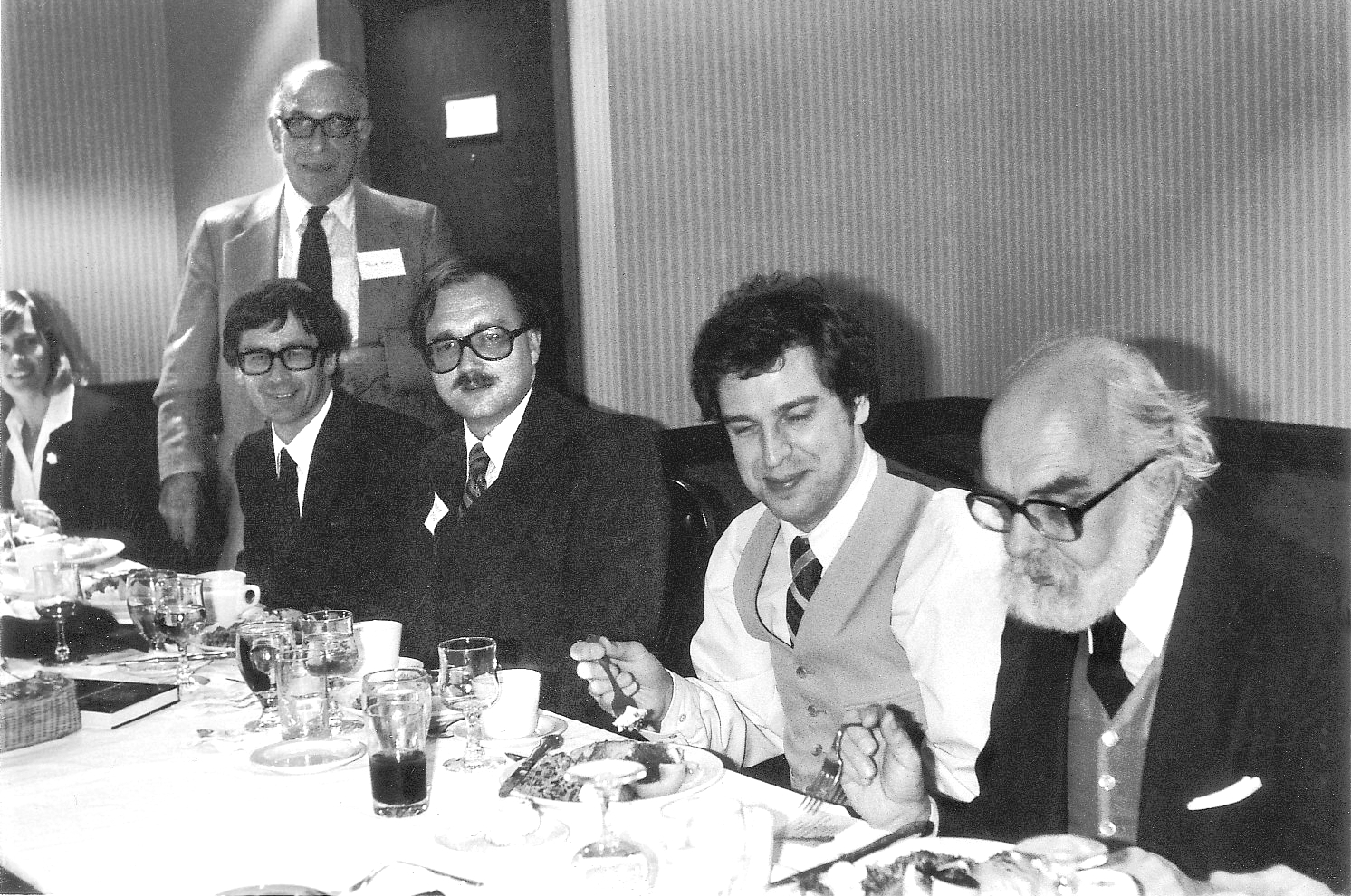
Sheaffer in 1983. From left to right: Pip Smith, Philip J. Klass (standing), Dick Smith, Sheaffer, John Merrell, and James Randi.

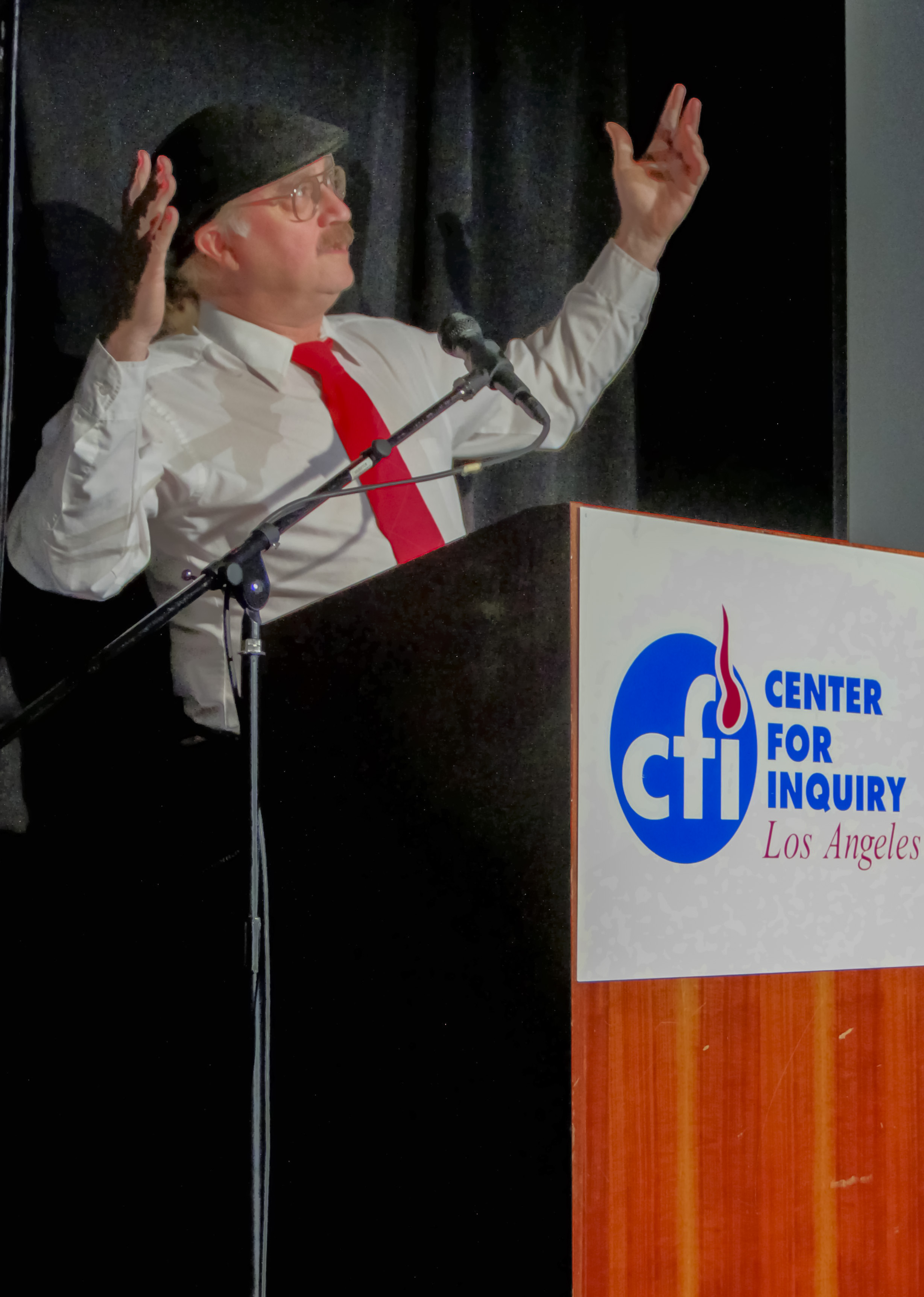
Robert Sheaffer presenting at the IIG awards 2012

Robert Sheaffer (born 1949) is an American freelance writer and UFO skeptic. He is a paranormal investigator of unidentified flying objects, having researched many sightings and written critiques of the hypothesis that UFOs are alien spacecraft. In addition to UFOs, his writings cover topics such as Christianity, academic feminism, the scientific theory of evolution, and creationism. He is the author of six books.

Sheaffer wrote for Skeptical Inquirer (where he contributed the regular "Psychic Vibrations" column), 1977–2017, Fate Magazine, and Spaceflight. He was a founding member (with Philip J. Klass and James Oberg) of the UFO Subcommittee of the Committee for Skeptical Inquiry, and is a former fellow of that organization. He is a graduate of Northwestern University and a member of Mensa.

== Biography ==
Ben Radford in a review of Sheaffer's book Bad UFOs: Critical Thinking About UFO Claims called him an expert on UFOs. Sheaffer has frequently been quoted in the news media regarding UFOs and psychic predictions. Sheaffer was a member of a group called Bay Area Skeptics.

Sheaffer has had a passion for opera since the age of six, and has been taking voice lessons since 1991. He is a tenor and has performed in professional opera productions.

Sheaffer is a member of Mensa International.

== UFO investigation ==
On July 7, 2010, a flight crew preparing to land in Hangzhou's Xiaoshan Airport in China reported a UFO. As a precaution 18 flights were "delayed or redirected". Sheaffer's article in Skeptical Inquirer magazine's November/December 2010 issue is a discussion of how photographs and videos are used. "Reporters want an exciting story, and UFOlogists want to win converts. They will typically grab onto any photo or video that is supposed to represent the object and report as fact practically any claim that is made regardless of its source or veracity." In the case of the Xiaoshan Airport, most of the footage shown was actually taken a year previous to the July 2010 incident.

Interviewed by the Toronto Sun newspaper December 20, 2010, Sheaffer is asked by columnist Thane Burnett to debate UFO enthusiast Chris Rutkowski to "debate the known realities". When asked "Is it reasonable to conclude a UFO – something that was beyond our comprehension and understanding – has ever crashed on Earth?" Sheaffer replies "No, because no one has ever produced any proof of any extraterrestrial technology being retrieved, despite many claims. Talk is cheap, show us the evidence."

On January 10, 2014, a series called Close Encounters debuted on the Discovery Canada channel. The episode recounted a UFO incident that happened at Malmstrom Air Force Base in Montana on March 24, 1967. As Sheaffer summarizes it on his blog, "A bright, glowing orange UFO is allegedly seen over the base by security men, and then the Oscar Flight missiles were said to start going off-line, one by one." Sheaffer's investigation concluded that what the base security men probably saw was the planet Mars. "Whenever witnesses report a bright object in the sky that is red or orange, the first thing to check is whether Mars might have been the culprit.... Mars was only about 3 weeks away from its opposition of April 15, 1967, when it would be directly opposite the sun, and at its maximum brightness." As for the base's missiles going off-line, Sheaffer could find no evidence or paper trail to support that, only the claim of (then) Air Force Lieutenant Robert Salas. Noted UFO researcher Robert Hastings responded to Sheaffer's investigation by dismissing the possibility that the glowing object was Mars. Former SAC missile crew commander Tim Hebert goes further than Sheaffer, stating on his blog "At this point in time there is no supporting documentation or statements from security personnel corroborating the claims for what, if anything, was observed out in the field."

== Conspiracy theories ==
In an interview by Karen Stollznow on Point of Inquiry for May 16, 2011, Sheaffer was asked, "Have any conspiracy theories ever turned out to be correct, or is a 'true conspiracy theory' really something else?" He replied, "Conspiracies occur all the time. ... organized crime is a conspiracy. ... there was a conspiracy to kill President Lincoln ... Real conspiracies do exist, but not grand conspiracies. ... [in which] The Masons are planning this or, you know, there's there's always some shadowy group who you can't really point to or you can't really say who's involved".

== X-Files ==
The twentieth episode of the third season of the X-Files television series, entitled "Jose Chung's From Outer Space", referenced Robert Sheaffer.

== Speaking engagements ==
He spoke at the "Where Are They" symposium at the University of Maryland, November 1979.

He spoke at the "Animal Mutilations, Star Maps, UFOs and Television" session of the "Science, Skepticism and the Paranormal" conference put on by CSICOP in 1983.

He spoke at the "UFOs: The Space-Age Mythology" CSI workshop in 2009.

He was on the panel of the "UFO Claims" session at CSICon, a conference put on by the Committee for Skeptical Inquiry, in 2011.

Sheaffer was one of the leaders of a workshop on "Preserving Skeptic History" at The Amazing Meeting in 2013.

== Bibliography ==
- Sheaffer, Robert (1980). The UFO Verdict: Examining the Evidence. Buffalo, N.Y: Prometheus Books. ISBN 0-87975-338-2.
- Sheaffer, Robert (1988). Resentment Against Achievement: Understanding The Assault Upon Ability. Buffalo, N.Y: Prometheus Books. ISBN 0-87975-447-8.
- Sheaffer, Robert (1991). The Making of the Messiah: Christianity and Resentment. Buffalo, N.Y: Prometheus Books. ISBN 0-87975-691-8.
- Sheaffer, Robert (1998). UFO Sightings: The Evidence. Buffalo, N.Y: Prometheus Books. ISBN 1-57392-213-7.
- Sheaffer, Robert (2011). Psychic Vibrations: Skeptical Giggles from the Skeptical Inquirer. Create Space. ISBN 978-1-4636-0157-7.
- Sheaffer, Robert (2016). Bad UFOs: Critical Thinking About UFO Claims. CreateSpace Independent Publishing. p. 292. ISBN 978-1519260840.
