= Close encounter =

Alleged encounter with a UFO or its occupants

In ufology, a close encounter is an event in which a person witnesses an unidentified flying object (UFO) at relatively close range, where the possibility of misidentification is presumably greatly reduced. This terminology and the system of classification behind it were first suggested in the American astronomer and UFO researcher J. Allen Hynek's book The UFO Experience: A Scientific Inquiry (1972). Categories beyond Hynek's original three have been added by others but have not gained universal acceptance, mainly because they lack the scientific rigor that Hynek aimed to bring to ufology.

Distant sightings more than 150 meters (500 ft) from the witness are classified as daylight discs, nocturnal lights, or radar/visual reports. Sightings within about 150 meters (500 ft) are sub-classified as various types of close encounters. Hynek and others argued that a claimed close encounter must occur within about 150 meters (500 ft) to greatly reduce or eliminate the possibility of misidentifying conventional aircraft or other known phenomena.

Hynek's scale became well known after being referenced in the classic sci-fi film Close Encounters of the Third Kind (1977), which is named after the third level of the scale. Promotional posters for the film featured the three levels of the scale, and Hynek himself makes a cameo appearance near the end of the film.

== Hynek's scale ==
=== Main scale ===
Hynek devised a sixfold classification for UFO sightings. The six levels are arranged according to increasing proximity:

| Number | Title | Description |
|---|---|---|
| 1 | Nocturnal lights | Lights in the night sky. |
| 2 | Daylight discs | UFOs seen in the daytime, generally having discoidal or ovoid shapes. |
| 3 | Radar-visual | UFO reports that have radar confirmation—these supposedly try to offer harder evidence that the objects are real, although radar propagation can be occasionally discredited due to atmospheric propagation anomalies. |
| 4 | Close encounters of the first kind (CE1) | Visual sightings of an unidentified flying object, seemingly less than 500 feet (150 m) away, that show an appreciable angular extension and considerable detail. |
| 5 | Close encounters of the second kind (CE2) | A UFO event in which a physical effect is alleged; this can be interference in the functioning of a vehicle or electronic device, some physical trace like impressions in the ground, scorched or otherwise affected vegetation, a chemical trace, animals reacting, or a physiological effect such as paralysis, heat, or discomfort in the witness. |
| 6 | Close encounters of the third kind (CE3) | UFO encounters in which an animated entity is present—these include humanoids, robots, and humans who seem to be occupants or pilots of a UFO. |

Close encounters of the third kind (CE3) may imply first contact.

=== Bloecher subtypes ===
UFO researcher Ted Bloecher proposed six sub-types for the close encounters of the third kind in Hynek's scale:

1. Aboard: an entity is observed only inside the UFO.
2. Both: an entity is observed inside and outside the UFO.
3. Close: an entity is observed near to a UFO, but not going in or out.
4. Direct: an entity is observed—no UFOs are seen by the observer, but UFO activity has been reported in the area at about the same time.
5. Excluded: an entity is observed, but no UFOs are seen and no UFO activity has been reported in the area at that time.
6. Frequence: no entity or UFOs are observed, but the subject experiences some sort of "intelligent communication".

== Vallée's extensions ==
After Hynek's death in 1986, his colleague Jacques Vallée extended Hynek's classification system by two steps, specifically close encounters of the fourth and fifth kinds, as published in Vallée's book Confrontations: A Scientist's Search for Alien Contact (1990). The Mutual UFO Network (MUFON) immediately adopted the extensions to the classification scale and has used them ever since.

=== Close encounters of the fourth kind (CE4) ===
A close encounter of the fourth kind is a UFO event in which a human is abducted by a UFO or its occupants. This type was not included in Hynek's original close encounters scale. Hynek's former associate Jacques Vallée argued that a CE4 should describe not only abductions, but also encounters that lead to a shift in the experiencer's perception of reality. The title of the film The Fourth Kind (2009) makes reference to this category.

=== Close encounters of the fifth kind (CE5) ===
As stated in Vallée's Confrontations (1990), a close encounter of the fifth kind is where an alien abductee receives some manner of physical effect from their close encounter, typically either injury or healing. Several years after Vallée's classification updates, some preferred that a close encounter of the fifth kind instead refer to human-initiated contact with extraterrestrial life forms or advanced interstellar civilizations, claiming direct communication between aliens and humans. This alternate interpretation of what a close encounter of the fifth kind (CE5) should represent has been attributed to Steven M. Greer. While technically not an extension of the Vallée scale that measures result-oriented data, this replacement of the originally coined CE5 classification has become popular in marketing human-initiated contact events. In a CE5 event, individuals or groups use specific protocols to establish communication or interaction with extraterrestrial beings. These protocols primarily involve the use of contact meditation and the use of sounds or signals. Close encounters of the fifth kind are also referred to as human-initiated close encounters.

== Other extensions ==
Tim Mendham of Australian Skeptics has noted two further common extensions to the scale, namely close encounters of the sixth and seventh kinds, which relate to bodily harm or hybridization respectively. Their recognition has gained some traction in ufology, in spite of not having gained universal acceptance. Recognition of these additions has also extended to writings outside of ufology, including the tongue-in-cheek work The Ultimate Worst-Case Scenario Survival Handbook, which also makes mention of these extensions, as well as a particularly tongue-in-cheek chapter in a book on the history of measurements and scales titled The Long and the Short of It: How We Came to Measure Our World. Tim Mendham elaborated on these extensions at the end of an article focusing on skeptics Robert Sheaffer and Philip J. Klass, specifically noting that a CE6 incident was defined as one where "a person or animal dies during the close encounter with a UFO", while a CE7 incident was defined as one where "a hybrid being (human/UFO occupant) is generated as result of the close encounter".

== See also ==
- Contactee
- First contact (science fiction)
- Identification studies of UFOs
- List of reported UFO sightings
- Narrative of the abduction phenomenon

== Bibliography ==
- Prothero, Donald R.; Callaghan, Timothy D. (2017). UFOs, chemtrails, and aliens: what science says. Bloomington, Indiana: Indiana University Press. ISBN 978-0-253-02692-7.
- "Close Encounters with Extra-terrestrials". h2g2. 25 April 2010 [19 May 2003]. Archived from the original on 24 December 2025.
- Casteel, Sean. "C.D.B. Bryan of "Close Encounters Of The Fourth Kind"". Archived from the original on 28 June 2007.
- "close encounters". The Worlds of David Darling. Archived from the original on 5 February 2007.
- "Hynek Classification System". SCIFI.com. Archived from the original on 21 March 2007.
- Naisbitt, Michael (22 October 2007). "Defining a "Close Encounter"". UFO.Whipnet.org. Archived from the original on 5 February 2011.
- "Close encounter". The Black Vault Encyclopedia Project. Archived from the original on 18 June 2008.
- Däniken, Erich von (1972). Chariots of the Gods. Berkley Publishing Group. ISBN 0-425-16680-5.
