= 1947 flying disc craze =

Reports of unidentified flying objects in 1947

In 1947, from June to July, a rash of reported sightings of unidentified flying objects (UFOs) in the United States were widely publicized by the news media. The craze began on June 24, when media nationwide reported civilian pilot Kenneth Arnold's story of witnessing disc-shaped objects which headline writers dubbed "Flying Saucers". Such reports quickly spread throughout the United States; historians would later chronicle at least 800 "copycat" reports in subsequent weeks, while other sources estimate the reports may have numbered in the thousands.

Reports peaked on July 7. After numerous hoaxes and mistaken identifications, the disc reports largely subsided by July 10. Mainstream sources speculated that the disc reports were caused by novel technology, mistaken identifications, or mass hysteria. By contrast, fringe speculation held that the discs might have come from other planets or other dimensions; still others suggested the discs were occult or might signify the end of the world.

The 1947 craze has been extensively studied within the frameworks of both folklore studies and religious studies, where it is regarded by scholars as the "birth of a modern myth".

== Overview ==
If people saw chimaeras back in the days when Greek mythology was being born, it should not be wondered at that people are seeing supersonic discs in this Flash Gordon era.

— Denver Post (July 3, 1947)

In late June 1947, the press in the United States began covering reports of flying discs. Reports increased, with a sharp rise on July 4; over the course of the next five days, there were widespread reports throughout the entirety of the United States. Reports crested on July 7, gradually diminishing over the subsequent week, amid numerous hoaxes, pranks, and mistaken identifications.

The flying saucer craze of 1947 was thoroughly and widely covered in media nationwide, with some contemporary observers interpreting the disc sightings as 'modern folklore'. On July 3, midway through the craze, the Denver Post opined: "Even before Plato, scholars were perplexed by what is real and what isn't...Finally Descartes came along with the theory that 'whatever I apprehend clearly and distinctly is true' and on the basis of such authority it seems unimportant whether people actually saw the discs or only thought they did...If people saw chimaeras back in the days when Greek mythology was being born, it should not be wondered at that people are seeing supersonic discs in this Flash Gordon era."

In 2020, Religious Studies professor David J. Halpern similarly argued "UFOs are a myth – but myths are real." Howard Henry Peckham opined: "The 'flying saucers' may have been a hoax, imagination, illusion, mirages, phantoms of preposterous eyesight, et al, yet they caused a phenomenon reverberations of which were heard around the world."

The 1947 craze has long been of interest to scholars of folklore studies. Halpern argues that "The power and fascination of the UFO has nothing to do with space travel or life on other planets. It's about us, our longings and terrors". Roland Barthes, a 'founding father' of cultural studies, recalled "The mystery of flying saucers was at first entirely terrestrial: we suspected that the saucers came from the Soviet netherworld, from this world as devoid of clear intentions as another planet." Folklorist Gordon Arnold similarly writes: "Many aspects of the great flying saucer wave raise questions about human behavior and America's social, cultural, and political inclinations".

Ted Bloecher argued that the 1947 craze is "the most fascinating of any to examine because of its unique position at the very beginning" of flying saucer folklore. Writes Bloecher: "There were no 'attitudes' about UFOs in June 1947. There were no preconceptions, no misconceptions, no 'policies' by either press or public, or by any official agencies". Folklorist Howard Henry Peckham similarly argued that "students of folklore have had a rare opportunity to witness the birth and development of a modern myth – the 'flying saucers'".

== Background ==
By 1947, US national security concerns led to unprecedented scrutiny of airspace near US atomic sites and increased media coverage of UFO reports in US airspace.

=== 1940s weapons development ===
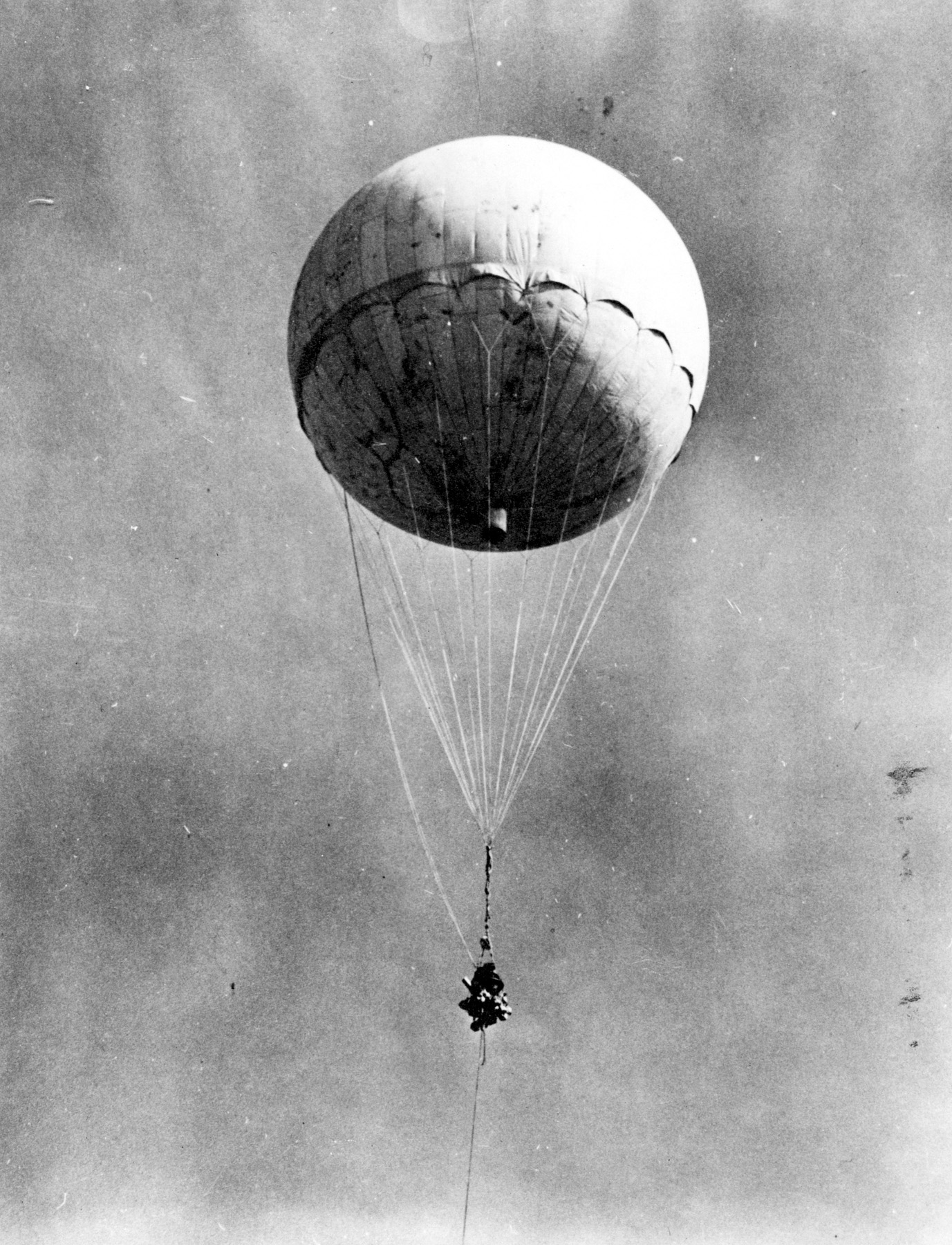
A balloon bomb launched from Japan briefly interfered with plutonium production at Hanford. A coverup prevented Japan from learning the balloons had reached the US.

Atomic weapons were developed by the US Military during World War Two as a part of the Manhattan Project. Uranium enrichment was performed at Oak Ridge, Tennessee, while plutonium production took place at Hanford, Washington. Bomb design and construction took place at Los Alamos, New Mexico. As a result, air power had increased greatly in both lethality and range over the course of World War Two: At the 1941 Pearl Harbor attack, 350 Japanese aircraft killed 2,500 people in a sneak attack after flying a few hundred miles, but by the 1945 bombings of Hiroshima and Nagasaki, just two American bombers killed up to 250,000 people after flying a full 1,500 miles.

During the war, Japan deployed intercontinental balloon bombs that started wildfires and in one case even took out power at the Hanford plutonium production facility; a domestic censorship campaign successfully prevented Japan from learning the weapons had, in fact, reached the United States. Inspired by the Japanese balloons, the US created their own high-flying balloons in Project Mogul, an attempt to detect potential Soviet atomic tests.

Meanwhile, Germany had developed rockets, jet fighters, and designs for an intercontinental bomber. Soviet and American governments both learned of Axis technical advances and employed Axis scientists in their race for technical superiority after the war.

=== Increased scrutiny of US airspace ===
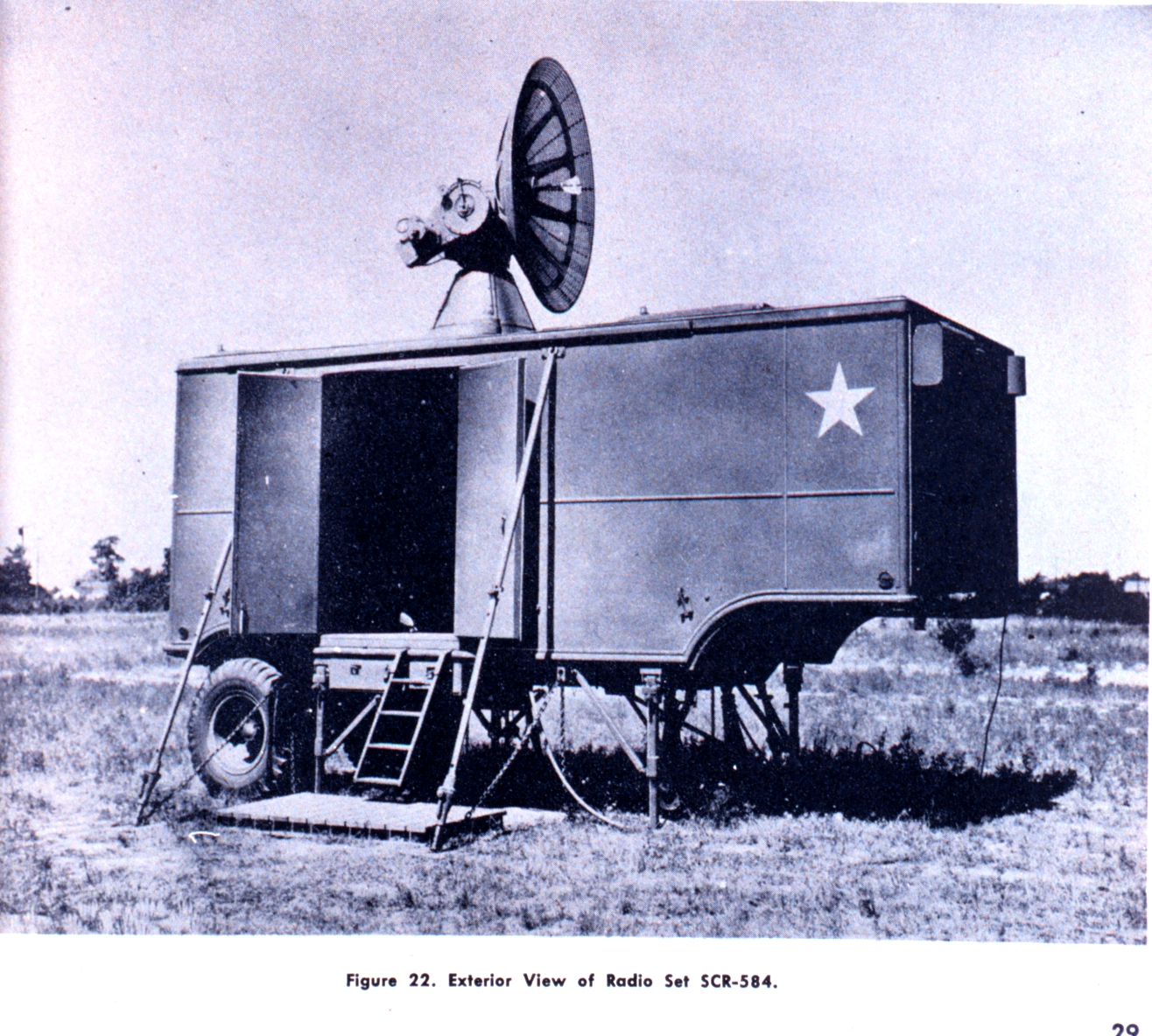
1940s-era US radar equipment

Direct US atomic attack against Soviets had been a possibility since 1945, when the nation unveiled the first intercontinental bomber, able to reach the Soviet Union from American soil. By 1946, Army officials feared a Soviet surprise attack on US atomic facilities. Soviet bombers had developed the range to strike Hanford and still return to base, or even to strike Los Alamos or Oak Ridge in a one-way attack. Atomic sites were among the first places in the United States to operate radar, supported by spotters for visual confirmation and squadrons of fighters to defend against potential threats.

The start of the Cold War in the summer of 1947 affected how media covered reports of unidentified things in the sky. In earlier eras, such reports were covered as religion, folklore, or tall tales, but the development of atomic weapons and intercontinental vehicles meant even a small number of adversarial overflights could have huge national security implications. Writing in 2020, Skeptical Inquirer author Eric Wojciechowski argued: "From all the available evidence, it appears that in 1947, the U.S. military was accepting anecdotal reports of flying saucers at face value. Perhaps they did so as a precaution to ensure no foreign threats were present. Missing something such as advanced enemy aircraft over one’s own territory could have been disastrous."

In Mid-April 1947, meteorologist Walter A. Minczewski and his staff at a Richmond Virginia station released a balloon and were tracking it when they observed a silver, ellipsoidal object just below it. The object appeared to be flat on bottom and domed on tope. The observed it via theodolite for fifteen seconds.

== Events of Summer 1947 ==
Animation of reports during the flying disc craze

The year 1947 was marked by renewed tensions between the Soviet Union and the United States. On March 13, American president Harry Truman pledged to contain the communist uprisings in Greece and Turkey. More generally, the Truman Doctrine implied American support for other nations thought to be threatened by Soviet communism.

On April 16, statesman Bernard Baruch coined the term "Cold War" to describe relations between the United States and the Soviet Union.

Having lost 27 million people in the war, the Soviet Union pushed for returning Germany to a pastoral state without heavy industry. Despite Soviet objections, on June 5, Secretary of State George Marshall announced a comprehensive program of American assistance to reindustrialize European nations.

The summer of 1947 featured widespread publications about atomic energy and war. On June 27, retired Supreme Court Justice Owen Roberts warned the US was headed "down the old familiar road of appeasement" towards "An all-out shooting World War III". On June 30, Albert Einstein and fellow scientists warned of a possible atomic war within a decade. A three-week conference about radioactive chemicals in medicine began at the University of California in San Francisco. On July 1, Representative John Dingell criticized hosting of German atomic scientists in places like El Paso.

=== Initial reports ===
June 25 - Kenneth Arnold sighting near Mount Rainier

On June 24, 1947, private pilot Kenneth Arnold claimed that he saw a string of nine shiny unidentified flying objects flying past Mount Rainier at speeds that Arnold estimated at a minimum of 1,200 miles an hour (1,932 km/h). This was the first post-World War II sighting in the United States that garnered nationwide news coverage and is credited with being the first of the modern era of UFO sightings, including numerous reported sightings over the next two to three weeks. Arnold's description of the objects also led to the press quickly coining the terms flying saucer and flying disc as popular descriptive terms for UFOs.

When Arnold landed in Yakima, he described what he had seen to a number of pilot friends, who suggested that maybe he had seen guided missiles or a new airplane being secretly developed by the United States Army. After refueling, he continued on his way to an air show in Pendleton, Oregon. He was first interviewed by reporters the next day (June 25), when he went to the office of the East Oregonian in Pendleton. Any skepticism the reporters might have harbored evaporated when they interviewed Arnold at length, as historian Mike Dash records:

Arnold had the makings of a reliable witness. He was a respected businessman and experienced pilot...and seemed to be neither exaggerating what he had seen, nor adding sensational details to his report. He also gave the impression of being a careful observer...These details impressed the newspapermen who interviewed him and lent credibility to his report.

External audio
- Kenneth Arnold radio interview, June 1947

The following day, Arnold was interviewed on the radio about his sighting and his story was published in afternoon and evening editions of regional papers. By June 26, Arnold's story was being widely reported throughout the United States.

==== Additional reports ====
June 26 - Reports from Oregon, Missouri, and Oklahoma

Arnold's report was the first of many. On June 26, press reported that Byron Savage of Oklahoma City had seen a flying disc about six weeks prior. That same day, press reported that a Kansas City carpenter named W. I. Davenport recalled having seen nine discs while working on a roof the prior Wednesday. Also on June 26, photographer E.H. Sprinkle of Eugene, Oregon reported having attempted to take a photograph of a formation of nine bright objects in the prior weeks.

==== Pacific Northwest reports amid jet speculation ====
June 27 saw reports of past sightings from a housewife in Bremerton, a home-builder in Bellingham, a motorist and his family from Wenatachee, a couple from Salem, and a woman from Yakima.

On June 28, press nationwide reported the opinion of Army rocket expert Lt. Col. Harold R. Turner, who speculated the "discs" were jet airplanes; Turner explained that "the jet planes' circular exhaust glows brightly when heated and might easily appear to be discs at a distance.

Also on June 28, original disc witness Kenneth Arnold publicly criticized the lack of any official investigation into his sighting. Said Arnold: "If I was running the country and someone reported something unusual, I'd certainly want to know more about it."

==== Reports throughout the West ====
On June 28, the Denver Post reported on a crew of seven railway workers in Colorado Springs who claimed to have seen a disc the prior May. Also on June 28, press covered reports from a mother and son in Seattle, three airport employees in Cedar City, a family near Boise, an optometrist in El Paso, a dentist in Silver City and a railroad engineer in Joliet; all claimed to have seen discs.

==== Potential explanations offered ====
June 29 - Washington, Oregon, and Texas experience further reports, while British Columbia and Arizona see their first reports.

Lt. Col. Harold R. Turner of the White Sands Proving Ground publicly initially speculated the discs "must have been" jet airplanes but later told press that the New Mexico flying disc reports were the result of meteorites. On June 28, Washington-based ironworks operator Ray Taro speculated that the "flying discs" were caused by his foundry, which had been melting bottlecaps, expelling "little aluminum discs" which were blown out of the foundry smoke stacks. On June 28, Oklahoma sightings were revealed as handbills released from an airplane.

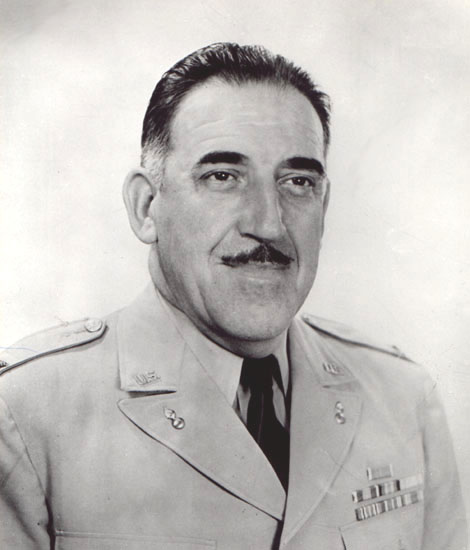
Col. Harold R. Turner, commander of the White Sands Proving Ground, speculated the reports were caused by rockets or meteors.

By June 29, one source reported that "These discs, some people suggest, may presage an invasion from Mars." Others suggested the discs were Russian weapons, akin to the incendiary balloons released by the Japanese to cross the Pacific and explode in the US. Speculation suggested that the Navy's experimental Flying Flapjack might be responsible for disc sightings. On June 30, one Oregon preacher suggested that the discs were "the 'advance guard' of universal disaster, heralding the end of the world".

On July 1, Air Force intelligence officer Col. Alfred Kalberer and astronomer Oscar Monnig briefed press to provide reassurance that "we're not being invaded by little platter-like planes from Mars". Monnig described the sightings as "an interesting study in human psychology", arguing that after upon hearing Arnold's initial report, a colleague laughed and predicted "Watch the reports pour in now, from all across the country, from people who will imagine they have seen these things, too". Kalberer cited the Orson Welles broadcast and the May 1947 Tokyo Sea Monster broadcast. Kalberer joked that he wished "someone would put salt on the tail of one of these discs and catch it like our grandmothers used to tell us to do if we wished to catch a bird", adding "They're such friendly little discs. They seem to flip around and do all sorts of kittenish antics".

Also on July 1, headlines like "Flying Disc Deal 'Solved'" reported that a flying disc had been recovered in New Mexico after a local man chased the object until it landed. The object was identified as a "five by eight inch piece of tinfoil". In San Angelo, on July 2 the press relayed a report from Ivy T. Young who speculated that his hobby of releasing silvery balloons with his name attached may have been responsible for the disc sightings.

=== Increasing prominence ===
From June 24 to July 1, official response was one of skepticism and humor; that changed during the first week of July, when reports from reputable witnesses prompted further reactions and investigations.

==== Lt. Governor sighting followed by official investigation ====
On July 2, Idaho Lt. Governor Donald S. Whitehead revealed publicly that both he and Boise Justice J.M. Lampert had witnessed objects on June 24, the day of Arnold's sighting. The next day, papers nationwide reported that Lt. Gen. Nathan Twining, commander of Wright Field, had announced that Air Material Command had opened a probe into the discs. Twining claimed that a "reputable scientist" had seen the disc-like objects in flight. Twining urged all persons seeing the strange objects in flight to contact Wright Field.

That day, headlines proclaimed "U.S. Stops 'Laughing Off' Stories of Flying Discs", quoting an Army Air Force spokesman as saying "If some foreign power is sending flying discs over the United States, it is our responsibility to know about it and take proper action". Army experts acknowledged that they could not explain the disc and reported having checked research authorities and contractors, none of whom knew anything concrete about the discs. They suggested the discs might be the product of a civilian inventor.

The Idaho Statesman quoted an unnamed military officer as saying he thought the air forces and FBI had been showing "complacency" by not pushing for a more "vigorous investigation". It also reported that Kenneth Arnold has not been contacted by military or the FBI about his sighting. The Statesman quoted the FBI special agent in charge of the area's FBI force, W.G. Banister, who reported "I don't know any more about it than what I read in the newspapers."

==== San Francisco fireworks and stories of landings ====
On July 3, press nationwide reported a story from California Highway Patrol Sergeant David Menary who told of seeing six large metallic discs dive into the San Francisco Bay at high speed the prior day. Menary had been accompanied by Walter Castro, a garage owner. On July 3, US Army major Steve Monroe of the Presidio issued a report explaining that Menary's sighting had been caused by 'some of the boys' experimenting with fireworks. Monroe announced further such experiments would be cancelled.

On July 3, press announced a "mystery missile" had been seen in Altadena, California and was believed to have landed nearby; the witness stated that object "was NOT [sic] a 'flying disc'". That same day, press reported on a potential landing in San Miguel.

==== July 4 press reports ====
By July 4, reports had spread to 11 states and two Canadian provinces, with new sightings reported in Delaware. Headlines declared the recent investigation had finished: "Army Air Forces Drops Inquiry Into Mysterious 'Flying Discs'; Maybe They're Just Imaginary". An Army Air Force spokesman explained that the inquiry "has not produced enough fact to warrant further investigation".

Also on July 4, the United Press quoted Meade Layne, a publisher of an occult magazine, who speculated that the discs were "etheric". Alternatively, the San Francisco Chronicle published a letter from local eccentric Ole J. Sneide who claimed that the discs were "oblate spheroid space ships" who "have been absent from our planet since before the fall of the Roman Empire, when the Great Master left earth for the outer galaxy by fohatic [sic] teleportation."

External image
- Frank Ryman photograph

That same day, it was reported that Frank Ryman, a Coast Guard yeoman in Seattle, had photographed a disc. Also on July 4, it was reported that eight military men were hospitalized with burns after an acid accident at White Sands under Lt. Col. Harold B. Turner.

==== Flight 105 ====
Flight 105 departed Boise bound for Pendleton.

On the evening of July 4, United Airlines Flight 105 took off from Boise, Idaho in a DC-3 bound for Pendleton, Oregon. In a sign of the times, on departure Boise tower jokingly suggested the crew "be on the lookout for 'flying saucers'".

During the flight, the crew reportedly observed "four or five 'somethings'", described as "smooth on the bottom and rough appearing on top", but they could not say whether they were "oval or saucer-like". One object was reportedly larger than the rest. The crew later witnessed what they interpreted as four additional objects.

==== Group sightings ====
The Flight 105 sighting was widely publicized on July 5. Also on July 5, papers reported a group of 60 picnickers in Twin Falls Park had witnessed 35 discs over a twenty-minute period the prior day. Police in Portland received reports of discs, some reports coming from members of local law enforcement in Portland and Vancouver; the International News Service reported that "hundreds of persons" viewed the strange objects, up to 20 in number. At Hayden Lake, Idaho, a group of 200 people were said to witness a disc for thirty minutes. Six people in Boise reported seeing discs the previous day.

On July 5, it was reported that a balloon and a six-pointed, star-shaped tinfoil object was recovered in Pickaway County, Ohio by farmer Sherman Campbell; the press speculated the object may have been responsible for recent local 'flying saucer' reports.

Also on July 5, press reported on the disappearance of an Army C-54 transport plane. The plane went missing after departing Bermuda bound for West Palm Beach with six men aboard. Years later, the disappearance and flying discs would be incorporated into the Bermuda Triangle folklore.

Wire service reports quoted astronomer Oliver J. Lee of the Dearborn Observatory as suggesting the discs were "probably man-made and radio controlled". Human behavioral expert John. G. Lynn blamed the "wave of saucer hysteria" on "recent predictions that an atomic war would break out, laying waste the United States". A Louisiana paper quoted physicist Norris Sill, a member of the Navy staff at the Bikini tests, as discounting the suggestion that nuclear fission was causing the sightings, saying there was "no plausible connection between the two".

==== Atomic link claimed ====
By July 6, national media speculated that disc reports were linked to atomic sites, such as the Hanford plutonium plant, Muroc Army Airfield, and the White Sands Proving Ground (site of the Trinity Test and Holloman base).

During the 1947 craze, flying discs and atomic weaponry became linked in the public consciousness. On July 6, headlines proclaimed "Discs Atom Products, A-Bomb Scientist Says". Articles cited an unnamed "noted scientist in nuclear physics" affiliated with CalTech who had been part of the Manhattan Project. The scientist declared "People are not 'seeing things'" and 'said flatly that experiments in "transmutation of atomic energy" being conducted at Muroc Lake Calif; White Sands, N.M.; Portland Ore., and elsewhere are responsible for the "flying discs". Papers observed that the "Bulk of the flying disc reports have generated in a wide circle through Idaho, Washington, and Oregon surrounding the Hanford works". Col. F. J. Clarke, commander of Hanford, denied knowledge of any connection. Harold Urey, atomic scientist in Chicago, dismissed the report as "gibberish", as did Atomic Energy Commission chair David E. Lilienthal.

The Associated Press reported that fighters had been placed on alert at Muroc Army Airfield and Portland, Oregon—two hotspots of reports in the prior weeks. By July 6, reports had spread to 31 states. Louis E. Starr, the national commander of the Veterans of Foreign Wars, called for more information about the discs, declaring that "Too little is being told to the people of this country". In Acampo, California, reports of an airborne light and sounds "like a four-motored bomber with props feathered for takeoff" were speculated to be linked to a local power outage.

==== Reports peak ====
By July 7, the Los Angeles Times proclaimed: "Flying 'Whatsits' Supplant Weather as No. 1 Topic Anywhere People Meet". That day, newspapers announced that reports "poured in" from the San Francisco Bay. Berkeley professor Raymond Thayer Birge reassured the public that the discs "aren't coming from outer space". Army pilots began flying "camera patrols" as 11 planes were equipped with telescopic cameras in the hopes of capturing images of a flying disc.

Also on July 7, press reported the account of Vernon Baird, who claimed to have seen a 'Flying Yo-Yo' over Montana. Baird, a civilian pilot working work for a mapping firm, reported the object "came apart like a clamshell. The two pieces spiraled down somewhere in the Madison Range". Baird described seeing similar objects darting around "like a batch of molecules doing the rumba." Later that day, it was reported that Baird had admitted the entire story was false.

One recovered disc was revealed to be a circular saw blade with tubes and wires attached, while a second disc turned out to be locomotive packing washers.

Retired general Hap Arnold (no relation) publicly speculated the discs had either been developed by United States scientists or were foreign technology that "operating out of control". The Los Angeles Examiner received and publicized a letter claiming the discs were atomic-powered Russian planes.

Winfred Overholser, a nationally renowned psychiatrist, described the reports as a "national hysteria". In contrast, Harry A. Steckel, psychiatric consultant to the Veterans Administration, dismissed the "mass hysteria" explanation, adding that the disc might be the result of "experiments by unknown government agencies".

On July 7, it was reported than an Army weather kite was found on a farm near Granville, Ohio. Truman returned to Washington after a weekend in Charlottesville, driving himself most of the way, with police escort.

Also on July 7, it was reported that the FBI was investigating a letter received by the Los Angeles Examiner which claimed the discs were atomic-powered Russian craft. The Examiner turned the letter over to authorities after a recommendation by a "top-flight atomic scientist" who appraised the letter as "not all nonsense".

=== Weather balloons, pranks, and hoaxes ===
Hoaxed discs
- Harston with a hoaxed disc from Shreveport
- Rev. Joseph Brasky of Grafton, Wisconsin poses with hoax disc
- Kemper disc of York, PA
- Morfitt disc of Victoria, B.C.

On July 8, United Press reported that Soviet Vice Counsel Eugene Tunantzev denied responsibility for the discs, saying that "Russia respects the sovereignty of all governments and by no stretch of the imagination would use another country for a proving ground." American officials agreed, dismissing speculation that the discs might be 'secret weapons of use in bacteriological warfare'. $1,000 rewards were offered in three different parts of the country: in Los Angeles, the "World Inventors' Exposition" announced a $1,000 reward for a 'flying disc' by the end of the week. Similar rewards were offered by entrepreneur E.J. Culligan of Northbrook Illinois and the Spokane Athletic Round Table, described as a 'group of gagsters'. On July 8, papers ran comments by White House press secretary Charles G. Ross who jokingly shared a telegram from a professional juggler who reported the "saucers" were things used in his act that "got out of hand". Pulitzer-prize winning journalist Hal Boyle authored a satirical report from inside a flying saucer.

On July 8, it was reported that Norman Hargrave reported finding an object containing the inscription "Military secret of the United States of America". Another unsubstantiated story was circulated of a disc being recovered on the Texas Gulf coast. Flying disc reports spread to Sydney, Australia, Johannesburg, South Africa, and Copenhagen, Denmark. Sightings were reported in Saanich, B.C. In Victoria, B.C., a palm-sized disc was photographed and turned over to police by Arthur Morfitt, who said the disc landed near him.

By July 8, reports had spread to 41 states. Science-fiction author and Fortean R. DeWitt Miller compared the current craze to 19th-century folklore, speculating the discs were either a new weapon, interplanetary, or else "things out of other dimensions of time and space". Newspaper and radio firebrand Walter Winchell cited DeWitt's book "Forgotten Mysteries", highlighting three 19th-century reports that Winchell alleged were similar to the ongoing disc craze.

Tobacco salesman Lloyd Bennet, of Oelwein, Iowa, claimed to have found a 6.5-inch diameter disc in his front yard. Frances Adams of Austin similarly recovered a disc which was photographed and publicized. F.G. 'Happy' Harston, a Shreveport auto salesman, recovered a 16-inch aluminum disc thrown by pranksters. Thomas W. Wilson, also of Shreveport, chased a "disc" which was revealed to be a balloon.

John Caldwell, of Austin TX, reported seeing a disc and also shared having seen a mysterious aircraft 57 years prior; Caldwell dismissed both as illusions. On July 8, celebrity Orson Welles publicly denied any connection to the flying discs, saying "I scared the shirts off Americans once. That was enough."

Media reported on rumors that a disc had crashed near Lancaster, CA, setting fifteen or 20 tree afire; ranch owner Fritz Godde denied the reports.

External image
- Albert Weaver photograph

Media compared the ongoing craze to the unexplained fireballs reported in May and June 1945 over Japan, beginning with the May 23 night raid of Tokyo.

July 8 saw the first publication of a flying disc photograph, captured by Albert Weaver of Michigan. Also on July 8, press ran a photo of three prominent disc observers, Kenneth Arnold, E.J. Smith, and Ralph Stephens, who had gathered to "compare notes on the 'flying discs'"

==== Roswell debris ====
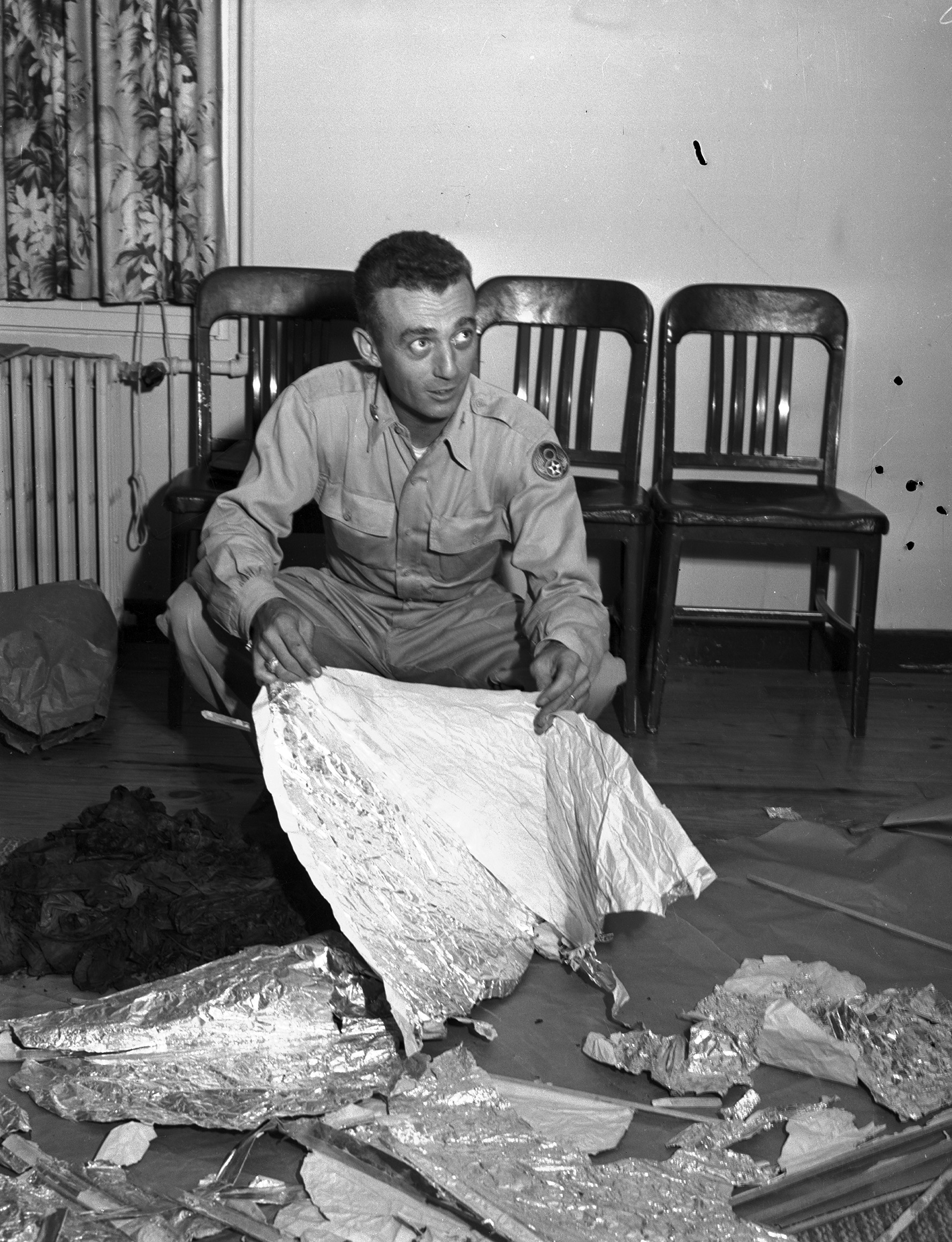
At Fort Worth Army Air Field, Major Jesse A. Marcel posing with debris on July 8, 1947

On July 8, 1947, RAAF public information officer Walter Haut issued a press release stating that personnel from the field's 509th Operations Group had recovered a "flying disc", which had landed on a ranch near Roswell.

The following day, the "disc" was revealed to be pieces of a weather balloon. On July 9, Roswell Daily Record reported that the debris consisted of "large area of bright wreckage made up of rubber strips, tinfoil, a rather tough paper and sticks."

==== Reports diminish ====
On July 9, the Oakland Tribune announced that reports had dropped off and "it appeared the show is over". Press reported that the Army and Navy had begun a campaign to halt the flying disc tales.

Also on July 9, media reported that a triangular object found near Oxford Ohio by John Strucks was also a radar target used on weather balloons. Dozens of "flying discs" in Richmond, Virginia were revealed to be paper plates released by jokesters from a tall building. On July 9, airplane inventor Orville Wright argued the disc reports are "more propaganda for war, to stir up the people and excite them to believe a foreign power has designs on this nation".

On July 9, Missouri press reported that a contraption made from pie pans, wires, and radio tubes was found burning on the Clayton County courthouse lawn.

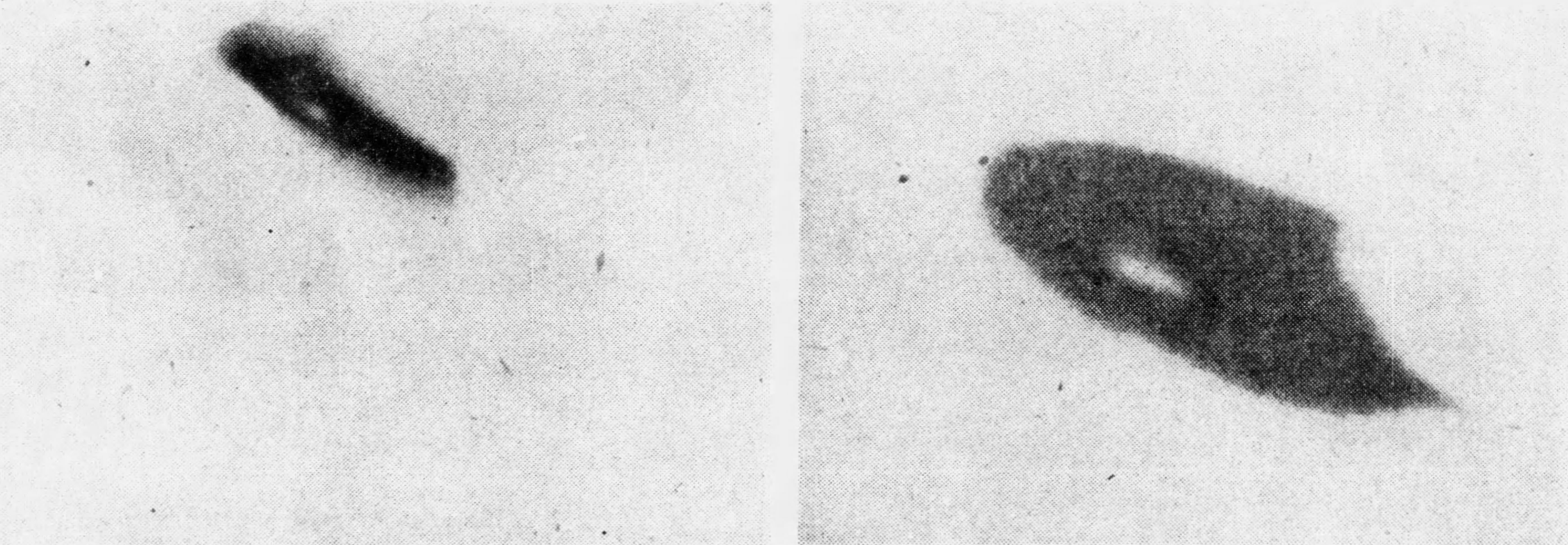
The Rhodes flying disc photos of Phoenix were published by the Arizona Republic on July 9.

Al Hixenbaugh of the Louisville Times photographed two objects streaking across the sky. William A. Rhodes photographed an object over the skies of Phoenix. Disc reports from Iran were published in US media.

On July 9, with the announcement of new disc reports from Kansas, reports had come from all 48 states. That same day, press ran headlines reporting: "Army, Navy try to stop rumors of 'Flying Discs'".

==== Hoaxed discs recovered in Hollywood and Detroit ====
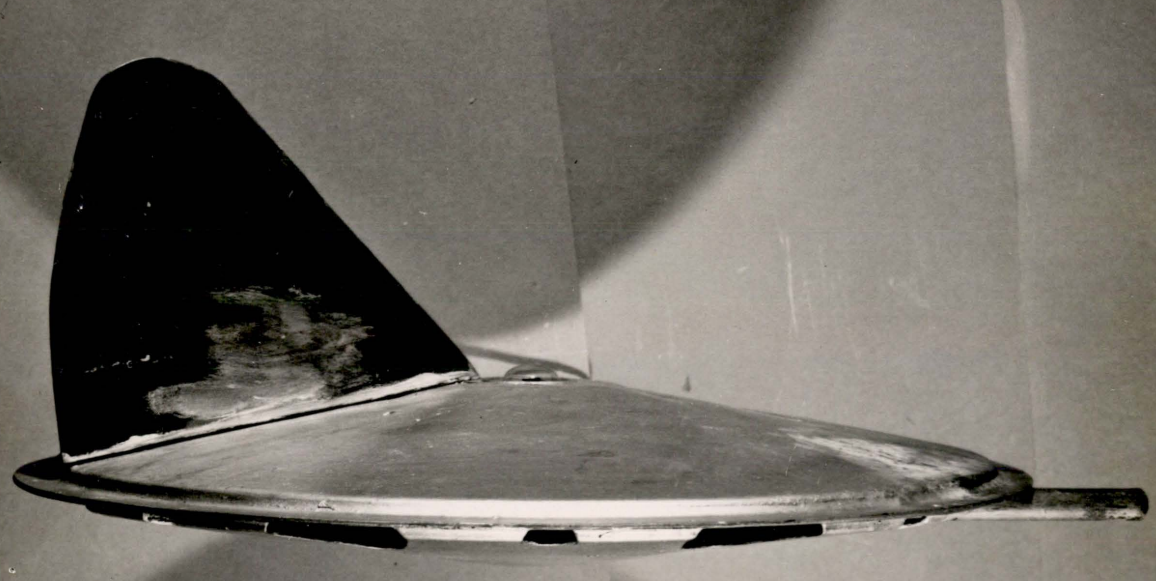
North Hollywood hoaxed flying disc

On July 10, it was reported that Russell Long of North Hollywood had discovered a 30-inch diameter disc which allegedly struck his house and came to rest in his flower garden. The disc, still smoking, prompted a call to the fire department; firemen reported an "acrid, chemical smell". The device was described as having exhaust pipes, a fin and rudder. The local fire battalion chief told press that "It looks like someone went to a great deal of trouble for a joke." The disc featured a glass radio tube. Local FBI chief Richard B. Hood reported that the FBI took possession of the disc and would turn it over to the military.

In Detroit, Emmett C. Daniels discovered a disc with "red painted hieroglyphics apparently of oriental origin". Local workers took credit for creating the disc.

==== Balloons ====
The Navy announced it had conducted a test, releasing a helium balloon carrying a tin-foil screen over Stone Mountain, Georgia. As anticipated, local newspapers received disc reports. Leroy Leach of Dover, Ohio reported discovering a balloon with foil on his farm. On July 10, a local army recruiter was photographed with a shattered kite and balloon that had been recovered from Bakersfield.

In Lima, Ohio, a cardboard disc attached to a balloon was recovered by Julian Faccenda, workers at a local factory took credit for the device. Original disc witness Kenneth Arnold flatly denied that the objects he saw could have been balloons.

The Wisconsin Civil Air Patrol announced it had ceased its aerial search for discs.

In Barstow, California, one columnist observed that reporting on discs might jeopardize national security: "If these 'flying discs' are enemy experimental dummy bombs or rockets, we have given the enemy valuable information. We have published the exact location, time, etc. This would make excellent data for enemy agents." Walter Winchell speculated that, despite official denials, the disc reports likely stemmed from secret Navy flying wing aircraft.

==== Twin Falls recovered disc hoax ====
Hoaxed saucer from Twin Falls

On July 11, press reported the recovery of a 30-inch disc from the yard of a Twin Falls home. Residents reported hearing a "thud" around 2:30 a.m., but dismissed the noise as a truck. At 8:20 a.m., a next-door neighbor reportedly discovered a "disc" and summoned police.

Local police arrived and took possession of the object. The matter was referred to both FBI and military intelligence. Multiple officers from Fort Douglas flew in to investigate. Authorities "clamped down a lid of secrecy pending the outcome of further investigation". Local press featured a piece on Army "cloak and dagger" during the disc investigation, mentioning that photographs of the object were confiscated. On July 11, the FBI reported the apparently-mundane object had been turned over to the Army.

On July 12, it was reported nationally that the Twin Falls disc was a hoax. Photos of the object were publicly released. The object was described as containing radio tubes, electric coils, and wires underneath a Plexiglas dome. Press reported that four teenagers had confessed to creating the disc.

The Twin Falls hoax, with its nationally published image showing a bemused army officer holding a disc-like object of mundane construction, has been called the "Coup de Grace of press coverage" on the Summer 1947 Flying Disc wave; in the days following the story, "press accounts rapidly fell off".

=== Reports subside ===
Bloecher writes: "With scarcely more than a dozen sightings for July 10th, the UFO wave of 1947 had almost completely subsided. Few if any of the reports were carried by the wire services". Bloecher adds: "While interest was high at the time of the sightings, it died out not long after".

Another scholar commented on the brevity of the craze, writing: "The first newspaper accounts preceded a sweep of confirmative stories — some creditable, some doubtful, some proven hoaxes, and innumerable explanations — that caught the nation's attention in a matter of days, and the world inside of three weeks...Yet a hypothetical person not in contact with a medium of communication during the incident, and returning to read an American newspaper after July 20, 1947, would know nothing of the episode which, shortly before, held the world in its grip. The episode was that short, that concentrated, that volatile."

In 1948, the press published a new spate of disc reports and revitalized interest in discs.

==== Crash at Kelso ====
Location of Maury Island, Washington

On August 1, it was publicly reported that a B-25 departing McChord Field bound for Hamilton Field had crashed near Kelso, Washington, killing both pilot and co-pilot; two other men bailed out, though one was critically injured in the parachute jump.

The following day, press accounts revealed that a "mysterious telephone informant with uncannily accurate information" had contacted the United Press of Tacoma. The caller claimed that the crashed B-25 had been loaded with flying disc fragments; the caller further claimed that flying saucer witnesses Kenneth Arnold and E.J. Smith had been "in secret conference" at Tacoma's Hotel Winthrop. General Ned Schramm of the fourth air force publicly acknowledged that the deceased pilots were intelligence officers who had traveled to Tacoma to meet with original saucer witness Kenneth Arnold, but Schramm told denied knowledge of any debris onboard the plane, telling press that "it was his understanding" that the pilots "were not bringing anything back with them".

By August 3, press reported a detailed narrative about the events: original saucer witness Kenneth Arnold had travelled to Tacoma to investigate claims by Fred Crisman and Harold Dahl, who reported recovering debris dropped by a flying saucer at Maury Island. Flight 105 pilot E.J. Smith joined the investigation, which received "lava rocks" from Crisman who claimed they were "flying disc debris". Army Air Force investigators were contacted, and two investigators flew to Tacoma where they took possession of the debris and departed in their B-25 to return to Hamilton Field.

=== Public awareness ===
On August 19, Gallup published a poll reporting that 90% of the public had heard about flying discs. Reports noted this poll "places the saucers on par with Orson Welles' 'Invasion from Mars', the Loch Ness Monster, and Tom Thumb Golf." By comparison, only half the public had heard of the Marshall Plan.

The survey showed that 29% of the public believed the discs were illusions or imaginary, 33% did not know what the discs were, and 9% offered other interpretations, including linking the discs to atomic weapons or the end of the world.

=== Maps and table of reports ===
Maps of the 1947 flying disc craze
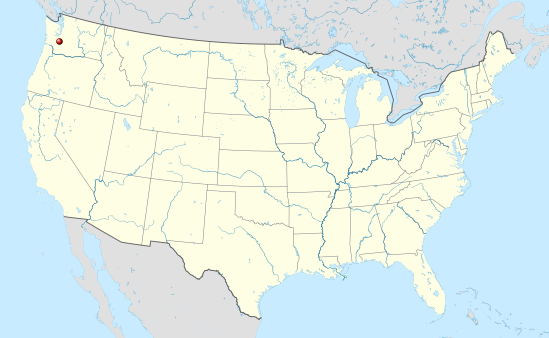
June 25 - Kenneth Arnold sighting near Mount Rainier

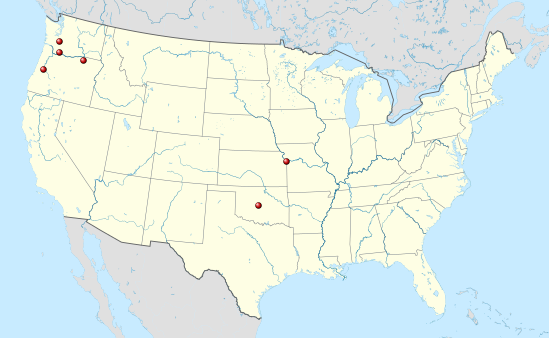
June 26 - Reports from Oregon, Missouri, and Oklahoma

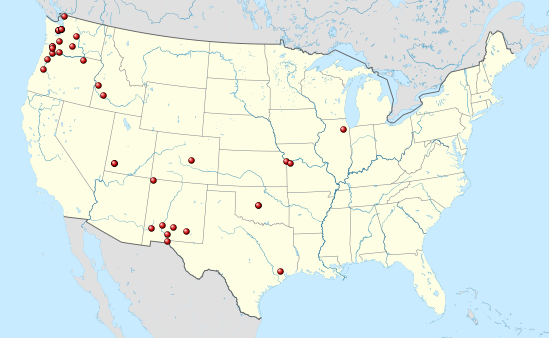
June 27 - Reports continue in Washington, Oregon, and Oklahoma

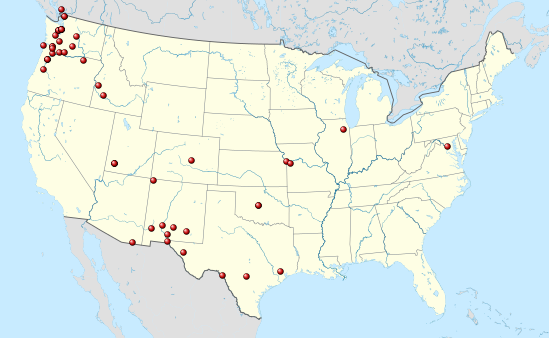
June 28 - Reports spread throughout the West. Idaho, Colorado, Utah, New Mexico, Texas, and Illinois see their first reports.

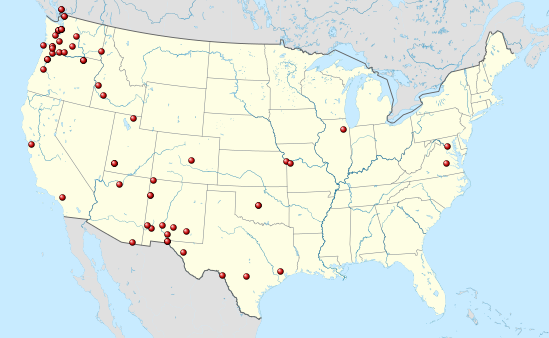
June 29 - Washington, Oregon, and Texas experience further reports, while British Columbia and Arizona see their first reports.

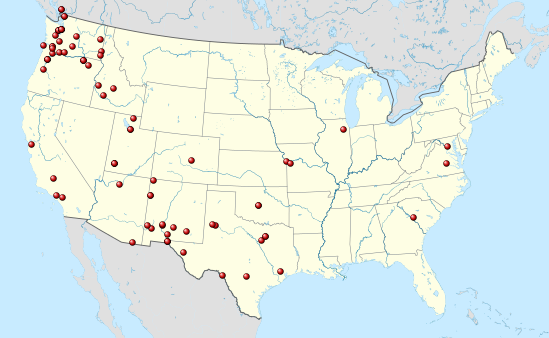
June 30 - Continuing reports from British Columbia, Washington, Arizona, New Mexico, Idaho, Utah, and Texas. Reports spread to California, Virginia, and Ontario.

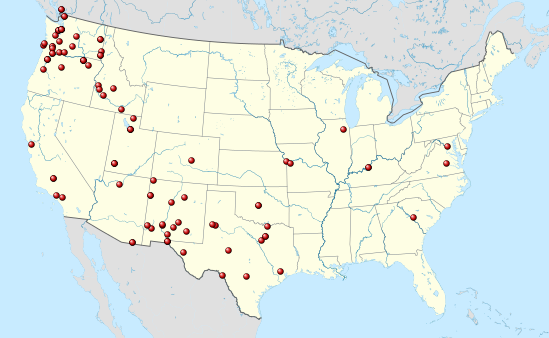
July 1 - Continued reports in Washington, Oregon, California, Idaho, Utah, New Mexico, and Texas. First report from South Carolina.

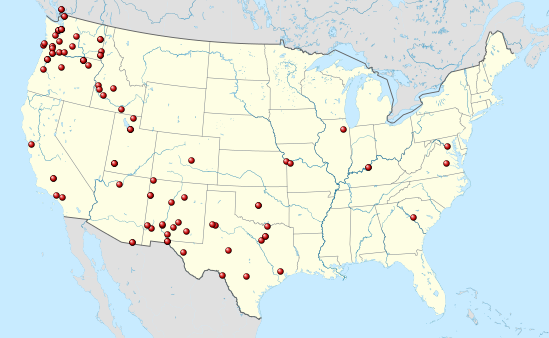
July 2 - Ongoing reports in Washington, Oregon, California, Idaho, Utah, Arizona, New Mexico, and Texas. First report from Kentucky.

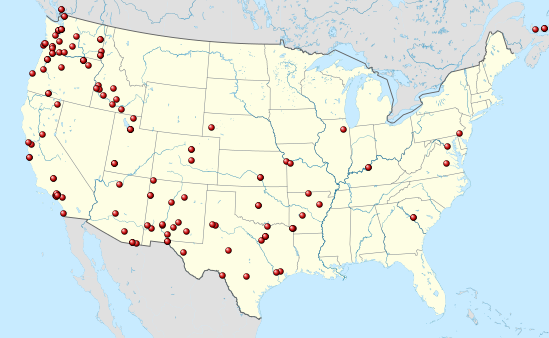
July 3 - More reports from Washington, Oregon, California, Idaho, Colorado, Utah, Arizona, New Mexico, and Texas. Reports spread to Kansas, Arkansas, and Prince Edward Island.

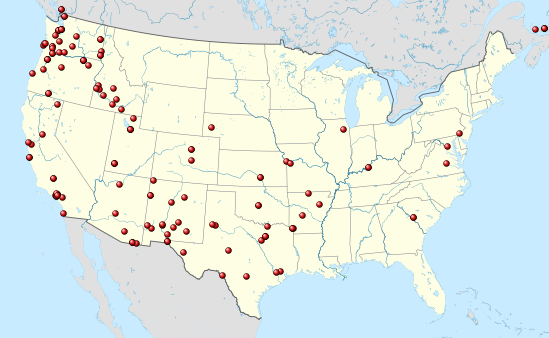
July 4 - Widespread sightings amid first reports from Delaware

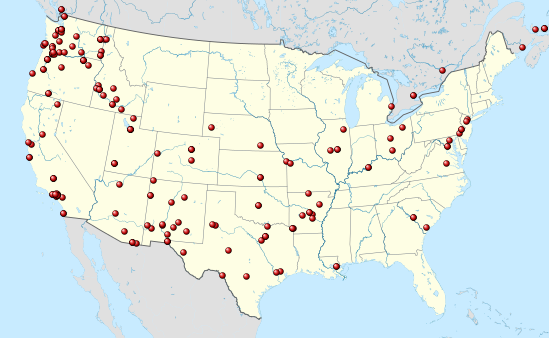
July 5 -

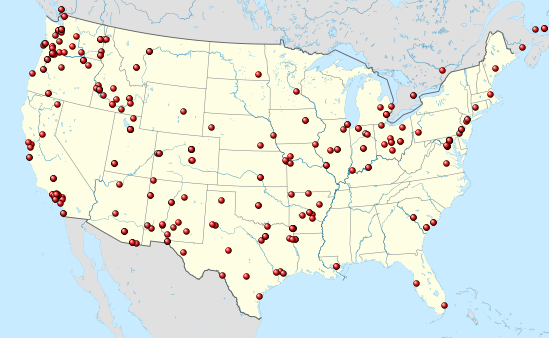
July 6 -

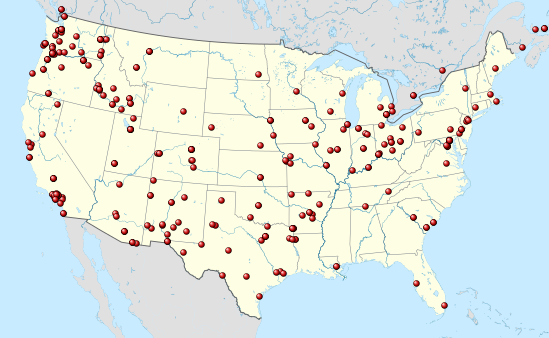
July 7 -

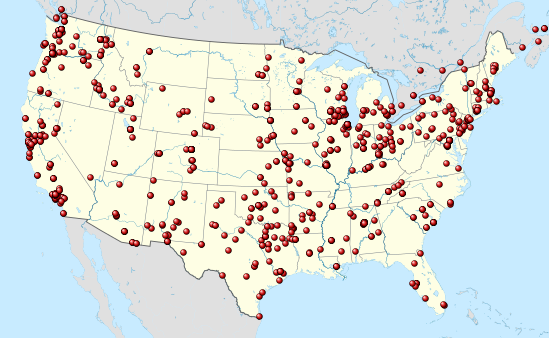
July 8 - Reports spread throughout the United States.

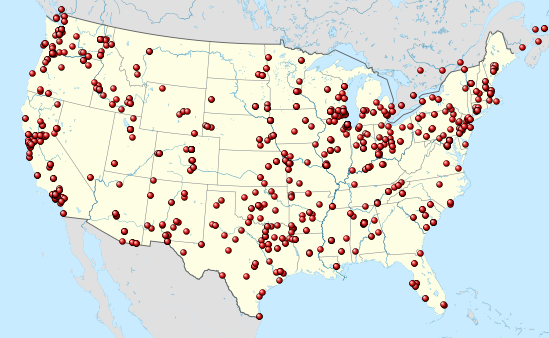
July 9 - Reports reach all states

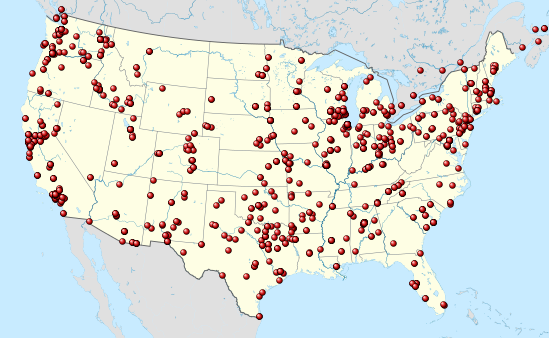
July 10

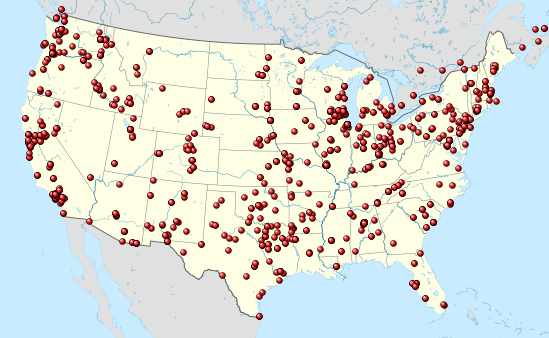
July 11 - Reports have largely subsided.

== Contemporary interpretations ==
=== Technological ===
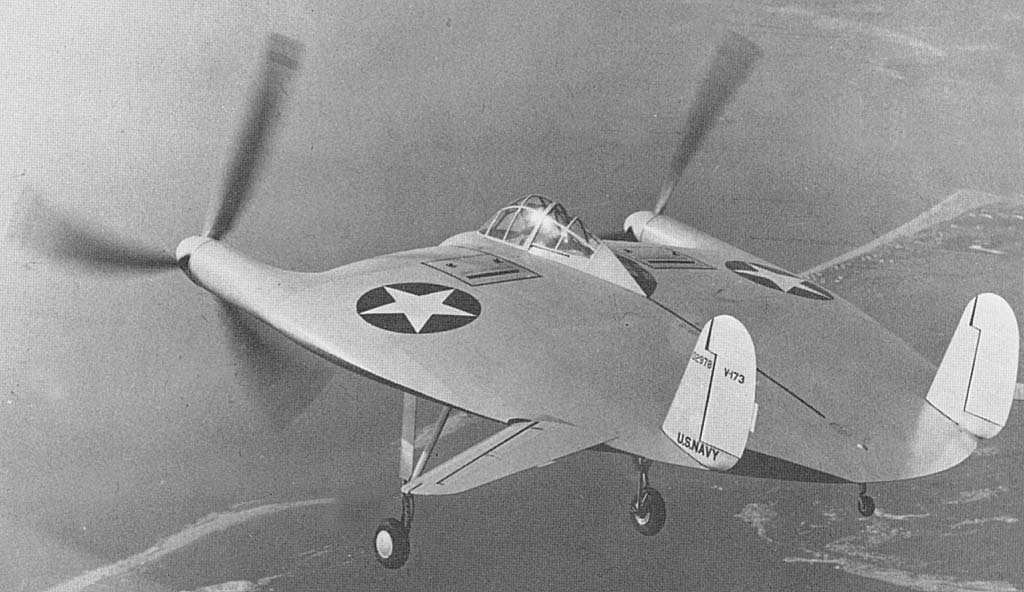
The US Navy had experimented with disc-shaped aircraft during World War II. Members of the public speculated the craft were responsible for disc reports, though Navy officials later debunked the theory.

Initial speculation held that the disc might be technology developed by the Americans or the Soviets.

Army rocket expert Lt. Col. Harold R. Turner publicly speculated the "discs" were jet airplanes, arguing that "the jet planes' circular exhaust glows brightly when heated and might easily appear to be discs at a distance.

By June 29, public speculation suggested that the reports might be attributed to "Flying Flapjack", an experimental Navy fighter aircraft with a somewhat disc-shaped body that had been profiled in the May 1947 issue of Mechanix Illustrated. The Navy dismissed that suggestion, noting that only one such prototype existed, and it had never flown outside of Connecticut.

On July 3, Army Lt. Gen Nathan Twining, head of Air Material Command and commander of Wright Field, announced an investigation into the discs and informed the public that the Army Air Forces "have nothing that would compare to the descriptions of the object"

On July 6, the International News Services interviewed racecar builder Leo Bentz who speculated the discs were the work of an inventor named George De Bay. On July 9, the El Paso Times published an editorial calling on the Army to admit the discs were new US technology.

Others suggested the discs were Russian weapons, akin to the incendiary balloons released by the Japanese to cross the Pacific and explode in the US. The Los Angeles Examiner received and publicized a letter claiming the discs were atomic-powered Russian planes.

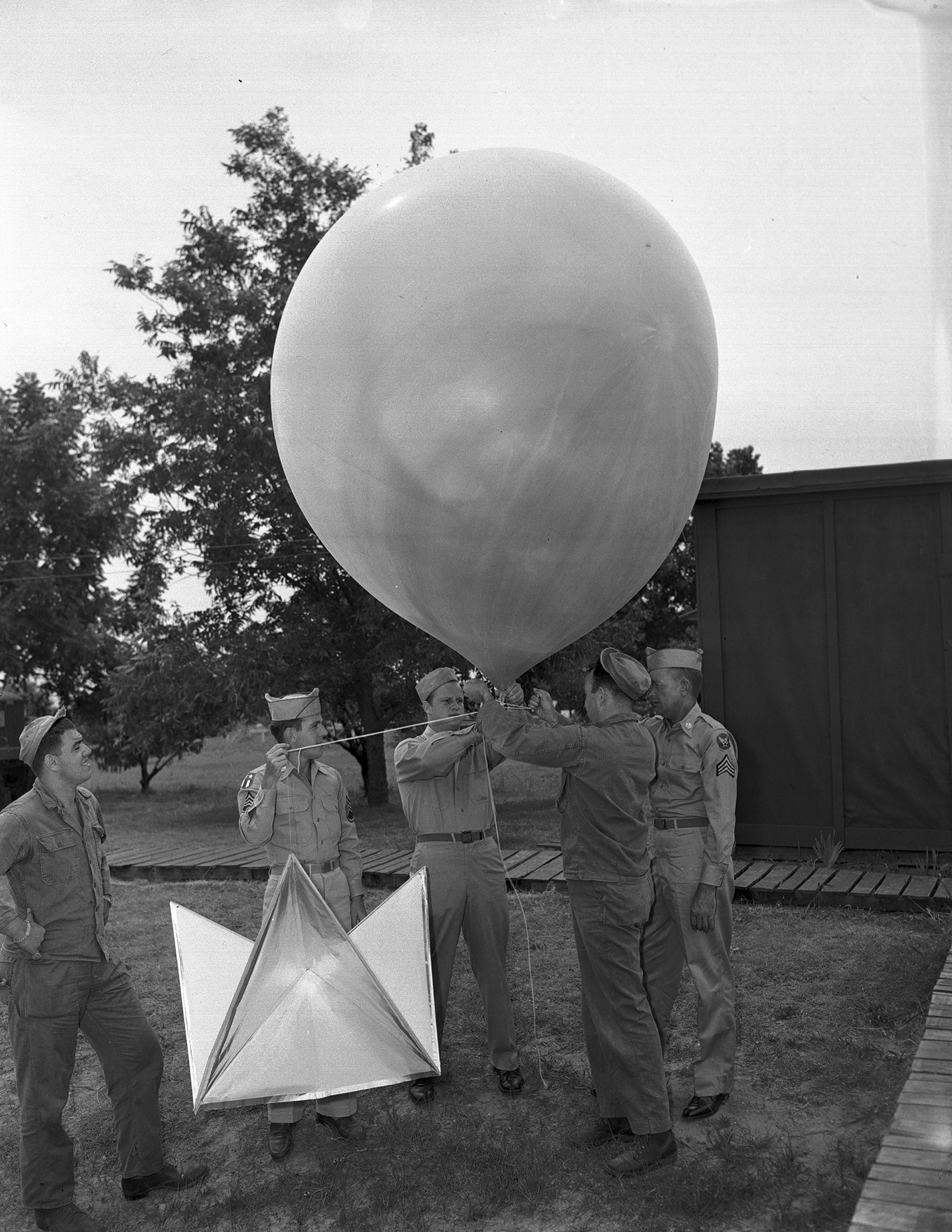
Balloons, radar reflectors, tinfoil, insulation, and numerous other objects were thought to contribute to the reports.

Retired general Hap Arnold (no relation) publicly speculated the discs had either been developed by United States scientists or were foreign technology "operating out of control".

=== Conventional ===
Army rocket expert Lt. Col. Harold R. Turner revised his estimate on June 29 and suggested that meteors, not jets, were responsible. One ironworks operator speculated that the " flying discs" were caused by the melting of bottlecaps". Oklahoma sightings were revealed as handbills released from an airplane. Numerous recovered objects were revealed to hoaxes, pranks, or mistaken identifications.

On July 4, press nationwide quoted an unnamed Chicago scientist who speculated that people were seeing "spots in front of their eyes." In the prior decades, reports of canals on Mars had been revealed to stem from optical illusions.

=== Behavioral ===
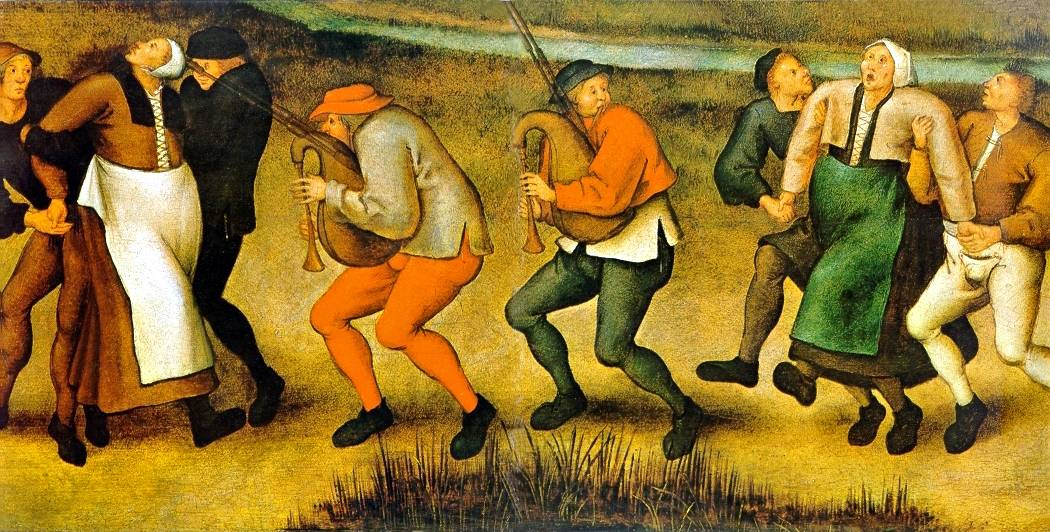
Dancing plagues of the Middle Ages are thought to have been caused by mass hysteria.

During the 1947 craze, experts in human behavior argued the reports were best explained as a psychological or social phenomenon. The flying disc craze was compared to Scotland's Loch Ness monster, the panic caused by the Orson Welles broadcast of War of the Worlds, and a sea monster panic caused by a US Armed Forces Radio hoax in Japan.

On July 3, the International News Service suggested a sociological component, arguing that Arnold had "broken the ice" and induced "trained observers to tell stories they had hesitated to relate before in the fear nobody would believe them". As early as July 5, press featured speculation that the disc craze was the result of mass hysteria.

On July 9, psychiatrist Edward Strecker described discs as the result of "pathological receptiveness". Strecker argued that initial witnesses "may have seen something, such as the glint of an airplane" while subsequent sightings were likely illusions brought on by hysteria. Strecker argued that 'the emotional state of many person had been over-active since the first atomic bomb exploded'. Winfred Overholser, nationally renown psychiatrist, described the reports as a "national hysteria".

On July 9, it was reported that an Indianapolis woman was sent to a mental ward after she was discovered "hacking holes in the sidewalk with a hatchet" in an effort to 'drive the saucers away'. The Pittsburgh Sun-Telegraph ran a headline telling readers "If you're seeing those saucers -- call the psychiatrist, and quick!" after a Harvard professor proclaimed that flying disc mystery was "not a problem for meteorologists or astronomers, but one for psychiatrists."

=== Interplanetary ===
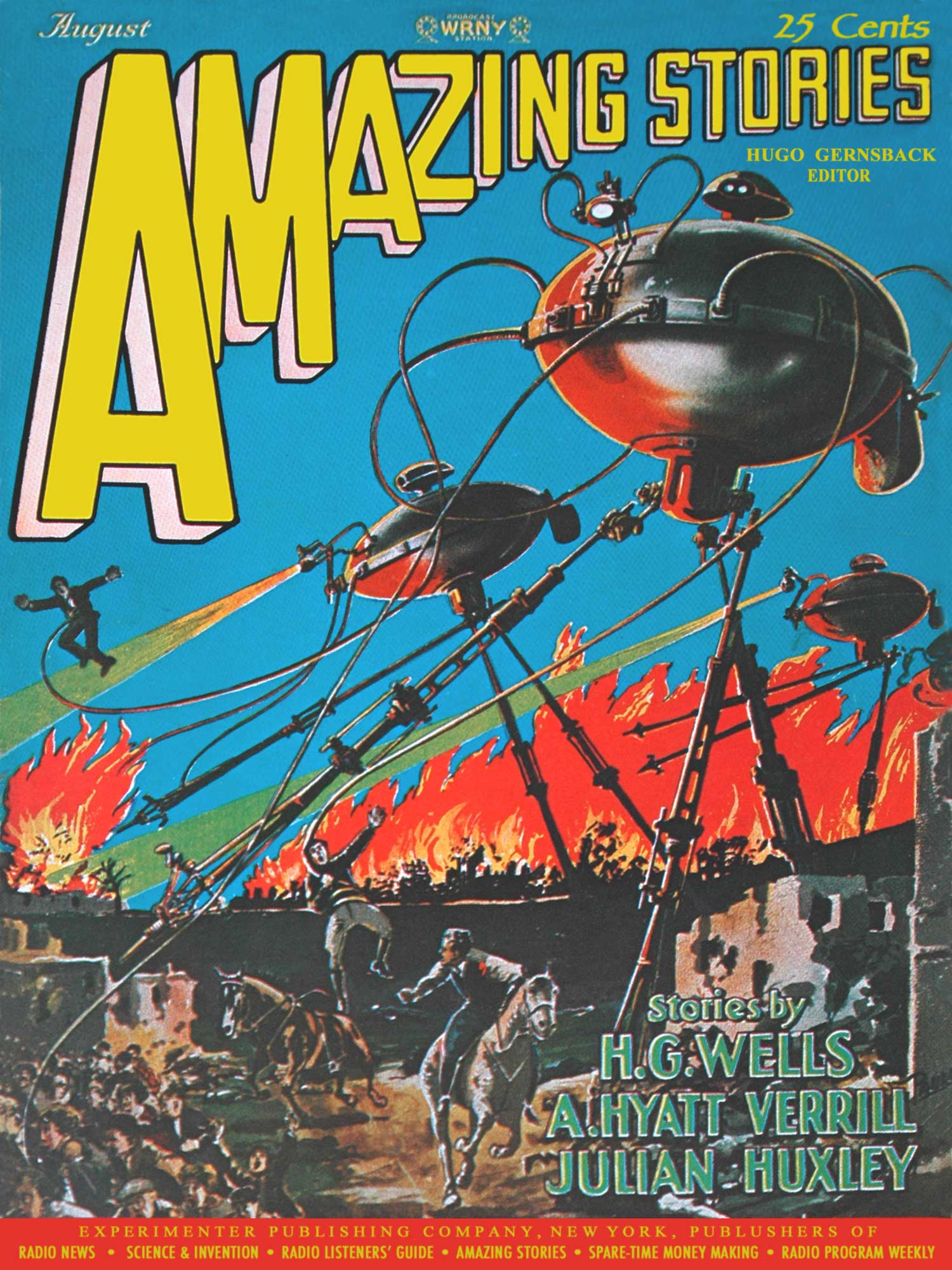
Interplanetary invaders, as depicted on the August 1927 cover of Amazing Stories

On June 27, unnamed experts argued that supersonic saucer-shaped aircraft would be "out of this planet". On June 28, headlines joked "No, They're Not Men from Mars". By June 29, one source reported that "These discs, some people suggest, may presage an invasion from Mars."

On July 7, 1947, two stories came out where Arnold raised the topic of possible extraterrestrial origins, both as his opinion and those who had written to him. Per the Chicago Times:

"...Kenneth Luis Arnold...is not so certain that the strange contraptions are made on this planet. Arnold...said he hoped the devices were really the work of the U.S. Army. But he told the TIMES in a phone conversation: 'If our government knows anything about these devices, the people should be told at once. A lot of people out here are very much disturbed. Some think these things may be from another planet. But they aren't harming anyone and I think it would be the wrong thing to shoot one of them down—even if can be done. Their high speed would completely wreck them...'

"Arnold, in pointing to the possibility of these discs being from another world, said, regardless of their origin, they apparently were traveling to some reachable destination. Whoever controlled them, he said, obviously wasn't trying to hurt anyone...He said discs were making turns so abruptly in rounding peaks that it would have been impossible for human pilots inside to have survived the pressure. So, he too thinks they are controlled from elsewhere, regardless of whether it's from Mars, Venus, or our own planet."

On July 9, US Senator from Idaho Glen H. Taylor said he 'almost hoped' that the discs would turn out to be space ships from another planet. Taylor explained that "'the mere possibility' that the spinning circles might be hostile would unify the peoples of earth as nothing else could." In an Associated Press story from July 19, Arnold reiterated his belief that if they weren't Army, then they were extraterrestrial.

=== Biological ===
Another line of thought argued that the reports might be caused not by technological alien spacecraft or mass hysteria, but rather by animal lifeforms that are indigenous to Earth's atmosphere or interplanetary space.

In 1923, paranormal author Charles Fort had mused "It seems no more incredible that up in the seemingly unoccupied sky there should be hosts of living things than that the seeming blank of the ocean should swarm with life". On July 7, 1947, a fan of Fort's writings named John Philip Bessor became the first modern proponent of the hypothesis when he authored a letter to the Air Force suggesting that discs might be "animals bearing very little likeness to human beings". In 1949, he wrote to the Saturday Evening Post to suggest that the discs might be "more like octopuses, in mentality, than humans". In April 1949, the Air Force's Project Sign released an essay which considered the hypothesis, writing "the possible existence of some sort of strange extraterrestrial animals has been remotely considered, as many of the objects described acted more like animals than anything else".

In October 1954, Alfred Loedding was publicly quoted on his suspicion that the disks "may be a kind of space animal". By 1955, original saucer witness Kenneth Arnold began to promote the theory, suggesting that the UFOs are "sort of like sky jellyfish." Arnold added: "My theory might sound funny, but just remember that there are a lot of things in nature that we don't know yet."

=== Eschatological ===
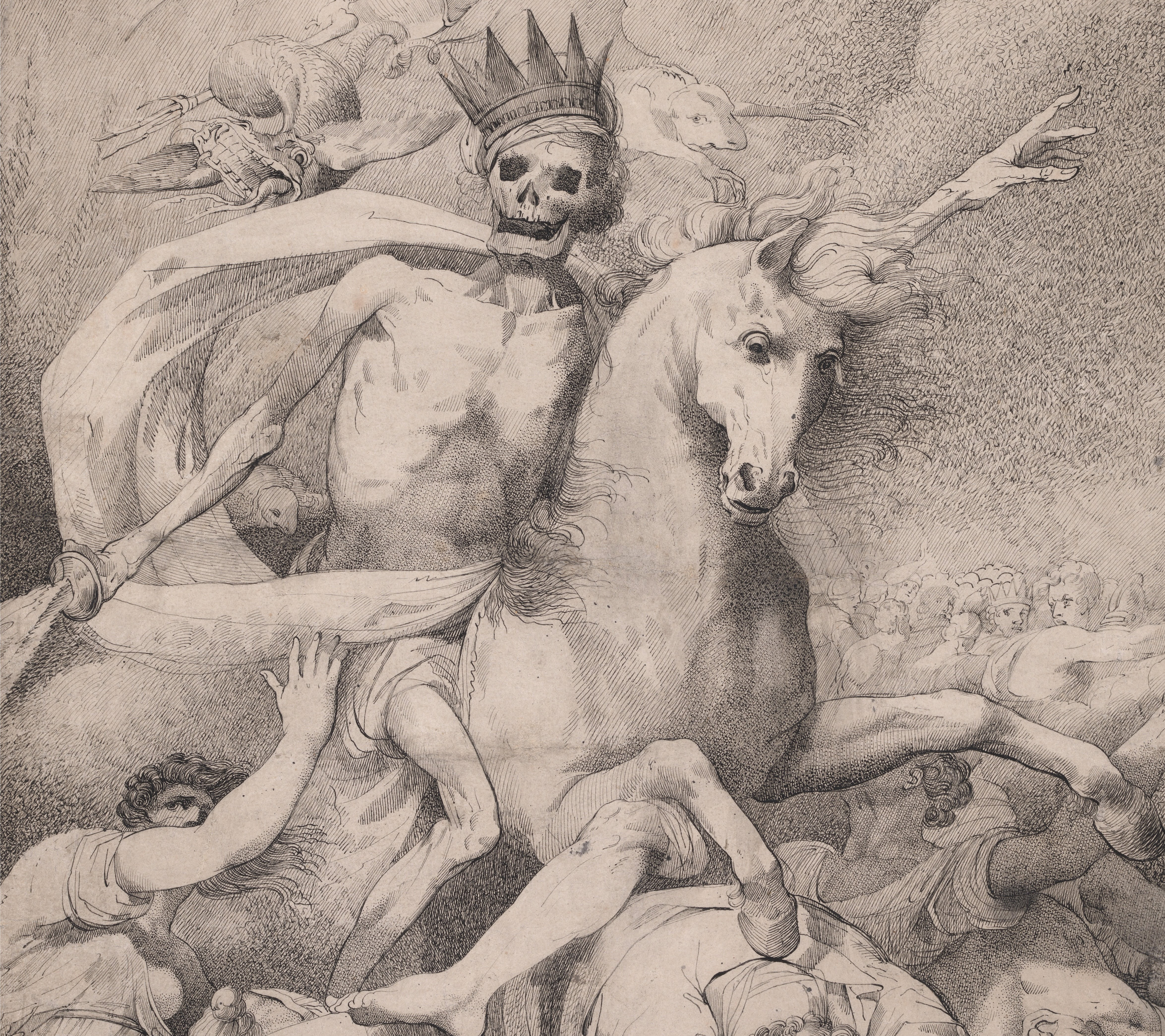
"Death on a Pale Horse", an apocalyptic image from the Book of Revelation, as depicted by 18th-century artist John Hamilton Mortimer

Some members of the public interpreted the reports as signifying the end of the world.

On June 27, Kenneth Arnold told press that he had been contacted by a preacher who insisted saucers were harbingers of Doomsday. On June 30, one Oregon preacher suggested that the discs were "the 'advance guard' of universal disaster, heralding the end of the world". On July 9, deputies in Everett, Idaho took a woman into custody who was marching around a lake, Bible in hand, speaking only of discs and the end of the world. The woman had never been known to be irrational, a deputy told press. In Oshkosh, a housewife directed press to the Book of Job, explaining "when man becomes too vain and smart, some divine being will send things of various sizes and shapes through the air to confound and confuse man". On July 5, press reported on a 67-year-old gardener who claimed to have watched saucers for about 30 minutes before going to bed, saying: "I thought about waking up some of my neighbors but decided if it meant the end of the world they would be just about as happy sleeping when the world ended."

In Louisiana, Governor Jimmie Davis relayed an explanation attributed to an 'elderly negro': "Saucers are part of the prophecy, something man is supposed to see and not understand. Next the world will know no seasons; Winter will come in the Summer; In Winter men will walk before they crawl; cotton will open before it blooms; the watermelon will come before the vine; in fact, I look for it to be kind of spooky from now on."

=== Occult ===
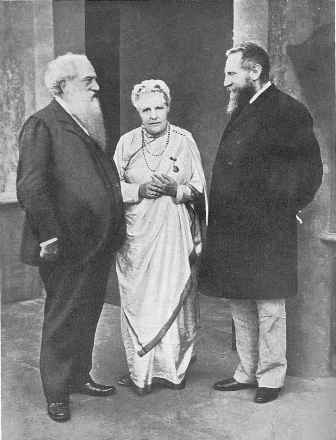
Theosophists Annie Besant, Henry Olcott (left) and Charles Leadbeater (right) popularized the mythical "etheric plane".

As early as July 4, occultists like Meade Layne claimed that the discs were occult or "etheric". Layne claimed to be in telepathic communication with "people in the saucers", arguing "it is possible for objects to pass from an etheric to a dense level of matter and will then appear to materialize. They then will return to [...] etheric conditions". Layne claimed that "These visitors are not excarnate humans but are human beings living in their own world. They come with good intent. They have some idea of experimenting with earth life." The prior year, it had been reported that Layne consulted a medium who relayed communications from a "space ship named Careeta" that came to Earth from 'an unidentified planet'.

=== Esoteric ===
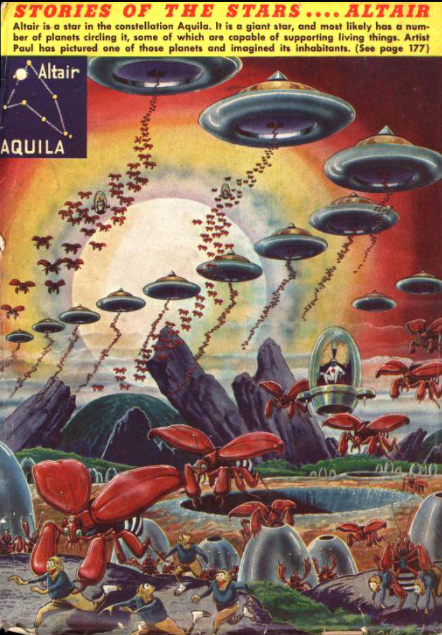
Nearly a year before the flying disc craze, Amazing Stories featured disc-shaped spacecraft.

During the mid-1940s, an obscure sub-culture developed around the science-fiction magazine Amazing Stories and its tales of Richard Sharpe Shaver, claimed to be non-fictional. Since 1945, the magazine had published Shaver's claims to be in communication with subterranean beings concerned about atomic pollution who piloted disc-shaped craft.

In the October 1947 issue of Amazing Stories, editor Raymond Palmer argued the flying disc flap was proof of Richard Sharpe Shaver's claims. That same issue carried a letter from Shaver in which he argued the truth behind the discs would remain a secret.

Wrote Shaver: "The discs can be a space invasion, a secret new army plane — or a scouting trip by an enemy country...OR, they can be Shaver's space ships, taking off and landing regularly on earth for centuries past, and seen today as they have always been — as a mystery. They could be leaving earth with cargos of wonder-mech that to us would mean emancipation from a great many of our worst troubles— and we'll never see those cargos...I predict that nothing more will be seen, and the truth of what the strange disc ships really are will never be disclosed to the common people. We just don't count to the people who do know about such things. It isn't necessary to tell us anything."

== Aftermath ==
Original saucer witness Kenneth Arnold went on to detail his purported sightings and subsequent disc investigations in a 1952 book co-authored with Amazing Stories editor Raymond Palmer. Arnold was the Republican nominee in the 1962 Idaho lieutenant gubernatorial election; In 1977, he appeared at a convention curated by Fate Magazine to mark the thirtieth anniversary of the "birth of the modern UFO age".

Occultist Meade Layne went on to found the pseudo-scientific "Borderland Sciences Research Associates". In 1961, he self-published The Flying Saucer Mystery and Its Solution, continuing to argue for his "Ether Ship" belief; Layne would come to be seen as an early proponent of the interdimensional hypothesis. Numerous other Saucer cults and UFO religions arose in the coming years.

Richard Sharpe Shaver, who had made claims of an ancient underground advanced civilization since 1945, continued to promote his stories. During the last decades of his life, Shaver devoted himself to "rock books"—stones that he believed had been created by the advanced ancient races and embedded with legible pictures and texts. After Shaver's death in 1975, his editor Raymond Palmer admitted that "Shaver had spent eight years not in the Cavern World, but in a mental institution" being treated for paranoid schizophrenia.

On September 23, 1947, Lieutenant General Twining issued a memo to Brigadier General George Schulgen of the Army Air Forces. The subject line of the memo read "AMC Opinion Concerning 'Flying Discs.'" The general tone of the memo was that unidentified objects seen in the skies by military personnel were not weather, astronomical or other phenomena but rather objects that warranted further investigation. Twining wrote "The phenomenon reported is something real and not visionary or fictitious."

In 1948, General Nathan Twining, of Air Material Command, initiated Project Sign, an Air Force investigation into the reports. Twining went on to become Chief of Staff of the United States Air Force in 1953. He remained in that post until 1957 when he was appointed Chairman of the Joint Chiefs of Staff by Eisenhower. In 1984, the hoaxed Majestic 12 documents included a memo attributed to Twining; Upon examination, the FBI declared the documents to be "completely bogus"—an assessment echoed by most Ufologists.

=== Flying saucer conspiracy theories ===
In May 1949, journalist Donald Keyhoe of True magazine was tasked with investigating the reports. On December 26, True published Keyhoe's piece, titled "The Flying Saucers Are Real". Keyhoe claimed that elements within the Air Force knew that saucers existed and had concluded they were likely 'inter-planetary'. The True article caused a sensation. The article was expanded into a book of the same name. In 1953, Keyhoe wrote that "Since July, 1952, in a new investigation of the saucers, I have been privileged to cooperate with the Air Force. Because of my present understanding of their very serious problem, and certain dangers inherent in the situation, I have been given information unknown to most Americans."

In 1955, Keyhoe authored a book that pointedly accused elements of United States government of engaging in a conspiracy to cover up knowledge of flying saucers. Keyhoe claims the existence of a "silence group" of orchestrating this conspiracy. Historian of folklore Curtis Peebles argues: "The Flying Saucer Conspiracy marked a shift in Keyhoe's belief system. No longer were flying saucers the central theme; that now belonged to the silence group and its coverup. For the next two decades Keyhoe's beliefs about this would dominate the flying saucer myth."

=== Roswell conspiracy theory ===
In February 1978, UFO researcher Stanton Friedman interviewed Jesse Marcel, who had traveled with Roswell debris from New Mexico to Fort Worth. Marcel's statements contradicted those he made to the press in 1947. In November 1979, Marcel's first filmed interview was featured in a documentary titled "UFO's Are Real", co-written by Friedman. On September 20, 1980, Marcel appeared on the TV series In Search of... described his participation in the 1947 press conference: "They wanted some comments from me, but I wasn't at liberty to do that. So, all I could do is keep my mouth shut. And General Ramey is the one who discussed – told the newspapers, I mean the newsman, what it was, and to forget about it. It is nothing more than a weather observation balloon. Of course, we both knew differently." Marcel gave a final interview to HBO's America Undercover which aired in August 1985. Marcel consistently denied the presence of bodies. By the 1990s, Roswell was home to a UFO museum and an annual UFO festival.

=== Project Mogul and Skyhook ===
Skyhook balloons may have been the origin of some UFO observations.

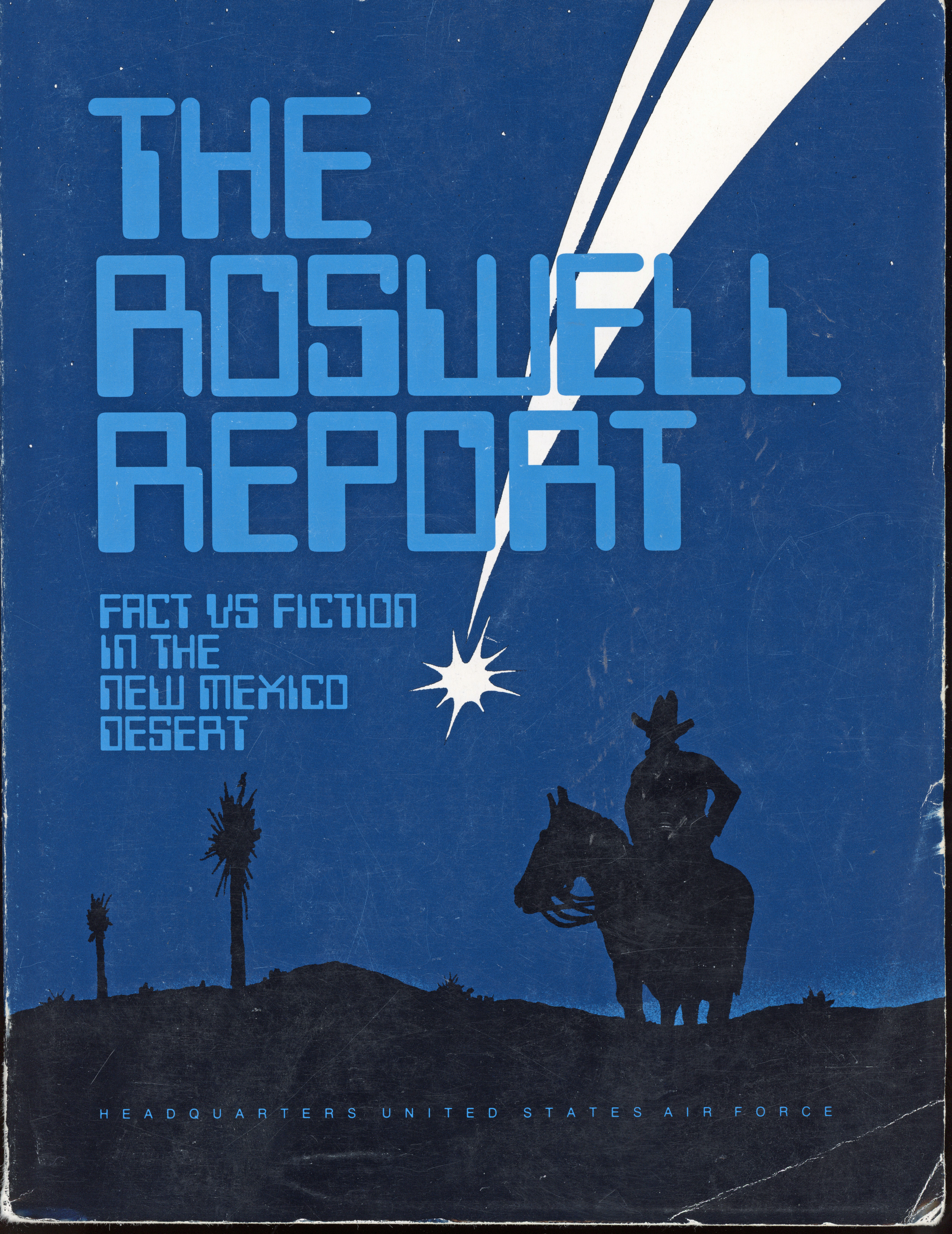
In 1995, the US Government released a report concluding that the Roswell Incident stemmed from a Project MOGUL balloon.

In the 1990s, the US General Accounting Office launched an inquiry and directed the Office of the United States Secretary of the Air Force to conduct an internal investigation about the 1947 UFO wave. The result was summarized in two reports. The first, released in 1994, concluded that the material recovered in 1947 was likely debris from Project Mogul, a military surveillance program employing high-altitude balloons (and classified portion of an unclassified New York University project by atmospheric researchers).

By the 1990s, a scholarly consensus emerged concluding that the military decided to conceal the true purpose of the crashed device—nuclear test monitoring—and instead inform the public that the crash was of a weather balloon. The balloon had been launched from Alamogordo Army Air Field a month earlier. It carried a radar reflector and classified Project Mogul sensors for experimental monitoring of Soviet nuclear testing.

== See also ==
- 1952 Washington, D.C., UFO incident – U.S. Capital flying saucer incidents on consecutive weekends
- 2024 United States drone sightings – Widespread reports of unidentified UAVs
- Battle of Los Angeles – Anti-aircraft shelling during WWII against an imagined invader
- List of reported UFO sightings
- Mad Gasser of Mattoon, a 1944 outbreak of hysteria in Mattoon, Illinois
- Mystery airship – Wave of UFO sightings in the US in 1896/97
- Spring-heeled Jack – English legendary folklore character
- The War of the Worlds (1938 radio drama) – 1938 radio drama by Orson Welles infamous for inciting panic in the listening audience that a Martian invasion was taking place
