= Space animal UFO hypothesis =

Hypothesis on animal lifeforms in space

Saucer-like space animals in popular culture, as shown by the 1948 illustration of Arthur Conan Doyle's "The Horror of the Heights" (top) and the 2022 Jordan Peele film Nope (bottom)

The space animal UFO hypothesis proposes that reports of flying saucers and other UFOs might be the result of animal lifeforms ("space critters") that are indigenous to Earth's atmosphere or interplanetary space, as opposed to technologically advanced alien spacecraft or mass hysteria.

== Proponents ==
Multiple authors independently suggested the space animal hypothesis. In 1923, paranormal author Charles Fort mused, "It seems no more incredible that up in the seemingly unoccupied sky there should be hosts of living things than that the seeming blank of the ocean should swarm with life."

During the 1947 flying disc craze, a fan of Fort's writings named John Philip Bessor became the first modern proponent of the hypothesis when he authored a letter to the Air Force suggesting that discs might be "animals bearing very little likeness to human beings". In 1949, he wrote to the Saturday Evening Post to suggest that the discs might be "more like octopuses, in mentality, than humans". In 1957, a saucer group's newsletter credited Bessor with the "space animal" idea, and in 1978 he was called the "grand-daddy" of the "space critter" hypothesis. In 1948, the Saturday Evening Post quoted Luis Walter Alvarez's opinion that the "gizmos" appeared to be "alive".

In April 1949, the Air Force's Project Sign released an essay which considered the hypothesis, writing "the possible existence of some sort of strange extraterrestrial animals has been remotely considered, as many of the objects described acted more like animals than anything else". In January 1951, Fate magazine published the opinion of David W. Chase who argued that the "saucers are the beings themselves". In 1952, papers speculated that flying saucers were "not carriers for the inhabitants of other planets" but rather that flying saucers "are the living creatures from another planet". In 1953, Walter Karig speculated in American Weekly that the objects behaved more like "puppies" than spaceships. That year, Desmond Leslie's book Flying Saucers Have Landed speculated that a UFO reported over Oloron and Gaillac, France might have been a "huge living thing". In 1954, French engineer René Fouéré published his theory that the "disc-beings" were able to live in space. In October 1954, Alfred Loedding was publicly quoted on his suspicion that the discs "may be a kind of space animal".

By 1955, original saucer witness Kenneth Arnold began to promote the theory, suggesting that the UFOs are "sort of like sky jellyfish". Arnold added: "My theory might sound funny, but just remember that there are a lot of things in nature that we don’t know yet." In 1962, he argued "the so-called unidentified flying objects that have been seen in our atmosphere are not spaceships from another planet at all, but are groups and masses of living organisms that are as much a part of our atmosphere and space as the life we find in the oceans."

In 1955, Austrian occultist Zoe Wassilko-Serecki argued that the saucers were ionospheric animals. Her writings, in turn, influenced Ivan T. Sanderson, who became the "most eminent advocate" of the space animal idea. In 1967, Sanderson authored a book on the topic: Uninvited Visitors: A Biologist Looks at UFOs.

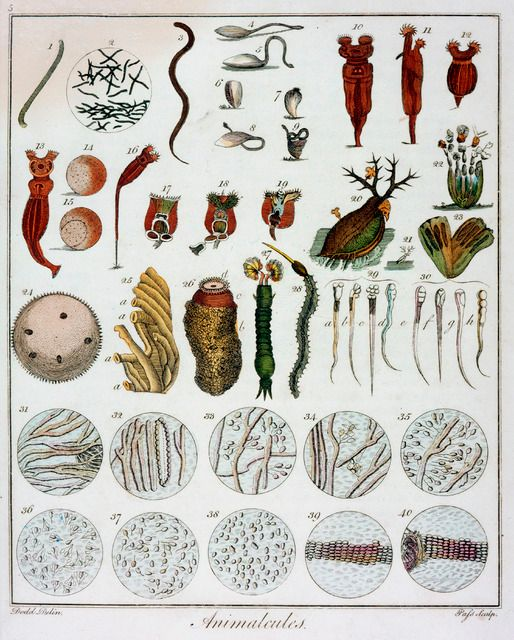
The 17th century invention of the microscope resulted in the discovery of "animalcules", a novel form of life known modernly as microbes.

Trevor James Constable similarly argued that UFOs were in fact amoeba-like animals inhabiting the sky. According to Constable, the creatures could be the size of a coin or as large as half-a-mile (0.80 km) across. Constable authored They Live in the Sky! (1958) and other books about this theory. In later decades, Constable invoked these beings to explain supposed cattle mutilations.

In 2020, former CIA director John Brennan suggested UFOs might "constitute a different form of life".

== Space animals in fiction ==
Arthur Conan Doyle's 1913 short story "The Horror of the Heights" featured an aviator breaking an altitude record who discovered an "air jungle" full of translucent animals resembling jellyfish and snakes. In September 1936, Raymond Z. Gallun's short story "A Beast of the Void" envisioned creatures capable of interstellar travel. Star Trek explored the concept of space animals in episodes like "The Immunity Syndrome" (1968) and "Galaxy's Child" (1991). The Purrgil space whales in the Star Wars franchise are said to have inspired hyperspace travel.

Jordan Peele's 2022 movie Nope featured a UFO that is revealed to be an animal. Peele and his team collaborated with marine biologists to design an undiscovered aerial predator with anatomical and locomotive elements inspired by jellyfish, octopus, and other marine lifeforms.

== See also ==
- 1947 flying disc craze § contemporary interpretations
- Bioship, a science fiction concept of living spaceships
- Cryptoterrestrial hypothesis
- Demonic UFO hypothesis
- Extraterrestrial hypothesis
- Interdimensional hypothesis
- Psychosocial hypothesis
- Time-traveler UFO hypothesis
- Upper-atmospheric lightning
- Thanatological UFO hypothesis
