= The Blond Knight of Germany =

- Author: Trevor J. Constable; Raymond F. Toliver
- Language: English; German
- Genre: Historical non-fiction
- Publisher: Tab Aero (1st English edition); Motorbuch Verlag (1st German edition)
- Publication date: 1970
- Publication place: United States (1970); Germany (1971), as Holt Hartmann vom Himmel!
- Media type: Print

The Blond Knight of Germany is a book by the American authors Trevor J. Constable and Raymond F. Toliver dedicated to the life and career of the German fighter pilot of World War II, Erich Hartmann. Originally released in the United States in 1970, it was published in Germany the next year, as Holt Hartmann vom Himmel! (with the sub-title Die Geschichte des erfolgreichsten Jagdfliegers der Welt).

The Blond Knight was a commercial success and enjoyed a wide readership among both the American and the German public. The book has been criticised by American and German historians as ahistorical and misleading in recent historiography.

== Background ==
Trevor J. Constable and Raymond Toliver are American authors who produced 10 non-fiction books on the fighter aces of World War II. Toliver is a former U.S. Air Force pilot and official historian of the American Fighter Aces Association.

== Criticism ==
The Blond Knight of Germany was criticised by historians Ronald Smelser and Edward J. Davies in their work The Myth of the Eastern Front as one of the key works that promoted the myth of the "clean Wehrmacht". They described the book as a "hallmark of romanticization", with its "insidious" title that suggested medieval chivalry that "not only fails to characterize the conduct of the Wehrmacht during the Soviet-German war, but, indeed, marks its opposite".

The historian Klaus Schmider notes that the authors are "sympathetic" to Hartmann, and that the book "tip[s] over into out-and-out hero worship".

The historian Jens Wehner notes that the German-language version of the book, released in 1971 as Holt Hartmann vom Himmel! Die Geschichte des erfolgreichsten Jagdfliegers der Welt, was immensely popular in Germany, but contained serious flaws in terms of presentation of historical realities. These included the uncritical borrowing from the Nazi propaganda elements of the Fliegerasse ("aces") and stereotypes about the Soviet Union. According to Wehner, the latter could be traced to the prevailing attitudes during the Cold War. Further, the political and social consequences of World War II were completely ignored.
