= Zoe Wassilko-Serecki =

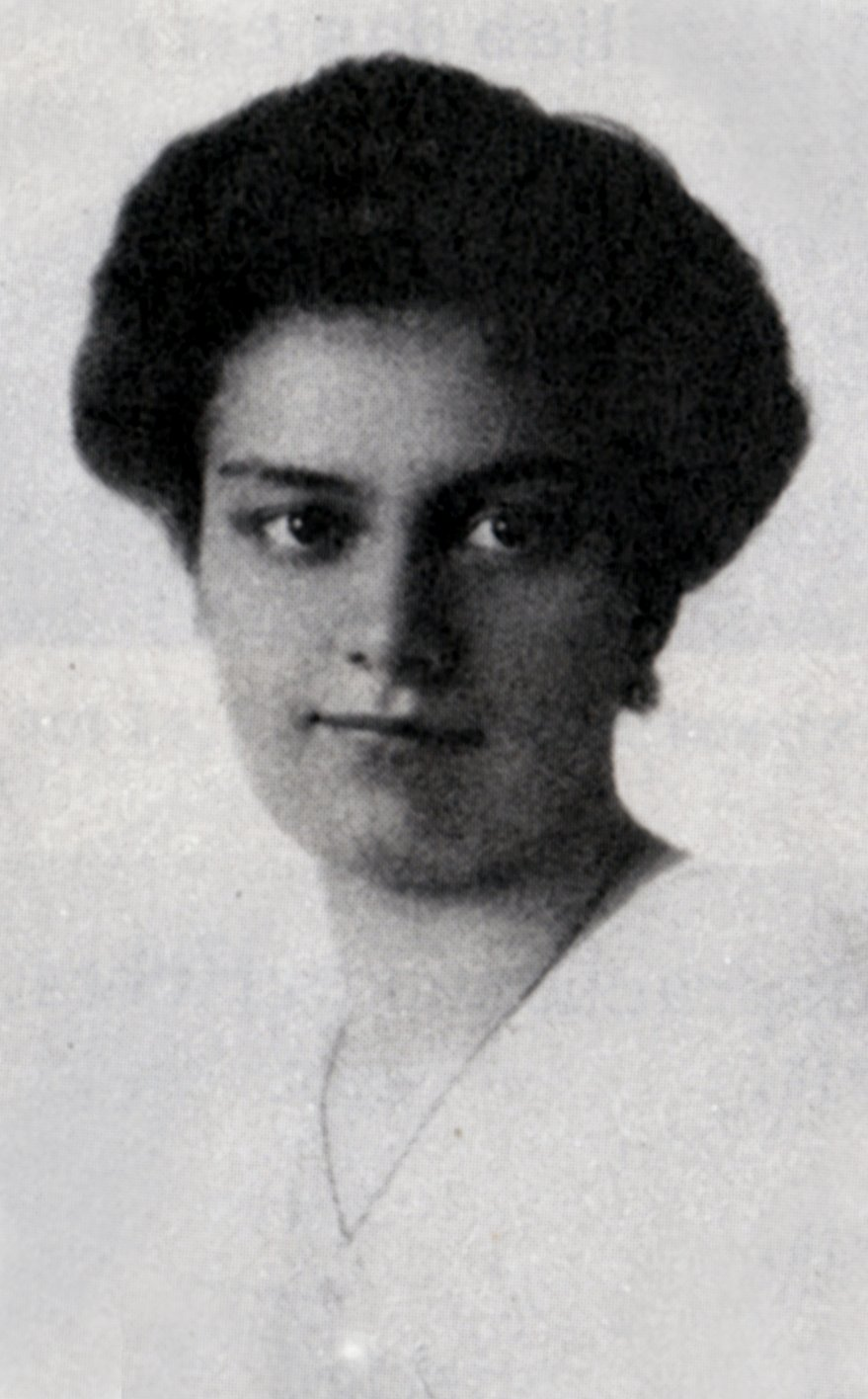
Wassilko-Serecki in 1916

Zoe Wassilko-Serecki (born July 11, 1897, in Czernowitz, died November 26, 1978, in Vienna) was an Austrian occultist and astrologer.

== Early life ==
She was born in 1897 to Stephan Graf Wassilko von Serecki and wife Rosa. Her paternal grandfather was the Privy Councilor and Governor of the Duchy of Bukovina, Baron Alexander Wassilko von Serecki. The Wassilko family were Austrian Empire-born ethnic Romanian nobility.

In 1900, Stephan and his family moved to Vienna where her father pursued a career in the civil service. In 1918, her father and his brothers were elevated to the status of "Count", and Zoe was described as a Countess.

== Career ==
She achieved international fame for her supposed investigation into Eleonore Zugun and the so-called Talpa poltergeist. In 1926, at the invitation of Harry Price, Zoe traveled with the girl to London.

In 1927, she was a founding member of the Austrian Society for Psychical Research. By 1935, she had joined the Nazi party, and in April 1938 correspondence discussing unification of her Austrian society with its German counterpart, she wrote "Poor Winterstein is unfortunately not an Aryan, even in the best possible case he cannot remain the president of the society".

She served as vice-president of the Austrian Astrological Society. In 1949, she became its president, a position she held until 1978. In 1955, an English translation of her work appeared in American Astrology which argued for the space animal hypothesis: that reports of flying saucers or UFOs might be caused not by technological alien spacecraft or mass hysteria, but rather by animal lifeforms that are indigenous to Earth's atmosphere or interplanetary space. That, in turn, inspired Ivan T. Sanderson who became a vocal proponent of the hypothesis. In 1986, years after her death, her "space fish" theory was featured in the writings of Vincent Gaddis.

In 1973, she was recognized by Society for Psychical Research of Great Britain.
