= Frank Schwable =

United States Marine Corps general (1908–1988)

Frank Hawse Schwable
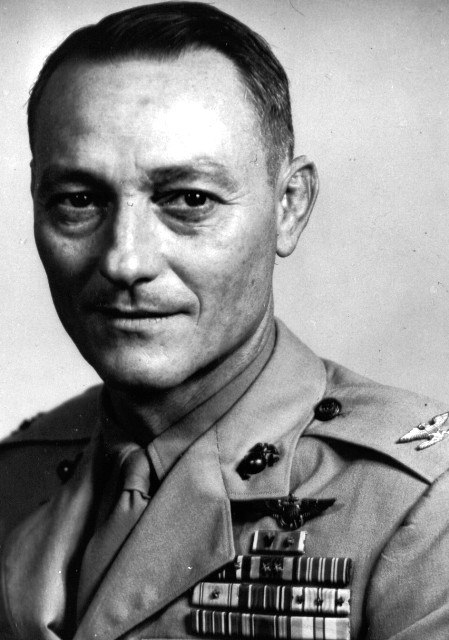
- Schwable as colonel, USMC
- Born: July 18, 1908
- Died: October 28, 1988 (aged 80)
- Military career
- Allegiance: United States of America
- Branch: United States Marine Corps
- Service years: 1929–1959
- Rank: Brigadier general
- Service number: 0-4429
- Commands: VMF(N)-531
- Conflicts: World War II; Korean War; MiG Alley
- Awards: Legion of Merit (3); Distinguished Flying Cross (4); Air Medal (3)

Brigadier General Frank Hawse Schwable (July 18, 1908 – October 28, 1988) was a decorated U.S. Marine pilot whose prosecution for collaborating with his Korean captors while a prisoner of war was dismissed in 1954.

== Biography ==
=== Early years ===
Schwable, the son of a Marine colonel who served thirty years, graduated from the United States Naval Academy in 1929.

=== Marine Corps Career ===
==== Commissioning and early years of service ====
He was awarded the Cross of Valor by the Nicaraguan government in 1932. In September 1933, he was among 19 aviators representing the Marine Corps at the International Air Races in Chicago.

==== World War II & post war activities ====
Just prior to the United States' entry into World War II, a number of Marine Aviators, to include Frank Schwable, travelled to Great Britain to learn about the fundamentals of radar, conducting ground-controlled interception, and the tactics and techniques necessary to successfully operate night fighters. Upon his return from England, Schwable was designated as the first commanding officer of Marine Night Fighting Squadron 531 (VMF(N)-531) which was commissioned on November 16, 1942 at Marine Corps Air Station Cherry Point, North Carolina. This was the Marine Corps first night fighter squadron. On April 1, 1943, Schwable was made the Commanding Officer of Marine Night Fighter Group 53 (MAG(N)-53. When VMF(N)-531 finally deployed overseas, Schwable relinquished Group command and reverted back to his role as squadron commander. VMF(N)-531 was the first combat squadron to leave MCAS Cherry Point. After layovers in Hawaii and Espiritu Santo, the squadron finally arrived at Renard Field on Banika in the Russell Islands on September 11, 1943. Joining Marine Aircraft Group 21, 1st Marine Aircraft Wing, the Grey Ghosts flew their first combat patrol on September 16, making them the first naval aviation night-fighter squadron to operate in the South Pacific.

On January 12, 1944, LtCol Schwable shot down a Japanese Nakajima B5N in the vicinity of Torokina Airfield. During his time overseas with -531, Schwable flew 72 combat missions and was credited with shooting down a total of four enemy aircraft.

He received the Legion of Merit for his service in World War II.

==== Korean War ====
While chief of staff of the First Marine Air Wing, Schwable and his co-pilot were reported missing on a combat mission in Korea in July 1952. On February 23, 1953, the Chinese broadcast charges that two officers, Schwable and his co-pilot, had said that the U.S. was conducting germ warfare. Schwable was quoted saying the purpose was "to test under field conditions various elements of bacteriological warfare and possibly to expand field tests at a later date into an element of regular combat operations." When Schwable was quoted confessing to germ warfare, his wife said, "That's the same old Communist malarkey. Nobody believes it."

United Nations commander General Mark W. Clark denounced China's germ warfare charges. Clark said, "Whether these statements ever passed the lips of these unfortunate men is doubtful. If they did, however, too familiar are the mind-annihilating methods of these Communists in extorting whatever words they want ... The men themselves are not to blame, and they have my deepest sympathy for having been used in this abominable way."

==== Post Captivity reckoning and later career ====
Schwable was released from captivity in September 1953. On April 27, 1954, Marine Corps Commandant General Lemuel C. Shepherd Jr. said he was "an instrument, however unwilling, of causing damage to his country" by the false confession that he later repudiated. At the board of inquiry that considered whether he merited court-martial, a recently released POW testified. He described how he was tortured during six months' captivity and said that in prosecuting Schwable they would be "persecut[ing] a man who has already been persecuted [and] would merely be playing into Communist hands." Winfred Overholser, former president of the American Psychiatric Association and longtime superintendent of St. Elizabeths Hospital, a federal mental facility, testified on his behalf.

The court of inquiry ultimately recommended no action against Schwable, but he was shifted, according to Shepherd, to "duties of a type making minimum demands upon the elements of unblemished personal example and leadership." On May 11 he was assigned to serve as the Marine Corps representative on the Navy's Flight Safety Board based in the Pentagon. The Marine Corps awarded Colonel Schwable its Legion of Merit for a third time on June 22, 1954, for his service as chief of staff to General Clayton C. Jerome in Korea for three months before his capture.

=== Retirement and later years ===
Schwable retired on June 30, 1959, as a brigadier general. He died on October 28, 1988, and is buried in Ebenezer Cemetery, Loudoun County, Virginia.

== Decorations ==

Naval Aviator Badge
1st Row	Legion of Merit with two Gold Stars and Combat "V"		Distinguished Flying Cross with three Gold Stars	
2nd Row	Air Medal with two Gold Stars	Prisoner of War Medal	Second Nicaraguan Campaign Medal	American Defense Service Medal with Base Clasp
3rd Row	European–African–Middle Eastern Campaign Medal	Asiatic-Pacific Campaign Medal with four service stars	American Campaign Medal	World War II Victory Medal
4th Row	National Defense Service Medal	Korean Service Medal with two service stars	Nicaraguan Cross of Valor	United Nations Korea Medal
