= Alfred Kalberer =

U.S. Air Force general

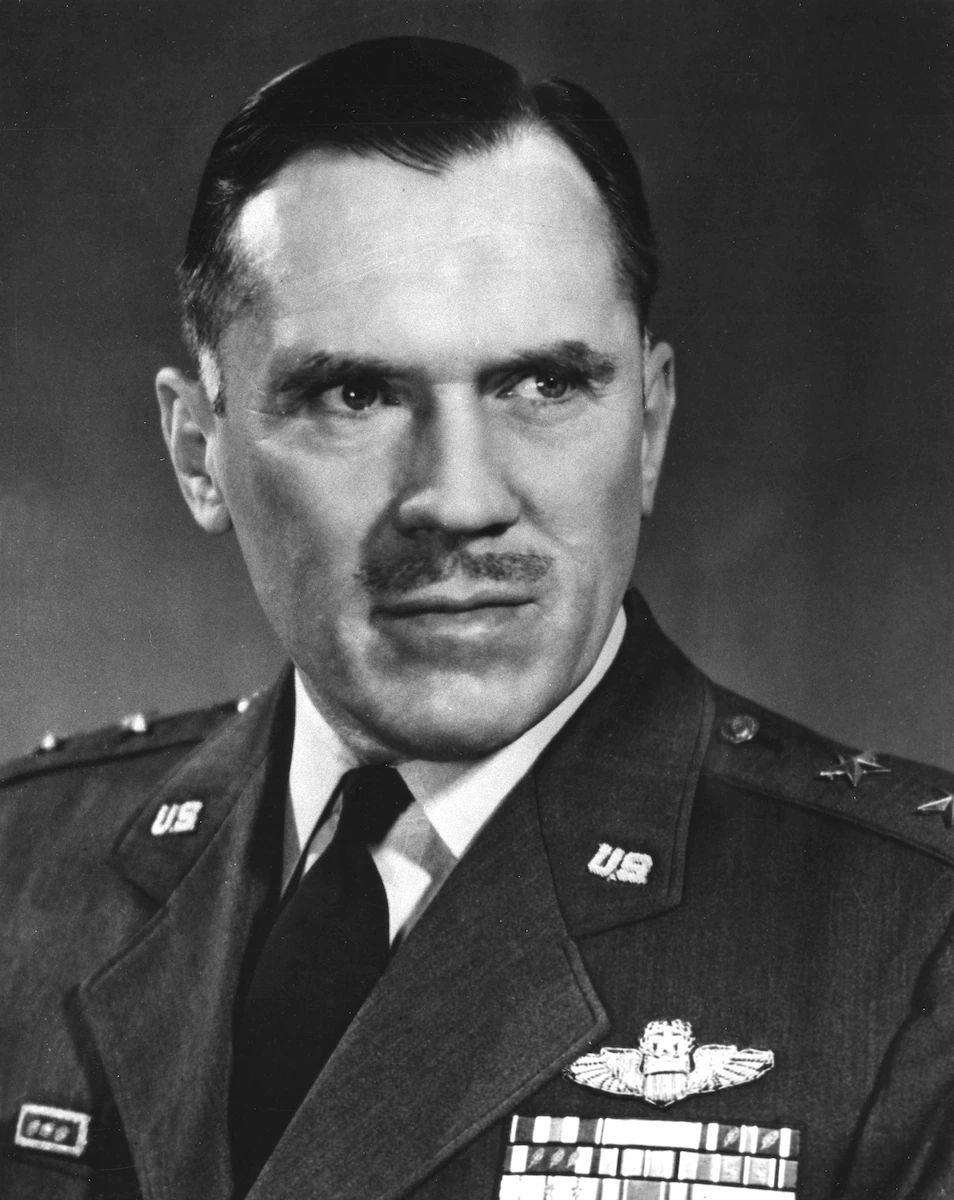
- Born: January 1, 1907; Lafayette, Indiana, U.S.
- Died: June 20, 1984 (aged 77) Bellevue, Nebraska, U.S.
- Allegiance: United States
- Branch: United States Army Air Corps; United States Army Air Forces; United States Air Force
- Service years: 1927-29, 1941-1963
- Conflicts: World War II; European Theater of Operations; Pacific Theatre
- Awards: Silver Star; Distinguished Flying Cross; Air Medal

Alfred Fredrick Kalberer (Jan 1, 1907 - Jun 20, 1984) was an American World War 2 bomber pilot, and later, an Air Force general at the U.S. Eighth Air Force and Strategic Air Command. During his career, Kalberer was awarded 26 military decorations, including the Order of the British Empire, the Silver Star, the Legion of Merit, the Air Medal, and the Distinguished Flying Cross.

== Early life ==
Alfred F. Kalberer was born at Lafayette, Indiana in 1907. After graduating from high school, he worked as an usher in a Chicago theater.

== Career ==
In 1927, Kalberer received an appointment as an air cadet. In 1928, while at Kelly Field, he was commissioned as reserve second lieutenant and assigned to the 1st Pursuit Group of Selfridge Field.

In 1929 he resigned from active duty and was hired by General Tire and Rubber to make a promotional tour of the United States, Mexico and Cuba. Kalberer then worked for the National Air Transport (later part of United Airlines) as an airmail pilot. In the mid-1930s, Kalberer left United for Royal Dutch Air Lines (KLM).

On December 10, 1941, Kalberer returned to active duty as a first lieutenant assigned to the Army Air Corps' Ferry Command. In June 1942, Kalberer was part of the bomber force that scored a number of hits against Italian capital ships; Accounts of the raid were featured in popular press. In September he was awarded the Silver Star. Kalberer was part of a raid on the Ploesti oil fields.

In June 1943, Kalberer was promoted to lieutenant colonel and entered the B-29 program. He was assigned to India as deputy commander of the B-29 equipped 462nd Bomb Group. In August 1944, the unit's commander was shot down, Kalberer assumed command and was promoted to full colonel.

In April 1946, Kalberer served as an intelligence officer at Bikini atomic tests. Kalberer authored an eyewitness account of the test that was published in popular press. In Fall of 1946, he was assigned to Headquarters of the Eighth Air Force at Fort Worth, Texas; From September 1946 to December 1947. He served as chief of intelligence for the Eighth.

From late 1947 to October 1948, Kalberer commanded the 55th Reconnaissance Group and again participated in atomic tests during the Sandstone Atomic Weapons Test at Eniwetok Atoll. Beginning in July 1948, Kalberer spent three years at the Headquarters of the Strategic Air Command as director of public relations and special assistant to its commander Curtis LeMay.

In December 1952, Kalberer was promoted to one-star general. In August 1955, Kaliber was given command of the 14th Air Division at Travis Air Force Base. He was appointed deputy commander, 15th Air Force and promoted to major general in August 1957.

On July 14, 1959, Kalberer became vice commander at Headquarters Continental Air Command. In 1960, Kalberer's anti-communist speech at a local Kiwanis club was published in the press. In July 1961, he was named chief of staff to the Allied Air Forces Southern Europe.

In 1963, Kalberer retired at the rank of Major General.

== Retirement and legacy ==
After retirement, Kalberer and his wife took up residence in Bellevue, Nebraska. The Air Force's Alfred W. Kalberer Outstanding Airman Award was named for the former general. His wife, Charlotte, died in 1975. Kalberer died on June 20, 1984.
