= Edward Adam Strecker =

American physician and professor of psychiatry (1886–1959)

Edward Adam Strecker, M.D. (1886–1959) was an American physician, a psychiatric educator, a professor of psychiatry at several medical schools, and a leader in American psychiatry during the mid-twentieth century.

Strecker was born in Philadelphia, Pennsylvania, and received his early education at parochial schools, including St. Joseph's College and La Salle College in Philadelphia. He entered Jefferson Medical College in Philadelphia in 1907, and graduated in 1911. After his internship at St. Agnes Hospital in Baltimore, Maryland, he joined the staff of the Pennsylvania Hospital (Philadelphia) in 1913. He also taught psychiatry at Jefferson Medical College where he was later appointed professor of psychiatry and neurology. In 1925, he moved to Yale University as professor of psychiatry and taught until 1931 when he returned to Philadelphia to resume teaching at Jefferson Medical College. In 1932, he accepted an appointment as professor and chair of psychiatry at the University of Pennsylvania Medical College, where he remained until retirement in 1952.

During World War I, Strecker entered the U.S. Army at the rank of major and served as a divisional psychiatrist in France. During World War II, he served as a consultant to the Army and was active in recruiting and training psychiatrists to serve in the Army.

Strecker played a major role in American psychiatry as a teacher, and he consulted for numerous government agencies and organizations. He was a member of the Philadelphia County Medical Society, the Pennsylvania Medical Society, the American College of Physicians, a member of the Board of Psychiatry and Neurology, the American Neurological Association (vice President, 1942), the American Psychiatric Association (president, 1943–1944), and a Fellow of the Royal Medico-Psychological Association of Great Britain. He delivered the Salmon Lecture of the New York Academy of Medicine in 1939. He was awarded honorary degrees from La Salle College (D.Litt.), St. Joseph's College (D.Sc.), and Franklin and Marshall College in Lancaster, Pennsylvania (LLD).

Strecker's professional writings reflect his active career. He published over 100 monographs and journal articles including his textbooks on psychiatry and neurology. His first textbook, Practical Clinical Psychiatry, was co-authored with Franklin Ebaugh, professor of psychiatry at Colorado Medical School, and had eight editions (1940–1957). Strecker later wrote Fundamentals of Psychiatry with other professionals, and the book had six editions (1942–1952). His teaching was based on a case record approach which followed Adolph Meyer, M.D. professor of psychiatry at the Johns Hopkins School of Medicine in Baltimore, Maryland. Meyer believed that psychiatric illness was part of the life trajectory of the patient. While Strecker's early publications were based on descriptive psychiatry, his later monographs and articles included the contributions of psychoanalytic theory and practice in the understanding and treatment of mental illness.

Strecker retired from teaching in 1952. He died of lung cancer in Jefferson Hospital in 1959.

== Works ==
- Strecker, Edward A. "An Evaluation of Paraphrenia," New York Medical Journal (August 1916).
- Strecker, Edward A. "The Continuous Bath in Mental Disease," Journal of the American Medical Association LXVIII (16 June 1917): 1796–1799.
- Strecker, Edward A., and Franklin G. Ebaugh. Practical Clinical Psychiatry for Students and Practitioners. Philadelphia, Blakiston, 1925.
- Strecker, Edward A., and Kenneth E. Appel. Discovering Ourselves: A View of the Human Mind and How it Works. New York, The Macmillan Co., 1931.
- Chaplin, Hugh, and Edward A. Strecker. Signs of Health in Childhood. New York, American Child Health Association, 1934.
- Appel, Kenneth E., and Edward A. Strecker. Practical Examination of Personality and Behavior Disorders: Adults and Children. New York, Macmillan, 1936.
- Strecker, Edward A., and Francis Taylor Chambers. Alcohol: One Man's Meat. New York, The Macmillan Co., 1938.
- Strecker, Edward A. Beyond the Clinical Frontiers: A Psychiatrist Views Crowd Behavior. New York: W.W. Norton & Co., 1940.
- Strecker, Edward A. Fundamentals of Psychiatry. Philadelphia: Lippincott, [1942].
- Strecker, Edward A., and Kenneth E. Appel. Psychiatry in Modern Warfare. New York, The Macmillan Co., 1945.
- Strecker, Edward A. Their Mother's Sons: The Psychiatrist Examines an American Problem. Philadelphia, Lippincott, 1946.
- Strecker, Edward A. Basic Psychiatry. New York: Random House, 1952.
- Strecker, Edward A., and Vincent T. Lathbury. Their Mother's Daughters. Philadelphia, Lippincott, 1956.
