= Salting a bird's tail =

Superstition and idiom

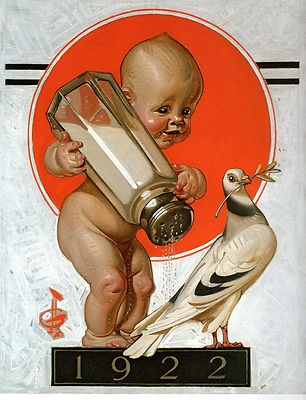
The new year of 1922 preventing the dove of peace from flying away

Salting a bird's tail is a legendary superstition in Europe and America, and an English language idiom. The superstition is that sprinkling salt on a bird's tail will render the bird temporarily unable to fly, enabling its capture.

The nursery rhyme "Simple Simon", which dates to at least the 17th century and possibly earlier, includes the verse:

He went to catch a dicky bird,
And thought he could not fail,
Because he had a little salt,
To put upon its tail.

The belief itself is documented to the 16th century, and may be older. Found in European countries such as Sweden, it also crossed the ocean to North America. It is generally told to children, and not commonly believed any more by adults. In "Simple Simon", the point is made even then only a simpleton would believe the legend.

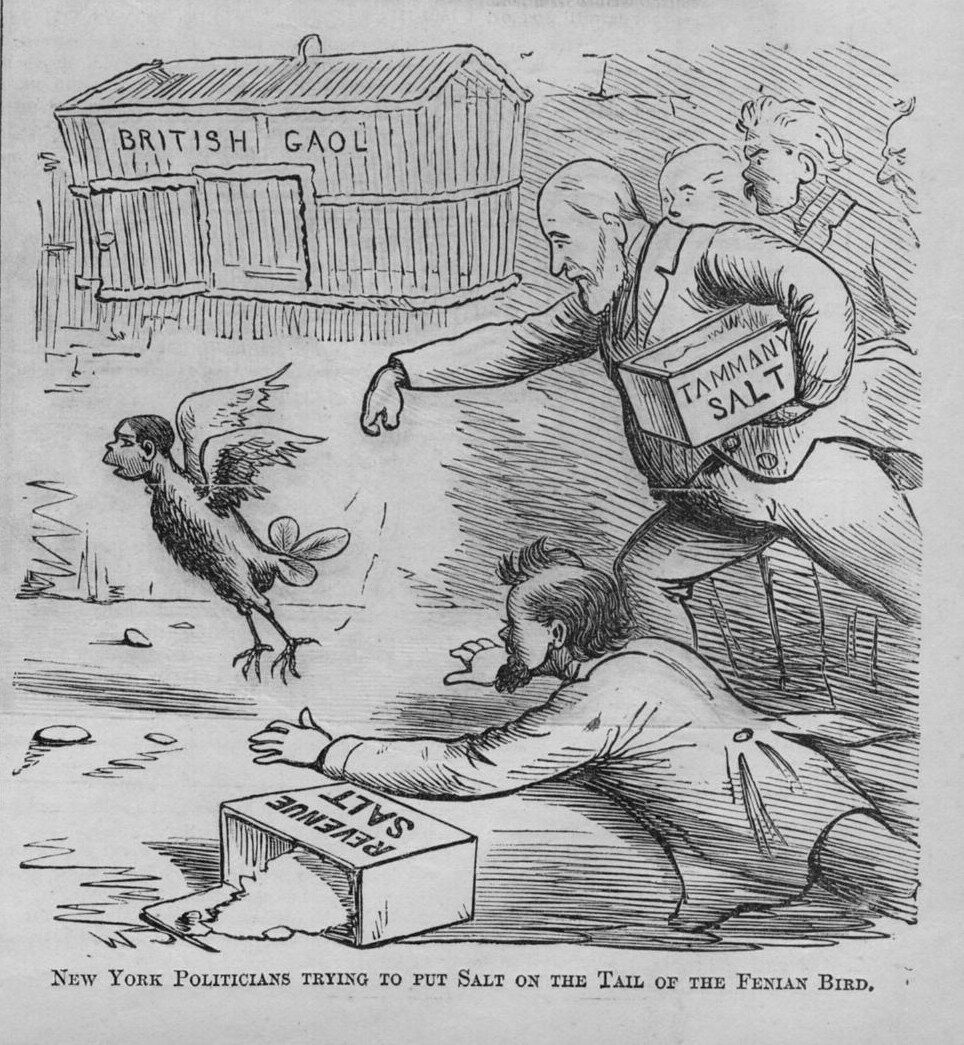
Tammany Hall tries to immobilize the American Fenian Brotherhood for capture and deportation (1871 cartoon)

Salting of a bird's tail has been used by analogy as an idiom for immobilizing someone since at least the 19th century, by writers such as Walter Scott, Robert Burns, Walter Lantz, and John Phillips with his song “No Salt On Her Tail”, performed by The Mamas & the Papas. Another example is "Ye'll ne'er cast saut on his tail" ("You'll never cast salt on his tail"), a Scottish proverb of unknown antiquity.
