= Winfred Overholser =

American psychiatrist

Winfred Overholser (1892 – October 6, 1964) was an American psychiatrist, president of the American Psychiatric Association, and for 25 years the superintendent of St. Elizabeths Hospital, a federal institution for the mentally ill in Washington, D.C.

Born in Worcester, Massachusetts, in 1892, Winfred Overholser graduated from Harvard College in 1912 and received a medical degree from Boston University in 1916.

He was Commissioner of the Massachusetts Department of Mental Diseases and worked with the National Committee for Mental Hygiene in New York.

In 1940, he and his colleague Harry Stack Sullivan, as members of the American Psychiatric Association's Committee on Military Mobilization, formulated guidelines for the psychological screening of inductees to the United States military.

He campaigned for recognition of alcoholism as a mental disease, calling it in 1940 "the greatest public health problem which is not being scientifically attacked. As early as 1941 he warned of the need to consider the mental health of an aging population and said that old age pensions could prove to be "one of the most important developments in the prevention of mental breakdowns in later life."

He served as superintendent of St. Elizabeths Hospital, a federal institution for the mentally ill in Washington, D.C., from 1937 to 1962. His most famous patient there was Ezra Pound. In 1947, he agreed to move Pound to the more pleasant surroundings of Chestnut Ward, close to his private quarters, which is where he spent the next twelve years. He was instrumental in Pound's release in 1958, after reporting that there was a "strong probability" that criminal insanity explained his crime and that "further confinement can serve no therapeutic purpose." He also testified on behalf of Frank H. Schwable, a Marine who, while held prisoner by North Korea, confessed to participating in germ warfare.

He served in 1948 as president of the American Psychiatric Association. He was for a time the editor in chief of the Quarterly Review of Psychiatry and Neurology. In 1949, he provided a pessimistic assessment of the prospects for St. Elizabeth's patients who had been subject to lobotomies. He told a professional conference: "I am sorry to say that even when they are improved, they are still nothing to brag about. We are not enthusiastic."

Overholser retired in 1962 after 25 years as superintendent of St. Elizabeths Hospital where under his administration the hospital pioneered the use of "group therapy, tranquillizing drugs and psychodrama."

He was also Professor Emeritus of Psychiatry of George Washington University School of Medicine & Health Sciences.

As Chairman of the American Psychiatric Association, Overholser concluded that United States Secretary of Defense James Forrestal "came to his death by suicide while in a state of mental depression".

Boston University award him its alumni medal in 1962. He received as well the United States Selective Service Medal. France awarded him its Legion of Honor and Medal of Liberation.

He died on October 6, 1964. His wife and three children survived him.

== Works ==
- Psychiatry and the Courts in Massachusetts (1928)
- Handbook of Psychiatry (1947)
- The Psychiatrist and the Law (1953)
- Twenty Years of Psychodrama at Saint Elizabeths Hospital (NY: Beacon House, 1960), with James M Enneis
- Centennial Papers, St. Elizabeths Hospital, 1855-1955 (Washington: Centennial Commission, Saint Elizabeth's Hospital, 1956])
- History of Money (self-published) Libertyville, Ill., 1936.
