= Trevor James Constable =

New Zealand UFO writer (1925–2016)

Trevor James Constable (17 September 1925 − 31 March 2016) was an early UFO writer who believed that the UFO phenomenon was best explained by the presence of enormous amoeba-like animals inhabiting Earth's atmosphere. A native of Wellington, New Zealand, he served 31 years at sea, 26 of them as a radio officer in the U.S. merchant marine. He authored several books on the aerial warfare of World War II, together with co-author Raymond Toliver.

== Authorship on World War II ==
Constable was an author who produced 10 non-fiction books, many well known to aficionados of famous fighter aces. His co-author on these works was Colonel (ret.) Raymond "Ray" F. Toliver (1914−2006), a former U.S. Air Force pilot and official historian of the American Fighter Aces Association. Their work on German fighter ace Erich Hartmann, The Blond Knight of Germany, was described by historians Ronald Smelser and Edward J. Davies in their work The Myth of the Eastern Front as a "hallmark of romanization", with its "insidious" title suggesting medieval chivalry that "not only fails to characterize the conduct of the Wehrmacht during the Soviet-German war, but, indeed, marks its opposite".

The historian Jens Wehner notes that the 1971 book by Constable and Toliver on Hartmann, published in German as Holt Hartmann vom Himmel! Die Geschichte des erfolgreichsten Jagdfliegers der Welt, was immensely popular in Germany, but contained serious flaws in terms of presentation of historical realities. These included the uncritical borrowing from the Nazi propaganda elements of the Fliegerassen ("aces") and stereotypes about the Soviet Union. According to Wehner, the latter could be traced to the prevailing attitudes during the Cold War. Further, the political and social consequences of World War II were completely ignored.

== UFO hypothesis ==
After reading about radionics and Wilhelm Reich's orgone, Constable became convinced that supposed UFOs were in fact living organisms. He set out to prove his theory by taking a camera with him, fitted with an ultra-violet lens and high-speed film. The processed pictures showed signs of discolouration, which Constable insisted were proof of amoeba-like animals inhabiting the sky.

Reviewing his new found 'evidence', Constable was moved to write in two books that the creatures, though not existing outside of the "infrared range of the electromagnetic spectrum", had been on this Earth since it was more gaseous than solid. He claimed that the creatures belonged to a new offshoot of evolution, and that the species should be classified under macrobacteria. According to Constable, the creatures could be the size of a coin or as large as half-a-mile across.

The biology of the creatures supposedly meant that they were visible to radar, even when not to the naked eye. To explain supposed cattle (and occasionally human) mutilations, Constable theorised that the use of radar angered the organisms, who would become predatory when provoked. At a later date a crypto-zoologist officially classified these supposed creatures as Amoebae constablea, named after their discoverer. Constable wrote a book entitled The Cosmic Pulse of Life in 1975 that outlined his ideas. Constable noted he did not originate the hypothesis, and he described John Philip Bessor as the "grand-daddy" of the "space critter" hypothesis.

== Work with TJC/Atmos Engineers ==
In 1991 Constable worked with the local Malaccan government on a project to fill the Durian Tunggal Dam.

He and the company promoted the idea that they had created a 'rain-making' technology, which employed "metal cylinders placed in cones and modified gadgets", which would then alter the ether or 'chi' of the atmosphere. The benefits of using such a device were touted as avoiding electromagnetism or radioactive substances being placed into the country's air. Constable did express concern at having to use the devices for a localised area, saying that "it's like trying to put rain in a small container".

Constable claimed that his technology and methods had already been used to fill the Gibraltar Dam in California.

In the earlier stages of the operation there were apparently not yet any notable results in filling the reservoir, and some Malacca residents blamed evil spirits, which were fighting against the attempts to align the atmosphere. Constable said he believed "there could be some truth in the rumours", but he was confident that his technology could overcome the obstacle.

The Malaysian government eventually began a probe into TJC/Atmos Engineers to look into whether there was any evidence that the State government had been cheated. In total the local government had paid them $3.2 million. However, the following was reported on Aug 14, 1991 in the New Straits Times, "TJC Atmos Engineers was hired by the Malacca Government to solve the State's water problems by filling up the 28-metre Durian Tunggal dam which dried up in January. They will be paid $3.2 Million if they succeed and half if the dam is half full by the end of next month. The operation started on July 1. Mr. Constable described the contract to undertake the operation in Malacca as totally contingent - no result, no pay." It would appear then that if the Malacca Government paid out the full amount of $3.2 Million to TJC/Atmos Engineers, that they would have been deemed to have fulfilled the full contractual obligations for receiving that sum of money.

== Publications ==
- They Live in the Sky! (as Trevor James). Los Angeles: New Age Publishing Co. (1958).
- Fighter Aces of the Luftwaffe, with Raymond F. Toliver. London: Arthur Barker (1968).

Reissued: Atglen, PA: Schiffer (1996). ISBN 978-0887409097.

- The Blond Knight of Germany: A Biography of Erich Hartmann, with Raymond F. Toliver. Introduction by Adolf Galland. Blue Ridge Summit, PA: Tab Aero (1970). ISBN 978-0830681891.
- The Cosmic Pulse of Life: The Revolutionary Biological Power Behind UFOs (as Trevor James). Santa Ana, CA: Merlin Press (1976).

Revised and re-edited edition published as Sky Creatures: Living UFOs (Pocket, 1978).
