= John Philip Bessor =

John Philip Bessor (January 15, 1914 – February 2, 1989) was a prolific correspondent and author for Fate Magazine. He is remembered for his space animal hypothesis, first put forward in 1947, that "flying saucers" might be biological animals rather than technological spacecraft.

== Early life and career ==
Bessor was born in Zelienople, Pennsylvania to George W. and Martha Blymer Bessor. In 1932, he graduated from Zelienople High School, having served as Art Editor for the yearbook and performed in chorus, operas, and plays. He attended the Edinoboro State Teachers College, majoring in art instruction, and he took a course sculpture and design at the Carnegie Institute. Bessor's obituary listed him as working for the Walt Disney Studio as an illustrator before being employed by Lockheed and Aetna-Standard Engineering in Ellwood City.

== Writings ==
In 1949, Bessor wrote a letter that was published in the Saturday Evening Post; Bessor speculated "flying saucers" were actually space animals "more like octopuses, in mentality, than humans". In July 1949, Bessor authored a letter to the Air Force's Project Saucer. In September, a letter he wrote about Chimney Rock and Brown Mountain lights was published in the Asheville, North Carolina papers.

In January 1950, Fate magazine published Bessor's piece on Harry Price and the investigation of the Borley Rectory haunting. In June 1950, he promoted his theory that flying saucers are animals. In March 1951, Fate featured "Mystery of Brown Mountain", his piece on his North Carolina investigation. A letter from Bessor on flying saucers was published in Fate in May 1951. In September 1951, an article about "Psychic Healing" by Bessor was published in the "Psychic Observer".

The April 28, 1952 edition of Life Magazine published a letter from Bessor in response to the article "Have We Visitors from Space?. Wrote Bessor: "For five years I have held the theory that these aerial objects represent a highly attenuated form of intelligent ‘animal’ life of extra-terrestrial origin—possibly stratospheric or ionospheric; propulsion apparently akin to teleportation, possibly flight by sheer will or thought. The frequent undulating motion in flight is analogous to the weaving trajectory of observed poltergeist-projected objects. Strange, luminous creatures inhabit the depths of our seas, why not similar creatures of highly rarefied matter in the heights of our heavens, and as diverse in size and shape as living things on earth?"

The March 1953 issue of Fate saw two pieces by Bessor: "The Battle of the Clouds" about an 1874 aerial anomaly over Saw Mill Run, Pennsylvania and "Restless Spirits." In June, a letter to the Editor was published in which Bessor urged journalists to continue investigating flying saucer reports. In August of that year, Fate magazine published “Mysterious Lights of Australia” and a letter about flying saucers. In 1953-54, letters by Bessor published in Miami Herald, The Pittsburgh Press and the Washington Daily News in which he accused a faction of the Air Force of covering up the truth about flying saucers. In July 1955, Fate published “A Dead Man Returned to Life”, and in August, Saucer News published Bessor's article on UFOs and levitation.In December, Fate published the Bessor article "Are the Saucers Space Animals?" The following March the magazine printed another letter by Bessor.

In 1955, Bessor was quoted as saying "although an avid researcher since June 1947, I have not been able to uncover a single shred of proof spacemen have conversed with humans." In 1956, press covered his interesting in ghosts. In 1957, a letter by Bossor promoting flying saucers was published in the Chicago Tribune

In 1967, the twentieth anniversary of the modern flying saucer era, Bessor and his hypothesis were featured in Mysterious Fires and Lights by Vincent Gaddis and What We Really Know About Flying Saucers by Otto Binder. That year, his biological hypothesis of flying saucers was widely covered in national media. In November 1967, Fate published another article by Bessor on his hypothesis, this piece titled: “UFOs, Animal or Mineral?

In 1970, he reported a UFO over Gulfport, Mississippi. In 1971, he authored a letter complaining about light pollution. In 1978, he authored a piece arguing Hiroshima was worse the Pearl Harbor. In 1986, he authored a letter on electronic voice phenomenon.

== Influence and legacy ==
Bessor is primarily remembered as the originator of his biological hypothesis of UFOs. Bessor was cited as an influence in the writings of Morris K. Jessup, who similarly entertained the hypothesis that UFO reports might represent a newly-discovered biological species rather than technological spacecraft. Bessor's writings influenced Trevor James Constable, who expounded the theory that flying saucers were organic life forms in his 1958 book "They Live in the Sky". Constable described Bessor as the "grand-daddy" of the "space critter" hypothesis. In 1967, the same year Bessor and Constable's theories were discussed nation-wide, Ivan T. Sanderson authored Uninvited Visitors: A Biologist Looks at UFOs, which made a similar argument. It has been argued that Bessor's writings may have indirectly inspired the 2022 Jordan Peele film Nope.
