= Alfred Loedding =

- Born: Alfred Christian Loedding; February 17, 1906; Princeton, New Jersey, U.S.
- Died: October 10, 1963 (aged 57); Albuquerque, New Mexico, U.S.
- Education: Auburn University (BS, 1929)
- Known for: Project Sign, Low-aspect-ratio aircraft (Lenticular aircraft), Flying disc designs
- Title: Technical Director, Project Sign
- Scientific career
- Fields: Aerospace engineering, Aeronautics
- Workplaces: Wright-Patterson Air Force Base; Bell Aircraft; Loedding Engineering Co.

Loedding in 1938

Alfred Christian Loedding (February 17, 1906 – October 10, 1963) was an American aeronautical engineer. He was a pioneer in the development of solid-fuel rockets.

== Early life ==
In 1928, Loedding was vice-president of the student flying club and was profiled for a model he made of Charles Lindbergh's plane The Spirit of St. Louis. In 1929, Loedding graduated from the Alabama Polytechnic Institute with a Bachelor of Science in mechanical engineering. He subsequently completed advanced studies in aeronautical engineering at New York University's Daniel Guggenheim School of Aeronautics in 1930. He received the school's Guggenheim award. He was commissioned as a second lieutenant in the air service.

== Career ==
In 1937, he was employed by Bellanca Aircraft. He was profiled for his work on rocket planes. From 1938 to 1950, the Army Air Force, later US Air Force. For three years he led the Jet Propulsion Lab at Wright Field. He was involved in the development of solid-fueled rockets. In 1939, he was involved in model plane contests, serving both as a judge and an award-winning participant. In 1941, he accompanied Robert Goddard to Roswell army airfield for a test. He later observed tests conducted by Jack Parsons and Aerojet. Loedding was involved in Project Sign, the Air Force's investigation into flying discs or UFOs. He conducted a 1949 lecture at University of Pittsburgh. In 1958, Loedding was profiled after being awarded a patent for a solid-fueled military rocket. In 1959, he was profiled and photographed with a model he called a 'flying pumpkin seed'.

Loedding was instrumental to the development of air-to-air refueling systems. Loedding died in 1963. In 2013, his son Donald Loedding published a book that discussed his famous father.
