= Flight 105 =

Flight 105 may refer to:

Listed chronologically

- Pennsylvania Central Airlines Flight 105, crashed on 6 January 1946
- Flight 105 UFO sighting, reported by crew members of United Airlines Flight 105 on 4 July 1947
- Aeroflot Flight 105, crashed on 9 June 1958
- Britannia Airways Flight 105, crashed on 1 September 1966
- Midwest Express Airlines Flight 105, crashed on 6 September 1985

== See also ==
- STS-105, a successful Space Shuttle mission in August 2001
