= Cultural tracking =

Cultural changes reflected in UFO reports

In ufology, cultural tracking is the tendency of UFO reports through time to change their content in line with cultural changes.

== Examples ==
Unidentified flying objects have long been reported through history, but the claimed craft are always a perversion of the technology or fiction of the day, and "the UFO technology tracks what our culture has but rarely exceeds it by a great deal." When aviation was limited to hot-air balloons, UFO reports consisted of claims of mysterious airships. Reported in the 1890s, these airships were distinguished from our technology by their giant size, but they nevertheless needed propellers. The later flying saucers were also a weird version of then-current aerospace technology; as John Spencer notes in The UFO Encyclopedia: "Witnesses aboard flying saucers have reported, for example, chunky number counters on the saucer control panels, but we did not have reports of liquid quartz readouts until we ourselves invented them."

Reports also track the science fiction prevalent at the time. Claims of UFOs stopping car engines and lights did not appear until a similar effect featured in the 1951 film The Day the Earth Stood Still. Similarly, the film Close Encounters of the Third Kind had the effect of standardizing accounts of grey aliens with entirely black eyes, though these were the invention of the film's special effects man, Carlo Rambaldi.

== Explanations ==
Cultural tracking appears to discredit a simple extraterrestrial hypothesis (ETH) as an explanation of UFOs. The psychosocial hypothesis (PSH) rejects the idea that UFOs are alien craft, and posits the simplest explanation: the UFOs and their occupants are imaginary. However, some believers in alien visitation embraced the idea of cultural tracking, claiming that advanced "ultraterrestrials" are capable of deliberately changing how they appear to humans. Advocates of this "interdimensional hypothesis" (IDH) believe that these beings might sometimes present themselves in the manner of 1950s sci-fi, but they could also appear as fairies, angels, ghosts or any other supernatural beings. However, they may disagree as to the aliens' motives for doing this. Jacques Vallee in the book Passport to Magonia, and John Keel, in his 1970 book Operation Trojan Horse, are sometimes seen as the instigators of this trend.

== See also ==
- Psychosocial hypothesis
