= Bertrand Méheust =

French sociologist and author (born 1947)

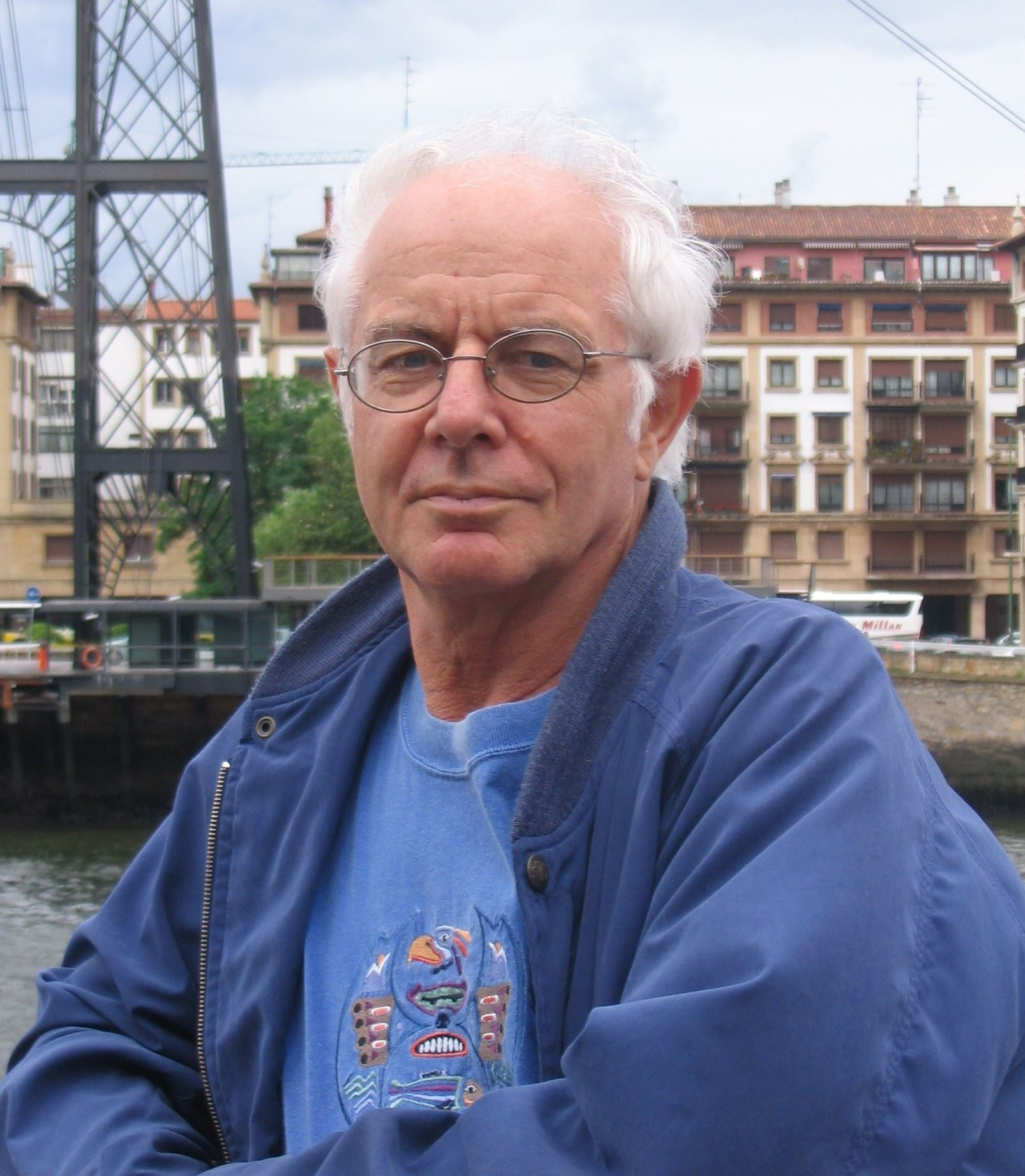
- Bertrand Méheust in 2008
- Born: July 12, 1947 (age 78)
- Occupations: Writer, sociologist

Bertrand Méheust (born 12 July 1947) is a French writer, specializing in parapsychology. He is a retired professor of philosophy and has a doctorate in sociology. He is a member of the steering committee of Institut Métapsychique International.

== Personal life ==
Bertrand Méheust was born in 1947. He grew up near Diges, Yonne, in north-central France. As a child, he was influenced Jules Verne's novels and the 1950s UFO sightings in France. He credits a 1971 meeting with French writer Aimé Michel in motivating him to pursue studies in philosophy. Méheust earned a doctorate of sociology from Paris 1 Panthéon-Sorbonne University in 1997.

== Work ==
In 1978, Bertrand Méheust released the book, Science Fiction et Soucoupes Volantes (Science Fiction and Flying Saucers). The book raised the question of whether science fiction anticipated the UFO phenomenon. Méheust found that pulp magazines wrote about and illustrated fictional flying saucers decades before the initial 1947 wave of reports. The book is regularly cited by skeptics who see it as evidence for the Psychosocial UFO hypothesis. Méhuest was influenced by psychoanalyst Carl Jung, author of Flying Saucers: A Modern Myth of Things Seen in the Skies (1959).

In 1999, his two volume academic thesis Somnambulisme et médiumnité (Sleepwalking and mediumship) was published. The book takes stock of controversies raised by parapsychology and psychology. It covers the history of research, theories, and concepts around hidden human potential going back to the 1700s. Méheust is a leading French expert in metaphysics. From this metaphysical perspective, he wrote the book Devenez savants: découvrez les sorciers about the study of psychological and paranormal phenomenon. It is a response to Debunked!—Devenez sorciers, devenez savants in the original French—a skeptical criticism of pseudosciences by physicist Georges Charpak.

Méheust has argued that the widespread modern Western rejection of the types of occult phenomenon recorded in previous centuries and other parts of the world has caused those phenomenon to become socially impossible. According to Méheust, a culture will create social practices that determine what is possible or impossible within that culture. The scientific consensus is that there is not sufficient evidence to support the existence of psi phenomena.

== Publications ==
- Méheust, Bertrand (1978). Science-fiction et soucoupes volantes - Une réalité mythico-physique. Mercure de France. ISBN 978-2715211308.
- Méheust, Bertrand (1992). Soucoupes Volantes et Folklore. Ed. Imago. ISBN 2-902702-71-X.
- Méheust, Bertrand (1999). Somnambulisme et médiumnité. Vol. 1. Institut Synthélabo pour le progrès de la connaissance. ISBN 2843240662. Méheust, Bertrand (1999). Somnambulisme et médiumnité. Vol. 1. Institut Synthélabo pour le progrès de la connaissance. ISBN 2843240689.
- Méheust, Bertrand (2000). Retour sur l' "Anomalie belge. le Livre bleu éd. ISBN 2-912607-01-9.
- Duits, Emmanuel-Juste; Raulet, Eric (May 2002). "Le phénomène Ovni - Métamorphose d'une mythe et émergence d'une réalité (debate with Jacques Vallée)". Paranormal entre mythes et réalités. ISBN 978-2844541451.
- Méheust, Bertrand (2003). Un voyant prodigieux – Alexis Didier, 1826-1886. Les Empêcheurs de penser en rond. ISBN 978-2846710503.
- Méheust, Bertrand (2004). Devenez savants : découvrez les sorciers - lettre à George Charpak. Les Empêcheurs de penser en rond. ISBN 978-2846710503.
- Méheust, Bertrand; Zafiropoulos, Markos; Rabeyron, Paul-Louis (2004). "Voyance et Divination, approches plurielles". Le Mythe : Pratiques, récits, théories. Vol. 3. ISBN 978-2717848984.
- Méheust, Bertrand (2005). 100 Mots pour comprendre la voyance. les Empêcheurs de penser en rond. ISBN 978-2846710909.
- Nathan, Tobie (2006). "Le dégout et l'effroi, La nécessité d'un changement d'alliance". La guerre des psys, Manifeste pour une Psychothérapie Démocratique. ISBN 978-2846711494.
- Méheust, Bertrand (2006). Histoires paranormales du Titanic. J'ai lu. ISBN 978-2290347089.
- Meheust, Bertrand (2009). La Politique de l'oxymore. La Découverte. ISBN 9782707185297.
- Méheust, Bertrand (2011). Les miracles de l'esprit : Qu'est ce que les voyants peuvent nous apprendre ?. La Découverte. ISBN 978-2359250428.
- Méheust, Bertrand (2012). La nostalgie de l'Occupation : Peut-on encore se rebeller contre les nouvelles formes d'asservissement ?. La Découverte. ISBN 978-2359250534.
- Méheust, Bertrand (2015). Jésus thaumaturge. Enquête sur l'homme et ses miracles. InterEditions. ISBN 9782729615376.
