= Psychological perspectives on UFO claims =

Claims of sighting, visitation, and contact with extraterrestrial or paranormal-connected unidentified flying objects (UFOs) has been the subject of extensive medical and psychological research. While most sightings are explainable as misidentification, some research indicates potential psychological origins for a portion of such claims.

== Psychiatry and UFO claims ==
Some studies have indicated that "experiencers" — persons alleging face-to-face contact with extraterrestrials (ETs) or vehicles purportedly controlled by ETs — have a different psychological profile to non-experiencers.

=== Research ===
In a 1983 paper in the Canadian Journal of Psychiatry, a group of six persons who alleged contact with extraterrestrials were examined. The study's authors determined that "five of them suffered from a paranoid delusional state often akin to paraphrenia".

According to sociologist Troy A. Zimmer writing in 1985 in the scholarly journal Deviant Behavior, the "cultural rejection" hypothesis is a common psychological framework used to explain UFO belief, and posits "that UFO believers are social marginals and cultural 'outsiders' who express their alienation by adopting deviant beliefs" while a competing "disturbed psyche" hypothesis "holds that UFO believers are distressed, troubled, unhappy, or maladjusted persons susceptible to 'primitive' thinking and delusions".

A 1994 study found 57% (thirteen out of twenty-three) of the subjects in a sample of abduction experiences reported an attempted suicide.

A 1997 study by researchers at the University of Essex found that "UFO-related beliefs are associated with the schizotypy construct", a model that may indicate a person's risk of developing schizophrenia or other psychotic disorders.

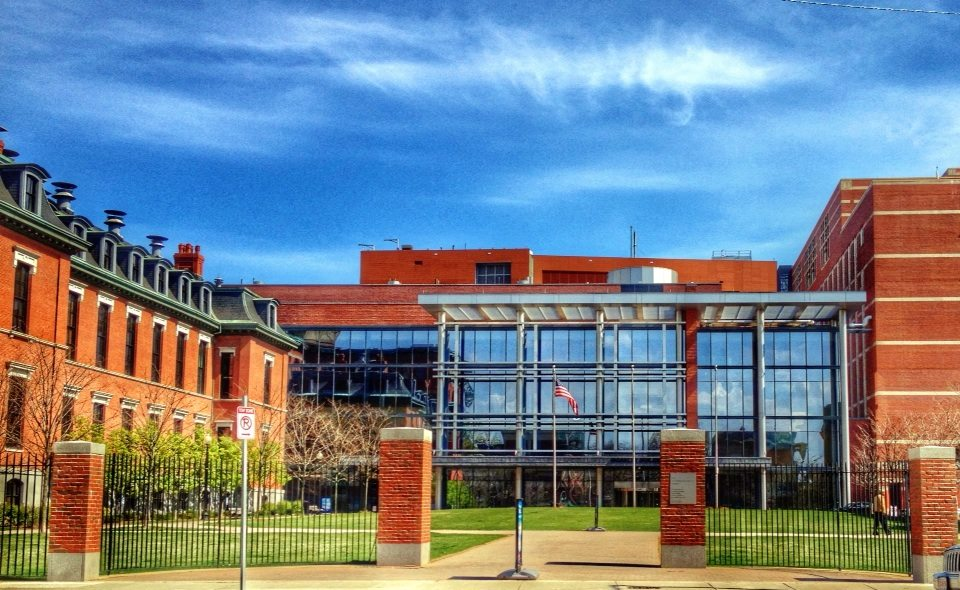
In 2000, a case of shared psychotic disorder involving a belief in alien abductions was treated at Boston University Medical Center (pictured).

According to the results of a 2008 study published in the journal Cortex, members of a study group of 19 persons who alleged alien abduction showed higher levels of dissociativity and tendency to hallucinate than a control group of non-"abductees".

=== Individual experiencers ===
A 2000 case study by a psychiatrist at Boston University Medical Center reported on the case of shared psychotic disorder by a married couple who both claimed to have been abducted by aliens. The husband had previously received mental health support following attempted suicide and the couple had a documented interest in UFOs. In the husband's case, this interest predated his earliest claimed abductions which first onset with his marriage. The wife, who believed she was an alien in a human body, claimed such encounters since before her marriage. The two patients' shared delusion fed each other's beliefs until it was "owned by them as a believable symbiotic creation". After the wife died, the husband persisted in his beliefs, possibly due to reinforcing messages he received from a group of six co-believers whom he had befriended. The psychiatrist noted that "the bond was strong enough for one of the six to visit him in a locked psychiatric unit".

A 2008 case, reported by physicians at the University of Louisville, involved an adult woman who reported difficulty sleeping due to her persistent belief that aliens kidnapped her at night. The patient's belief that she was being abducted began when she was approximately eight years old and read a book about alien abductions, and she later joined "a group of professed alien abductees". It was determined that the patient suffered from sleep paralysis and her belief in her abductions was due to post traumatic stress disorder (PTSD) resulting from the paralysis and reinforced by cultural acclimation to alien abduction as a phenomenon. The patient was referred to psychotherapy which improved her condition.

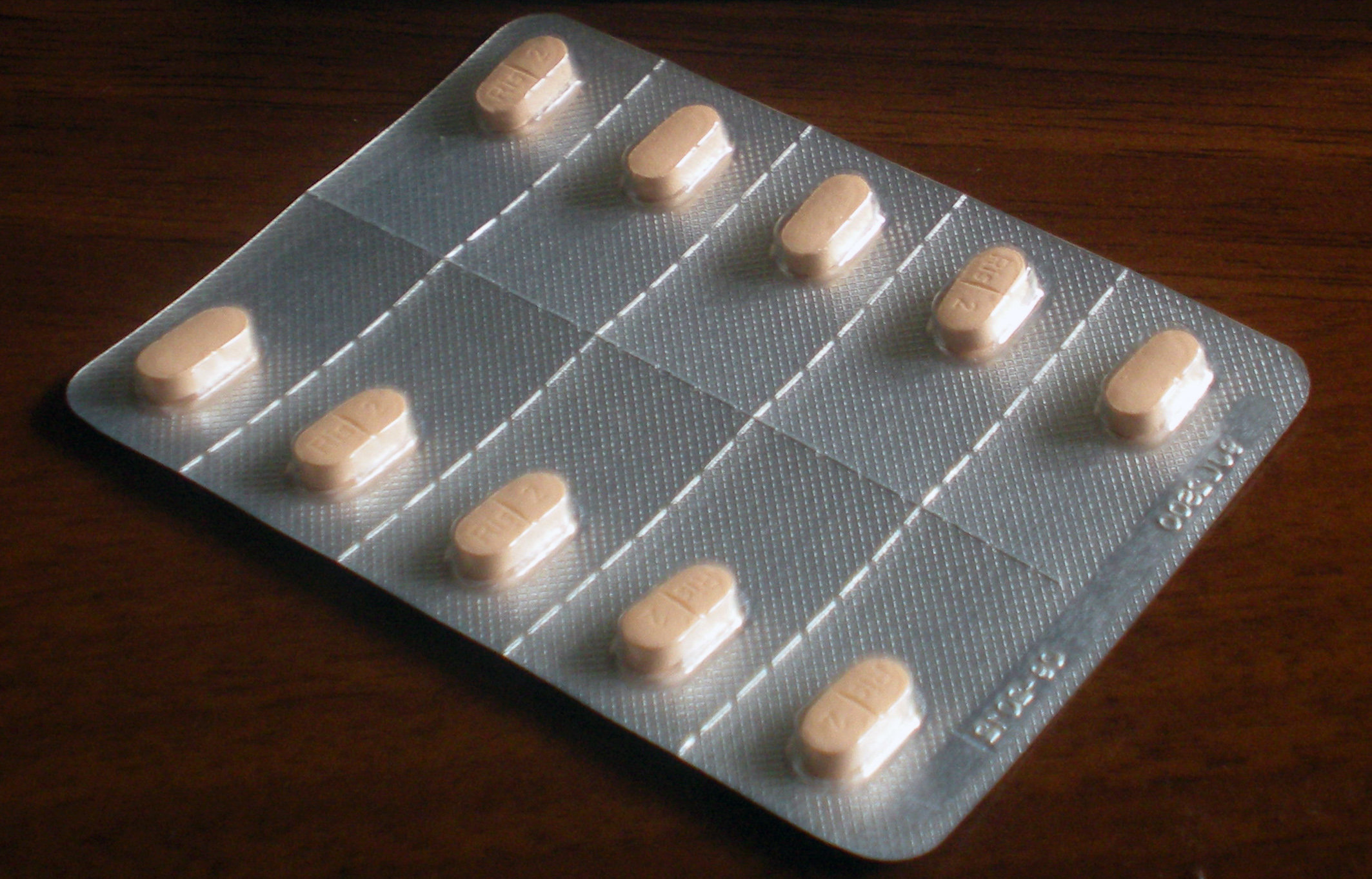
Risperidone (pictured) was prescribed to treat the 2023 case of a 17-year-old boy who felt "as if he is being chased by Martians".

A single case study authored by physicians at Nova Southeastern University in 2023 reported the case of a 17-year-old boy who felt "as if he is being chased by Martians". After all other potential causes were ruled out, the patient — whose paternal grandmother suffered bipolar disorder — was diagnosed with schizophrenia and prescribed risperidone, a course of cognitive behavioral therapy, and counseled to terminate his use of marijuana.

== Personality and UFO claims ==
Persons with a fantasy-prone personality spend a significant portion of their lives involved in fantasy and may confuse or mix their fantasies with their real life. Though they are otherwise healthy, normally functioning adults, they simultaneously experience complex fantasy lives. This has been sometimes referred to as having an "overactive imagination".

In reference to UFO experiences, medical sociologist Robert Bartholomew has written that there is a segment of the population who are "prone to experiencing exceptionally vivid and involved fantasies," and that, "such people often have difficulty distinguishing between fantasy and reality". Writing in The Conversation, science journalist Eric Smalley has hypothesized that "starseeds" may be experiencing the Barnum effect and that "several books published by big publishing houses may provide a sense of authenticity" to the belief of the "starseeds".

Robert Baker, a psychology professor at the University of Kentucky who was among the first to propose fantasy-prone personality as an explanation for UFO contacts, explained that — while such contacts were not likely based in real experiences — the individuals reporting them were "not psychotic, not crazy, not even neurotic. They're just a little different than the rest of us". Armando Simon, a staff psychologist at the Texas Department of Corrections, wrote in a 1984 issue of Skeptical Inquirer that belief "that UFOs are piloted by 'little green men' is the cultural norm in North America, and not ... a sign of mental illness."

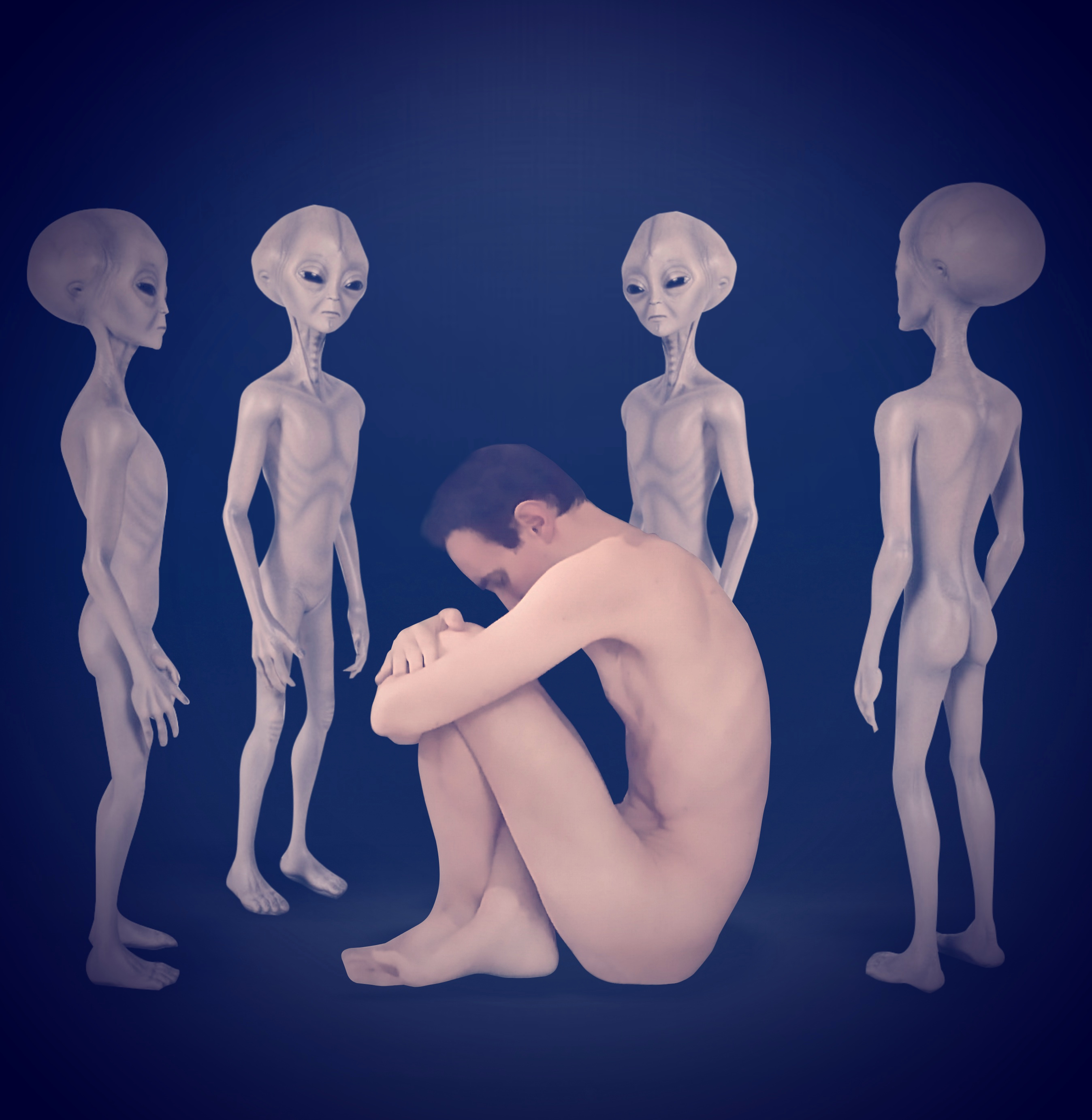
An illustration of an "alien abduction" of the type reported by some "experiencers"

A 1991 study of 152 individuals who reported alien abductions or "persistent contacts with UFO occupants", published in Professional Psychology: Research and Practice, found that 132 of them exhibited characteristics consistent with fantasy-prone personality.

A 2001 study published in the European Journal of UFO and Abduction Studies, summarized by neuroscientist Eric Haseltine, found that persons who reported seeing UFOs tended "to have a richer fantasy life than those who do not report UFOs". According to Haseltine, this conclusion did not indicate that such persons intentionally conjured stories of their encounters, but rather "that such individuals often had more vivid and frequent fantasies than the general population" which manifested in their belief in such encounters.

== Other studies and hypotheses ==
In a 1993 study published in the Journal of Abnormal Psychology, researchers compared persons alleging abduction by UFOs with persons who had more mundane UFO experiences, such as seeing lights in the sky, and found that the two groups did not differ on measures of psychopathology and fantasy proneness, concluding that UFO belief did not have a psychopathological origin.

Research published in 2017 by the journal Motivation and Emotion found that paranormal beliefs related to extraterrestrial life was partly motivated by the need for meaning in life and that persons who experienced a lack of life meaning demonstrated a higher propensity for such paranormal beliefs.

Harvard University psychiatrist John E. Mack suggested that some of the patients he examined related actual encounters with non-humans or non-human controlled UFOs that were not explainable as cases of mental illness or other differential experiences. A review committee convened by Harvard to examine Mack's work concluded he was not using "rational and scholarly" research methods. Mack's use of hypnosis to elicit purportedly repressed memories of abduction experiences has also been criticized. UCLA psychiatrist Fred Frankel, a critic of Mack's work, has noted that "hypnosis does not necessarily provide accurate recall ... in hypnosis fantasy and suggestion play a major role". Michael D. Yapko also criticized Mack's use of hypnosis, explaining that, during hypnosis, the hypnotized subject "can accept and respond to a suggested reality".

== See also ==
- Psychosocial UFO hypothesis
- Suggestibility
- Richard Sharpe Shaver
- Morris K. Jessup
- Paul Bennewitz
