= Michel Monnerie =

French UFO researcher

Michel Monnerie (born 1940) is a French UFO researcher regarded in some European circles as the pioneer of the psychosocial hypothesis (PSH). He authored two seminal works Et si les OVNIs n’existaient pas? (And What if UFOs don’t exist?)(1977) and Le naufrage des Extra-terrestres (The Shipwreck of the Extraterrestrials)(1979) Prior to this, he was a member of the editorial board of Lumières dans la Nuit, France’s most respected ufo magazine, but was fired after the second book was published.

== Research ==
One of the primary findings that prompted Monnerie’s advance of the PSH was that IFO reports seem to contain all the same narrative elements as unsolved reports, even purported physical interactions with the environment such as engine-stoppages and animal reactions. There was no firm way to predict how a case will break upon investigation by what was present in the report. There was a clear continuum between the trivial and extraordinary, an observation reinforced and amplified in Hilary Evans’s writings on entity phenomena.

Monnerie’s ideas include the suggestion that many high strangeness ufo experiences involve a waking dream, sometimes triggered by an external stimulus of the sort responsible for IFO reports that creatively works up and produces an experiential narrative involving projections of mental images and materials that the experiencer holds personally and/or culturally significant. The dreamer is influenced by the prevailing myths of his time, particularly those carrying the sanction of widespread social acceptance – an authorized myth. Universal psychological archetypes are also part of the psychological process shaping such experiences. Hilary Evans expressed doubts that archetypal processes shape most UFO sightings and experiences. It cannot have a dominant role in creating the UFO phenomenon as seen in UFO databases in part because it is the vast diversity of forms seen there that drives theorists to despair. This amounts to a quibble since Evans elsewhere pointed out that such diversity also plays havoc with the theory that UFOs involve real spacecraft piloted by real extraterrestrials visiting here from interstellar distances. It only requires a theoretical tweak that the dreaming process be only loosely constrained by such shaping processes within the dream producer and that drives for creative difference and individual predilections shaped by personal history are also part of the mix that eventually form the narrative of UFO encounter experiences.

== Publications ==
- Michel Monnerie, Et si les OVNIs n’existaient pas? Les Humanoides Associes, Paris 1977.
- Michel Monnerie, Le naufrage des Extra-terrestres, Nouvelles Editions rationalistes, Paris 1979.
- Michel Monnerie, “Classiques? Vous l’avez dit: Classiques!” in Thierry Pinvidic, OVNI: vers une Anthropologie d’un Mythe Contemporain, Editions Heimdal, 1993, pp. 69–82.
