= Flight 105 UFO sighting =

UFO sighting in 1947

Original saucer witness Kenneth Arnold (left) "comparing notes" with Flight 105's Captain Emil J. Smith (center) and co-pilot Ralph Stephens, in a photograph published on 8 July 1947, by newspapers across the United States.

The Flight 105 UFO sighting occurred on 4 July 1947, when three crew members aboard a United Airlines flight reported seeing multiple unidentified flying objects in the skies over the Pacific Northwest. The incident was among at least 800 similar sightings in the United States within a few weeks in the summer of 1947, but the first report by professional pilots. The U.S. military ultimately attributed what the crew members saw to "ordinary aircraft, balloons, birds, or pure illusion".

== Background ==
On 24 June 1947, private pilot Kenneth Arnold reported that, while in the air over southwest Washington State, he had seen a string of nine shiny objects flying past Mount Rainier at high speeds. The press coined the terms flying saucers and flying discs for the objects, based on Arnold's description. Arnold's was the first notable UFO sighting after the end of World War II, and was followed by a massive wave of similar reports over the next few weeks, ushering in the modern era of ufology.

== Sighting ==
Locations of Flight 105
Flight 105 departed Boise bound for Pendleton.

At 9:04 p.m. MST, United Airlines Flight 105, served by a Douglas DC-3, took off from Boise, Idaho, bound for Pendleton, Oregon. In a sign of the times, as the plane departed, the Boise tower jokingly suggested to "be on the lookout for 'flying saucers.'"

Eight minutes into the flight, as the airliner was flying "roughly into the sunset", First Officer Ralph Stevens saw what he thought were one or more approaching aircraft in the twilight sky. He responded by blinking the landing lights of the DC-3 and alerting his co-pilot, Captain E. J. Smith. The two men saw four or five objects, which they would later describe as "flat and circular". Smith would tell the Associated Press that they were "bigger than aircraft", but would say to United Press that because of the objects' positions relative to the airliner, "we can't say anything about their shape except that they were thin and were smooth on the botton [sic] and rough appearing on the top. We can't say for sure if they were saucer-like, oval or anything else about their size." One was larger than the others, and they were flying in a "loose formation". The objects disappeared, only to be replaced by four more.

The DC-3 followed the objects for 10 to 15 minutes, or about 45 miles (72 km). Smith and Stevens radioed the tower in Ontario, Oregon, as well as another United flight flying east in the area. Neither sighted the objects. They called flight attendant Marty Morrow, who was in the cabin of the airliner. She did corroborate what they had seen. The eight passengers did not see the objects, but Smith would attribute this to the objects' positions "mostly dead ahead of us and off the bow". Smith and Stevens were never able to catch up to the objects, which eventually either sped off or disintegrated.

== Aftermath ==
The following day, press outlets nationwide related Smith's and Stevens's accounts of what they had seen. Writing in 1948, one journalist recalled that:

… no report shook the incredulous so much as the account of Captain Emil J. Smith, veteran airline pilot, and his crew ... Here was substance, something that seemed above flimsy reports. The whole affair reeked of humor, but the story of Captain Smith and his crew, like a very few other reports, suggested a deeper, more authentic meaning running below the surface of the nation's belly laugh. These were reportedly competent men shaken by their own eyesight. There was a substantial evidence which grew in the atmosphere of mirth.

Smith, Stevens, and Arnold were photographed "comparing notes". The Idaho Statesman had its aviation editor and Arnold retrace Flight 105's route in a plane belonging to the newspaper. They saw nothing out of the ordinary. Arnold later said that he felt vindicated by Smith and Stevens's sighting, explaining, "Everybody can't be seeing things ... I might doubt myself, but can't doubt such observers as Capt. E. J. Smith". On 12 July, Arnold and Smith were interviewed by agents of the FBI. In late July, Arnold and Smith went to Seattle to investigate the Maury Island hoax, an alleged encounter with a UFO.

On 28 July, a "disklike object" was sighted on Flight 105 by a different pair of pilots.

== Explanation and legacy ==
Air Materiel Command ultimately concluded that "since the sighting occurred at sunset, when illusory effect[s] are most likely, the objects could have been ordinary aircraft, balloons, birds, or pure illusion." The Air Force would later point out the power of suggestion likely influenced observers during the craze.

Despite official explanations, the Flight 105 sighting was incorporated into UFO folklore and conspiracy theories.
