= Psychosocial UFO hypothesis =

Hypothesis in ufology

In ufology, the psychosocial hypothesis (PSH), argues that at least some UFO reports are best explained by psychological or social means. It is often contrasted with the better-known extraterrestrial hypothesis (ETH), and is particularly popular among UFO researchers in the United Kingdom, such as David Clarke, Hilary Evans, the editors of Magonia magazine, and many of the contributors to Fortean Times magazine. It has also been popular in France since the publication in 1977 of a book written by Michel Monnerie, Et si les ovnis n'existaient pas? (What if UFOs do not exist?).

UFOlogists claim that the psychosocial hypothesis is occasionally confused with aggressive anti-ETH debunking, but that there is an important difference in that the PSH researcher sees UFOs as an interesting subject that is worthy of serious study, even if it is approached in a skeptical (i.e. non-credulous) way.

The psychosocial hypothesis builds on the finding that most UFO reports have mundane explanations, such as celestial objects, airplane lights, balloons, and a host of other misperceived things seen in the sky which suggests the presence of an unusual emotional climate which distorts perceptions and the perceived significance and anomalousness of merely terrestrial stimuli. In the more exotic situation where people claim direct contact with extraterrestrials, the need for a psychosocial approach seems obligated by the presence of at least 70 claims of people meeting Venusians and at least 50 claims of meeting Martians; both worlds now known to be uninhabitable and devoid of any advanced civilization. Hoaxing seems to explain some of these contactees claims, but visionary dreams, hallucinations, and other mental processes are clearly implicated in such myth-based material. By generalization, the other material suggesting the presence of extraterrestrial entities from elsewhere is hypothesized to be explainable by similar means. The observed presence of surreal dream-like activity and imagery or themes based on the cultural environment and historically understood sources reinforces the proposition that the extraterrestrial hypothesis is unnecessary and, by Occam's razor, probably incorrect.

== Origin ==
In the English UFO literature, the term psycho-social hypothesis first achieved prominence in April 1984 when the cover of Magonia featured "The Rise of the Psycho-social hypothesis" by Jacques Scornaux and Peter Rogerson. Scornaux's use of the term traces back to French UFO controversies spawned by Michel Monnerie whose book Le Naufrage des Extra-terrestres (1979) presented "le modèle socio-psychologique" as a direct challenge to the extraterrestrial hypothesis. Claude Maugé had exposed Magonia readers to a brief outline of "the socio-psychological model" emerging from French studies in 1983, but flipping the syllables made the term more conventional to existing academic vocabulary. Rogerson's adoption of the term represented to him an evolution and de-escalation of exotic hypotheses he had been entertaining that originally included paranormal notions like psi, collective hallucinations, and the collective unconscious. The term marked the embrace of a fully normal system of psychological processes that included dreams, hallucinations, fantasy interpretations of materially real stimuli, distortions of perception, and metachoric experiences. These were things influenced by cultural myths, social conditioning, and historical context. Since 1968, the circle of writers who wrote for Magonia had been exploring alternatives to the ETH under a general sense that it had failed to account for much of what was being seen in the high strangeness cases. Roger Sandell spoke of being a nuts and bolts ufologist until he realized that the UFO reports he had gathered from a 1905 Welsh wave made little sense and were part of a larger complex of ghost stories and religious visions. He notes that ufological thought had once been dominated by theories that Venus and Mars were the source of UFOs, but the space program had shown they were in fact quite lifeless. Add in the apocalyptic and demonological material of then-contemporary UFO thinking, and the need for a major re-think seemed obliged. Could it all be mundane products of the human mind such as dreams, rumors and hoaxes? Peter Rogerson had similarly become convinced we are seeing the rise of a contemporary mythology and advocated for a comprehensive search for historical antecedents of UFO rumors. He began the search for the social factors driving UFO flaps and social panics. Magonia writers would point to "a relationship between UFO waves and times of radical social change" with Rogerson offering that the 1954 French flap had occurred at "a time of national defeat and government crisis." He offered a lengthy meditation on the social resonances and ideological influences shaping the varying beliefs found among UFO writers over the course of UFO history.

== Science fiction aspects of the UFO mythos ==
Bertrand Méheust, a French sociologist, began a study of the science fiction parallels to UFO mythology when he stumbled upon a copy of the novel The Lightning Wheel (1908) by Jean de la Hire in his family's attic. In the story, the central characters find themselves being lifted up by a ray into a flying disc that hums and glows with a halo of light. The discovery stimulated a search for parallels between UFO experience narratives and pre-1947 science fiction literature. Méheust found dozens of examples, many of the more impressive including such wondrous effects as invisible force-fields, mesmeric mental effects, materializations and dematerializations, teleportation, traveling through walls, levitating entities, and engine-stopping rays. One could also find humanoids visiting earth for a range of motives that parallel later UFO thought: wanting to spy on humans, experiment on us, breed with us, create a multi-generational program to shape humanity, deal with their dying world, invade our world, and teach us lessons about cosmic history and the need for peace. While some of this can be relegated to coincidences driven by similar reasoning and expectations about the future, often these wonders are more reminiscent of supernatural and old occult mythology than what is really reasonably expected to be created using future technology. Michel Monnerie wove Méheust's study into his larger historical critique of what shaped UFO mythology. Michel Meurger deserves special mention for expanding Méheust's thesis into an impressive compendium of parallels brimming with nearly 800 footnotes and a set of dozens of illustrations. One subsequent paper, in English, presents a focused historical study, showing a continuum between the nightmarish medical horrors experienced in modern UFO abduction narratives, back through the mad scientists of pulp science fiction, that built in turn upon anti-vivisection propaganda and rumors circulating in the 19th century.

Jacques Vallée was among the first ufologists to note that electromagnetic effects associated with UFOs could be found in earlier fiction such as a play written by Arthur Koestler and the first flying saucer novel – The Flying Saucer (1948) by Bernard Newman. This observation has been expanded in one study published in Magonia that traces a continuum of anti-machine machines back through wartime rumors about Marconi developing engine-stopping rays and a sizeable culture backdrop of films, film serials, and pulp stories imagining future wars and the superweapons that would fight them.

Méheust saw early on that the more common species of aliens in UFO experiences were well represented in the Hugo Gernsback era (1926–1936) pulps. This insight has been followed up in increasing detail by subsequent researchers. Grays, in particular, are now well understood as having been a stereotype in large part because Gernsback specifically asked his writers to do stories where future evolution caused beings to develop large brains but atrophied bodies caused by technology making muscles irrelevant to survival. Gernsback loved H.G. Wells's writings, reprinted his work, and it was Wells who first developed the logic of such degenerative evolution which he inserted into his masterwork War of the Worlds (1898). Important modifications to the stereotype were introduced by the creative team that built the aliens appearing at the climax of Spielberg's Close Encounters of the Third Kind (1977). Completely black eyes and thin pencil necks soon appeared on bald brainy aliens in UFO encounters in mimicry of film imagery. While the public was given the impression that the aliens would be based on those found in UFO investigations; the CE3K alien design team had never been given drawings to base their work on. They were only given a brief verbal directive that they should be large-headed and short.

Some work has also been done on the cultural back-stories to insectoids, reptoids, and some lesser horror clichés. Even precursors to alien fashions have been looked into in a light-spirited manner.

A number of other pieces in this tradition explore such science fictional saucer esoterica as doorway amnesia, miraculous ascension by lifting light, the physics of travelling through walls, magnetic propulsion, and aliens taking nutrition through the skin along psychosocial and historical lines.

== The saucer rumor ==
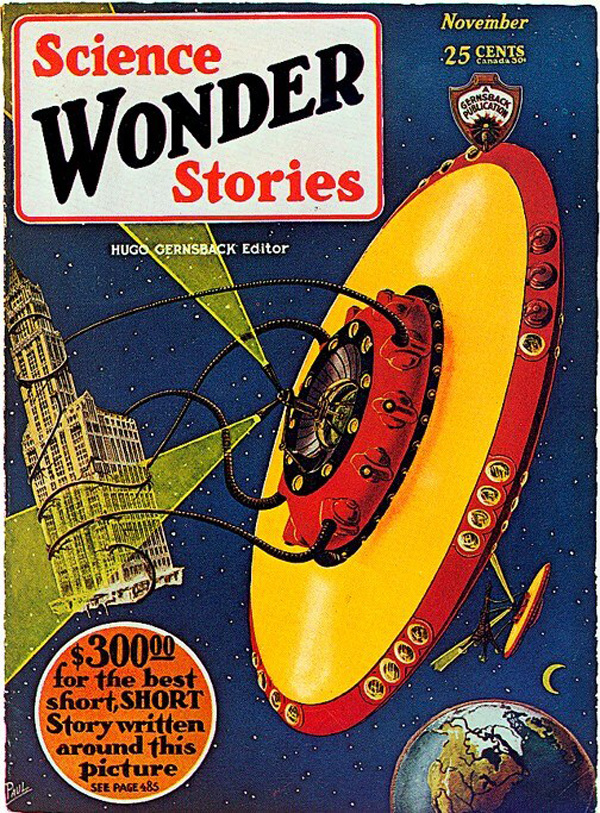
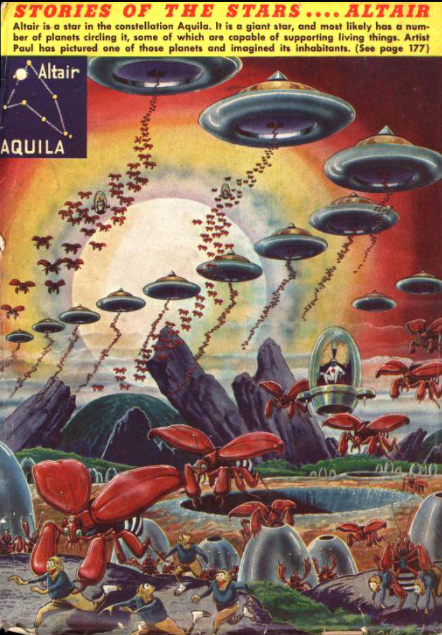
Disc-shaped spacecraft depicted in 1929 (left) and 1946 (right).

Arguably the most far-reaching and surprising mystery solved by psychosocial research was the puzzle posed by J. Allen Hynek in 1977: "Why flying saucers? Why not flying cubes or flying pyramids, or for that matter, why not flying pink elephants or even flying buildings, reported from a hundred different countries? Indeed if UFO reports were entirely the result of excited imaginations, why not hundreds, possibly thousands, of totally and radically different types of reports as people of different cultures let their locally conditioned imaginations loose?" In 1988, Martin Kottmeyer observed a colleague trying to speculate that the source of saucer imagery lay in a certain art movement. While the notion immediately struck him as wrong, he began to think about what might be a better approach. He soon began gathering together what writings he could find about the Kenneth Arnold UFO sighting in 1947, typically pointed to as the start of the modern UFO phenomenon. One of the first things he turned to was a memoir given as a speech before the First International UFO Congress in 1977. His eye soon fell on a statement by Arnold that the objects he sighted "were not circular". Arnold also complained the flying saucer label arose because of a "great deal of misunderstanding" on the part of the reporter who wrote the story up for the Associated Press. Bill Bequette asked him how the objects flew and Arnold answered that, "Well, they flew erratic, like a saucer if you skip it across the water." The intent of the metaphor was to describe the motion of the objects not their shape. Bill Bequette would later insist the fault was not with him, but Arnold himself but, ultimately it does not matter who is to blame for it. The only salient fact is that a mistake was definitely made somewhere. Any doubt about this is eliminated by turning to the first document written by Kenneth Arnold, the report he wrote and sent to Air Force mere days after his sighting nine mystery objects speeding across the face of Mount Rainier. It includes a drawing of the shapes made by one of the objects. It certainly confirms the memoir. It isn't circular or round as a saucer properly ought to be. Shoe heel or beetle might better express the awkwardly inelegant form.

The logical implications of saucers being a mistake had the feel of a paradigm shift to Kottmeyer, like suddenly learning that one of the axioms one learned in school forming the base of Euclidean geometric reasoning had just changed. One was not living in a Euclidean universe, but a Riemannian one where a straight line was no longer the shortest distance between two points. All those people in 1947 who reported seeing circular, disc-shaped, saucer-shaped crafts (82% of the 853 cases collected by Ted Bloecher) had based their expectations on a mistake, a rumor with journalistic credentials. They weren't seeing what Arnold saw, only what they were told he saw. Similarly the rumor shaped the UFO phenomenon for decades afterwards keeping the shape dominant throughout the culture, shaping film imagery, saucer photography, UFO illustration, contactee tales, and high strangeness abduction experiences. By one tally 82% of the craft descriptions in alien abduction reports fall into the flying saucer category. It can be found in nearly all the well-known cases: Betty and Barney Hill's interrupted journey, Herb Schirmer, Travis Walton, the Andreasson affair, Whitley Strieber.

Kottmeyer first reported his discovery in a letter to Saucer Smear published April 25, 1988. It was more widely disseminated when the finding was published as part of an article titled "Entirely Unpredisposed" that appeared first in Magonia in 1990. There he spelled out its full argumentative significance: "The implications of this journalistic error are staggering in the extreme. Not only does it unambiguously point to a cultural origin of the whole flying saucer phenomenon, it erects a first-order paradox into any attempt to interpret the phenomenon in extraterrestrial terms: Why would extraterrestrials redesign their craft to conform to Bequette's error?" In 1993, he offered a fuller account of the significance of the finding in a piece titled "The Saucer Error". Some ETH skeptics embraced Kottmeyer's arguments and tried to expand it with additional material concerning Arnold's writings. The cover of Arnold's 1950 memoir of the 1947 incident The Saucer As I Saw It has been pointed to as showing a more crescent-shaped craft than that drawn in the AF report. A photo of Arnold holding a sketch showing yet another subtly different shape has also been pointed to as significant. While not uninteresting flourishes to the story, one should not ignore that historical investigation always privileges the earliest documents of a case and those generated by the witness over later and second-hand journalistic quotes. Late images and writings are vulnerable to a range of doubts concerning both memory and distortions arising from revisions shaped by late arriving issues and fluid fashions of interpretation, reason enough to ignore them.

The principal counterargument advanced to save the ETH is that flying saucers were seen before Kenneth Arnold's story hit the headlines and those could not have been shaped by the rumor. Many of these reports were never published, let alone investigated, before Arnold became news and so are vulnerable to errors of memory and suggestion. Even if any are eventually found with a satisfactory pedigree, the argument overlooks that Hynek and Jacobs only offered the questions they did because saucers are the dominant shape of UFOs after 1947. No amount of research is ever going to change the fact that saucers make up only a trivial percentage of things seen in the sky before 1947 and will never be proven to be dominant. The fallacy of this approach is demonstrated by imagining what a Hynek-like thinker, immersed in the reports of the airship era (1896/7), asked and answered, "Why cigar-shaped and not globes or cubes?" and then was told that reports of a slow, low-flying cigar-shaped object in 1347 A.D. meant he had not found the source of the problem. He would clearly dismiss the report as irrelevant – the implicit issue is explaining the dominance of the shape. The rumor generated by Arnold's report is the clear answer to Hynek's question, regardless of minor cases that were exceptions to the dominants of their own era.

== Flaps of flying phantoms ==
In the first couple of decades of the saucer controversy, several researchers sought to argue that flaps were generated by saucers timing their arrival to the proximity of Mars. Predictions were generated, but notably failed. One 1962 study remarked, "If one works with data limited to the period 1950 to 1956 one can argue a correlation as strong as one in a thousand against chance existed." Outside this limited set, however, it is clear no correlation can be found. Charles H. Smiley, Chairman of the Department of Astronomy at Brown University computed 14 ideal minimum energy orbits for transportation from Mars to Earth and Venus to Earth between 1956 and 1965 and determined the likely arrival times plus and minus ten days. He then looked at the number of UFO reports to Blue Book for these periods. They were self-evidently insignificant and corresponded to no flaps. Other researchers argued flaps were indications of phased operations, indications of the construction of bases, or ways of desensitizing humanity to the extraterrestrial presence before overt Contact or a Mass Landing, which would culminate in the imminent future. These predictions clearly failed as well.

British researchers, puzzled by the failures decided to take things in new directions: Peter Rogerson would write, "There should be a major co-operative effort at a systematic search for pre-1947 'waves,' involving, if possible, full scrutiny of national and local newspapers, and scientific and popular magazines, starting with flap periods, then other periods." Attention should be paid to "the social, religious, political and scientific background." Roger Sandell's work on a 1905 outbreak of UFO sighting in Wales had already suggested that these earlier flaps had odd facets, some of the high strangeness material echoed modern cases, but not in the ways one might hope if one thought them extraterrestrial. Mary Jones encountered a sinister black clad man she identified as Satan, but would probably thought an MIB had it not been 1905 Wales. Other Men in Black were seen and one figure turned into a black dog before one witness's eyes. Noting such things only add to the complexity of the UFO phenomenon he urged progress could only be made by detailed research conducted with no preconceptions.

Nigel Watson, in time, began reporting on his research into a March–May 1909 panic involving the belief that German airships were spying on Britain. Phantom airship flaps would eventually be catalogued from a diverse set of places like New Zealand in 1909, Russia & Poland in 1892, Canada in 1896, Washington state in 1908, Denmark in 1908, South Africa in 1914, and Norway in 1914–1916. These flaps generally involved cigar-shaped craft more reminiscent of Zeppelins than extraterrestrial spacecraft and were attended by rumors of foreign spies and spy networks. They often had their own forms of physical evidences, multiple witnesses to crafts with improbable details, and surreal close encounters. The rumors all had idiosyncratic aspects which pointed to a need to interpret them in terms of the contemporary societal backdrop – often tensions about impending war, sometimes political conflicts within the society.

By the 1930s, the imagery of phantom airships was replaced by phantom aeroplanes – 'ghost fliers' in places including Scandinavia and Britain. Later phantom flier imagery transmutes into Foo-fighters and ghost rockets, in accordance with new rumors and newer facts of evolving modern technology.

One researcher would point out that a mid-1600s boom in prophecies accompanied rumors of the imminent overthrow of King and Church. The aligning of aerial phenomena and political events had been alleged as early as John Aubrey, the antiquary, concerning events in 1647. A series of sightings of second suns, second moons, and marching of armies in the sky, it was assumed significantly, preceded the 1662 Act of Uniformity and the revival of the Church of England.

In the spirit of being engaged in "a long, slow process of trial & error studies", variations in these explanations have been experimented with. The 1905 Wales flap occurred at a time that the traditional values were under assault from the modern world. The religious revival associated with the sightings maybe were generated by the tensions of rapid, unprecedented social change. Psychosocial researchers have looked into other notions like Phil Klass's notion that media is the primary driver of flaps but they find it so scandalously error-riddled, it is difficult to accept it has anything like the sizeable role he alleges. Media doubtless contributes imagery, but the emotional component of the rumors associated with flaps relies on larger aspects of the social environment.

Researchers in the psychosocial tradition generally do not accept explanations involving mass hysteria e.g. as when expressed back in 1954 by the French psychiatrist George Heuyer. By the time they were writing, doubts had already been expressed. Mark Rhine in the Condon report and Robert Hall for the 1969 AAAS symposium on UFOs looked at certain classic episodes of mass hysteria or hysterical contagion like the June bug epidemic, the Seattle windshield pitting epidemic, and the Mad Gasser of Mattoon, to see how well they could serve as explanatory models for what is going on with the UFO phenomenon. Neither developed the idea very far and Hall discerned several difficulties in comparing these phenomena, probably the most notable being the fleeting character of those model social epidemics. Michael Swords later offered additional observations that essentially killed it for researchers on both sides of the debate. In a recent discussion of Great Britain's Warminster flap of the 1960s, the researchers echo these developments and prefer to discuss the flap as a collective delusion maintained by rumor and gossip.

== The Modern Myth of Jung ==
With his essay Flying Saucers: A Modern Myth of Things Seen in the Skies (1958), Carl Gustav Jung can be seen as one of the founding fathers of the PSH. Some also say that because of his use of the concept of synchronicity in this book, he is also one of the founding fathers of paranormal explanations of the UFO phenomena. ETH advocates sometimes say that while Jung approached UFOs psychologically because he was a psychologist, he was also on record as stating that some might be true physical objects under intelligent control, citing in particular radar corroboration. They say Jung truly seriously considered the Extraterrestrial Hypothesis. The Associated Press quoted him in 1958 saying, "a purely psychological explanation is ruled out." The flying saucers were real and "show signs of intelligent guidance and quasi-human pilots. I can only say for certain that these things are not a mere rumor, something has been seen. ...If the extraterrestrial origin of these phenomena should be confirmed, this would prove the existence of an intelligent interplanetary relationship. ... That the construction of these machines proves a scientific technique immensely superior to ours cannot be disputed." Disciples of Jung have offered thoughtful rebuttals.

Jung complained about that 1958 newspaper piece for making him look like someone who believed UFOs were physically real. "This report is altogether false." Jung was completely uncommitted on the issue of whether they were real or unreal. He tried to set the record straight. "I was quoted as a saucer believer. I issued a statement to the United Press and gave a true version of my opinion, but this time the wire went dead: nobody, so far as I know, took any notice of it, except one German newspaper... one must draw the conclusion that news affirming the existence of UFOs is welcome, but that skepticism seems to be undesirable. To believe that UFOs are real suits the general opinion, whereas disbelief is to be discouraged... This remarkable fact in itself surely merits the psychologist's interest."

== See also ==
- Cultural tracking
- Extraterrestrial hypothesis
- Interdimensional hypothesis
- Demonic UFO hypothesis
- Cryptoterrestrial hypothesis
- Mystery airship
- Space animal hypothesis
- Time-traveler UFO hypothesis
- UFO belief and mental illness
