= Have We Visitors From Space? =

1952 magazine article

An illustration of a Green Fireball, created by the wife of meteor expert Lincoln LaPaz, was featured in the Life Magazine article.

"Have We Visitors From Space?" was an article on Flying Saucers by H. B. Darrach Jr. and Robert Emmett Ginna Jr. that appeared in the April 7, 1952 edition of Life magazine. The piece was strongly sympathetic to the hypothesis that UFOs might be the product of extraterrestrials. Publicity surrounding the piece is believed to have contributed to the 1952 UFO flap, a subsequent wave of reports that summer.

== Background ==
From 1947 to 1952, media and popular culture relayed stories of "flying discs", "flying saucers" and other unidentified flying objects. The reports began during the first summer of the Cold War, after the United States announced plans to re-industrialize Europe over the objections of the Soviet Union. That June, Kenneth Arnold reported witnessing multiple unusual objects in Washington state; his account was covered nationwide, triggering hundreds of copycat reports. In January 1948, press covered the death of a National Guard pilot who crashed while in pursuit of a UFO. That summer, press covered the story of two commercial airline pilots who reported seeing a glowing UFO over Alabama.

In the fall of 1949, True magazine ran a piece titled "The Flying Saucers are Real"; It reportedly became "one of the most widely read and widely discussed magazine articles in history." The following year, its author expanded the piece into a book of the same name. In September 1951, the film The Day the Earth Stood Still premiered with its tale of a man aboard a flying saucer who lands in the nation's capital in order to deliver a warning about atomic warfare.

Ginna spent over a year conducting research for the lengthy investigative piece. In the spring of 1951, Ginna began reaching out to the Air Force public affairs office. Edward J. Ruppelt and his superior S.H. Kirkwood first read the contents of the upcoming story when they attended a Civilian Saucer Investigators meeting in Los Angeles on April 1. Upon learning of the contents, Col. Kirkwood advised Ruppelt "We'd better get back to Daytona quick; you're going to be busy". On April 2, 1952, the Associated Press wire service ran a story about the upcoming piece which documented its title and most of its conclusions.

== Contents ==
The piece ran in the April 7, 1952 edition of Life, America's most popular magazine; Marilyn Monroe appeared on the cover. The article, which promoted the extraterrestrial hypothesis, specifically detailed ten UFO incidents which the authors deemed "most credible":

1. On August 25, 1951, a formation of lights over Lubbock was widely seen as well as photographed.
2. On July 10, 1947, a prominent astronomer later identified as Lincoln LaPaz was travelling from Clovis to Clines Corners with his family when they reportedly sighted an unidentified object in the sky.
3. At 10:00 AM on April 24, 1949, five balloon technicians working for Office of Naval Research engineer J. Gordon Vaeth were preparing to launch a Skyhook Balloon near Arrey, New Mexico. At 10:30, government balloon expert Charles B. Moore reported witnessing an unexplained white ellipsoid object through a theodolite. The other members of the crew corroborated the report.
4. In the summer of 1948, astronomer Clyde W. Tombaugh, discoverer of Pluto, reported a sighting.
5. In the fall of 1949, an unnamed Air Force officer charged with "command of the radar equipment that keeps watch over a certain atomic installation" reported an unusual radar return suggesting "five apparently metallic objects" which traversed the 300-mile radar scope in less than four minutes.
6. On May 29, 1951, three technical writers at North American Aviation's plant at Downey, outside Los Angeles reportedly witnessed glowing, meteor-like objects making right-angle turns in the sky.
7. On January 20, 1951, the Sioux City mystery plane incident featured a report of an unidentified cigar-shaped straight-winged aircraft.
8. On February 18, 1952, just before sun-up, photographer C.E. Redman was travelling to photograph a wedding. While stopped at a traffic light, he reportedly saw two objects over Tijeras Canyon. A second witness, W. S. Morris, also reported seeing an unusual object over Tijeras.
9. On January 29, 1952, two different American bomber crews in Korea reported unidentified lights over Wosan and Suchon.
10. On November 2, 1951, a "kelly-green" fireball was seen in the skies of Arizona by 165 observers. Green fireballs had been spotted in the region since December 1948. "Project Twinkle" had been established with three redundant sets of phototheodolites in an effort to obtain scientific data on the fireballs. The effort failed to capture the desired data.

The article quoted rocket scientist Walther Johannes Riedel, former research director of the rocket program at Peenemunde who by 1952 was a researcher for the United States, as saying "I am completely convinced that they have an out-of-world basis". Riedel argued the objects exhibited maneuvers that "only a pilot could perform but that no human pilot could stand." Physicist Maurice Anthony Biot concurred with this conclusion, saying "The least improbable explanation is that these things are artificial and controlled.... My opinion for some time has been that they have an extraterrestrial origin." The article concluded by rejecting claims that the UFO reports are caused by American or Russian technology, psychological phenomena, Skyhook balloons, or atmospheric distortions related to atomic activity.

== Reception and influence ==
Excerpts of the piece were featured in more than 350 newspapers. The Office of Public Information in the Pentagon released a statement saying "The article is factual, but Life's conclusions are their own." The April 28 issue of Life featured letters to the editor from a handful of readers offering to share similar stories. On August 1, the NBC network aired an episode of We The People, produced by the editors of Life, dedicated to flying saucers; Redman, Morris, Riedel, and Vinther were interviewed.

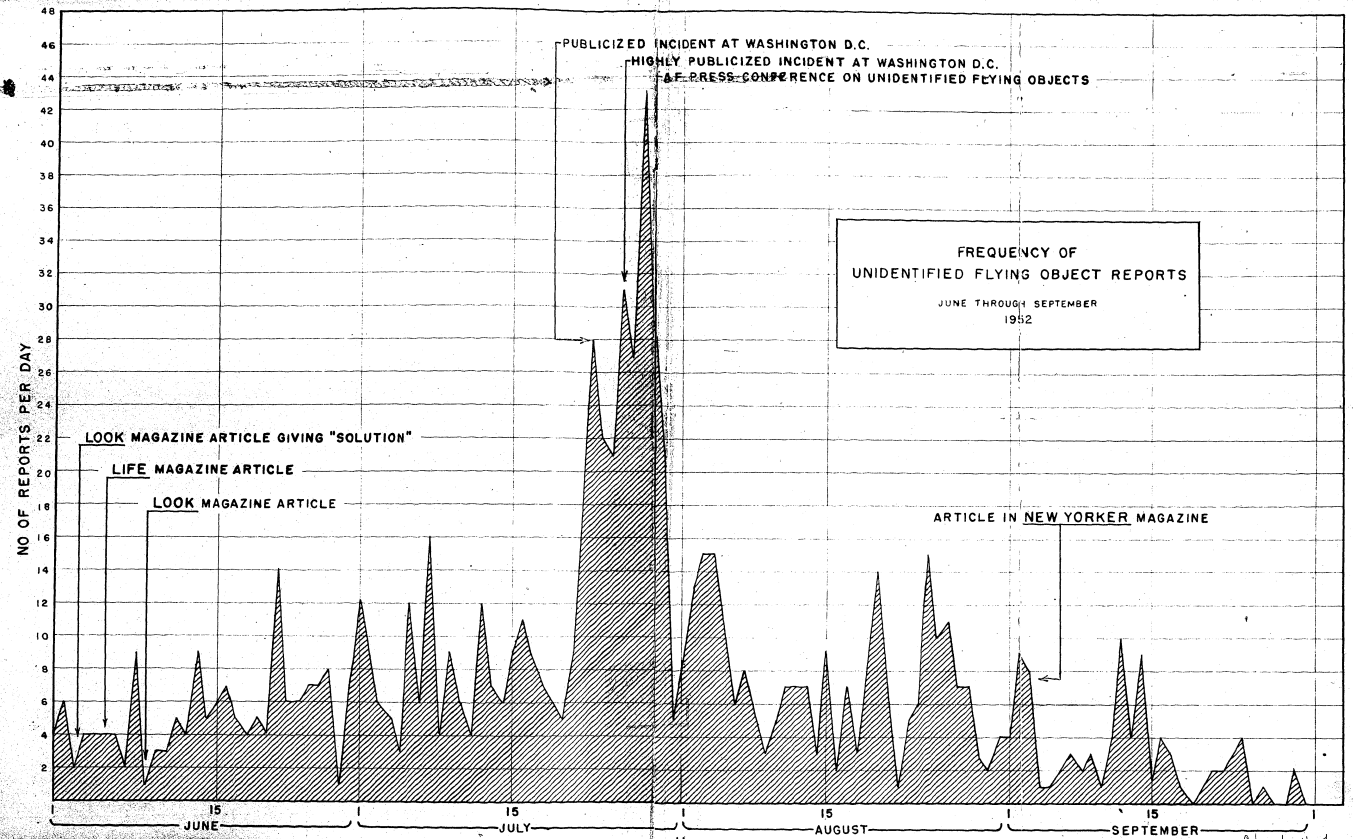
A US Air Force chart notes the article was followed by a wave of reports.

In the October 1952 edition of American Mercury, Victor Black reported that his sighting at "North American" was made up as a joke and argued that his fellow witnesses Ed J. Sullivan and Werner Eichler were seeking to profit off the hoax by creating the UFO group Civilian Saucer Intelligence. The other two men denied that it was a hoax. Los Alamos engineer Leon Davidson, who "became convinced everything about UFOs was a CIA plot", argued that the LIFE article had been part of a plot to convince the public of the existence of extraterrestrial visitors.

LIFE's claims were rebutted in The Report on Unidentified Flying Objects, a 1956 book by then-retired Air Force UFO investigator Edward J. Ruppelt, detailing his experience running Project Bluebook. That book reiterated that there is "no real proof" that flying saucers exist—no reliable photographs, no "hardware". In his 1963 book on UFOs, astronomer Donald Menzel detailed the many flaws in the article; He noted that in a span of ten sentences, the article contained at least six misstatements.

In 1991, a retrospective recalled when Life asked readers "Have we visitors from space?" Writing in 2010, author and UFO commentator James W. Moseley recalled the effect the piece had on him at a young age and noted he still had his copy of the piece. Jerome Clark remembered being influenced by the piece as a child. Author Ken Hollings observed that the piece's influence was magnified by its appearance in Life; Wrote Hollings: "What makes 'Have We Visitors from Space?' so dark and disturbing, however, is not the fact that Ginna has managed to find a few high-ranking Air Force officers in the Pentagon prepared to admit they think flying saucers come from outer space. It's that they are prepared to do so in the pages of Life magazine: a publication so established and safe that it recently featured a picture of President Truman wearing a Hawaiian shirt on its cover."
