= List of UFO organizations =

This is a list of notable UFO organizations located around the world.

== Belarus ==
- UfoCom

== Estonia ==
- AKRAK (inactive)

== France ==
- COMETA (Comité d'Études Approfondies)
- Groupe d'études et d'informations sur les phénomènes aérospatiaux non identifiés (GEIPAN)

== Sweden ==
- Archives for the Unexplained (AFU)

== Russia ==
- Kosmopoisk

== United Kingdom ==
- British UFO Research Association (BUFORA)

== United States ==
=== Active ===
- All-domain Anomaly Resolution Office (AARO)
- Center for the Study of Extraterrestrial Intelligence (CSETI)
- Center for UFO Studies (CUFOS or JAHCUFOS)
- International UFO Congress (IUFOC)
- Mutual UFO Network (MUFON)
- National UFO Reporting Center (NUFORC)
- The Sol Foundation
- To the Stars (TTS)

=== Inactive/defunct ===
- Advanced Aerospace Threat Identification Program (AATIP)
- Aerial Phenomena Research Organization (APRO)
- Citizens Against UFO Secrecy (CAUS)
- Civilian Saucer Investigation (CSI-LA)
- Civilian Saucer Intelligence (CSI-NY)
- Fund for UFO Research (FUFOR)
- National Institute for Discovery Science (NIDSci)
- National Investigations Committee On Aerial Phenomena (NICAP)
- UFO Investigators League (UFOIL)
- Unidentified Aerial Phenomena Task Force (UAPTF)

== See also ==
- List of investigations of UFOs by governments
- Identification studies of UFOs
- Ufology
