= UfoCom =

The UFOCOM or Belarusian UFOlogical COMmunity (previous and internal name: Ufological Committee of Belarus) is a non-commercial, non-government, non-registered public organization in Belarus. It was founded in 2001 in Horki, Belarus by a group of enthusiasts, mostly students of the Belarusian State Agricultural Academy studying paranormal phenomena in the local area. Later, the group developed into a statewide networked community of volunteers, performing both local and statewide field, monitoring and analytical research projects.

== Kosmopoisk relations ==
Since 2005 UfoCom has been a part of the Kosmopoisk international movement, officially serving as a non-registered office and public node for the all-CIS network of anomalistic/UFO research. All-Belarusian annual field meetings are held jointly by Kosmopoisk and UfoCom in places statewide that are considered the most notable and attractive from a researcher point of view. The coordinator of UfoCom also serves as the coordinator for the Belarusian regional branch of Kosmopoisk Unity (Kosmopoisk-Belarus). Since 2006, the UfoCom coordinator is Ilya Butov.

== Orthodox Church relations ==
In 2005, UfoCom was included on the list of destructive religious organizations of Belarus due to a series of unfriendly articles towards the church, published by UfoCom's previous leader, Ruslan Linnik. The problem was eventually solved with Linnik's withdrawal from UfoCom activities in 2006.

== Structure ==
UfoCom consists of a number of local groups in large cities in Belarus, most active in Minsk and Brest, as well as in Vitebsk, Horki and other areas, together with a number of individual members and corresponding members from Belarus and foreign countries. In addition there exists a special urban explorer team called Diggers of Brest, which performs research on underground locations such as Brest Fortress and abandoned ancient and Soviet-era fortification installations, and an archaeological team called Artefact. UfoCom focuses on studying various anomalous phenomena (UFOs, crop circles, poltergeists), meteorite impact sites, civilian, military and religious historical sites. Research is conducted in close cooperation with the National Academy of Sciences of Belarus and its facilities.

== Cooperation and partnership ==
=== Joint research activities ===
UfoCom widely participates and supports various networked (mostly Kosmopoisk-based) initiatives in Belarus:

Project	Activities and researches	Achieved result
Infra-S	Travelling infrared phenomena instrumental study, by means of networked observations with low-budget amateur photoelectronic devices	Unidentified sources (LIDAR beam-like) with about 0.4 Hz amplitude variation spotted in 2008
Tonnel	A field search and exploration of underground installations, possibly related to UFO phenomena, and their possible influence on processes in the environment	Several archaeological sites (non UFO-related) discovered and investigated
Dromos	A search and investigation of sites wherein UFOs are regularly reported, suspected of being UFO bases and potential nodes of a hypothetical transportation system	Several locations, supposed to be UFO-nests, have been identified in Belarus

=== Awards ===
Since 2005, a number of UfoCom members and implemented activities were nominated for the Kosmopoisk annual award. In 2007, two UfoCom volunteers were awarded diplomas from March for Parks, held by the Russian Biodiversity Conservation center's international environmental programme (the first time in post-USSR history members of ufological communities received awards for nature protection activities).

=== Media coverage ===
UfoCom collects and makes available for research a library of various literature devoted to anomalous phenomena, including rare items. For promoting research and their results, a periodical newspaper, Anatomy of Phenomena, is published on a non-commercial basis.

== Notable studies and expeditions ==
=== Field work ===
- Investigation and excavation of Stolbtsovsky meteorite impact site
- Discovery of a previously unknown Adolf Hitler command bunker in Belarus
- Study of Kupa archaeological site, which is supposed to be a 'Belarusian Stonehenge'
- Investigation of snow crop circle site

== See also ==
- List of UFO organizations
- Kosmopoisk
