= John Read Cronin =

American biochemist and organic geochemist (1936–2010)

John Read Cronin (August 3, 1936 – June 30, 2010) was an American biochemist and organic geochemist known for his research in the field of meteoritic organic chemistry. His work advanced the understanding of the role of extraterrestrial organic molecules in the origin of life.

== Early life ==
John Read Cronin was born on August 3, 1936, in Marietta, Ohio. He grew up in New Philadelphia, Ohio, where he developed an early interest in science and nature. Cronin's fascination with chemistry and the natural world led him to pursue a career in biochemistry.

== Education ==
Cronin attended The College of Wooster, where he obtained his undergraduate degree in chemistry. He then went on to earn a Ph.D. in biochemistry from the University of Colorado School of Medicine in Denver. His doctoral research laid the foundation for his later work in organic chemistry and prebiotic chemistry.

== Career ==
In 1966, Cronin joined the faculty at Arizona State University (ASU) as a professor of biochemistry. At ASU, he became involved in the emerging field of exobiology, focusing on the study of organic materials in extraterrestrial environments. His work at the ASU Center for Meteorite Studies, particularly with carbonaceous chondrite meteorites, positioned him as a leading figure in the field.

Cronin's research explored the organic chemistry of meteorites, with a specific focus on carbonaceous chondrites like the Murchison meteorite. His work provided insights into the diversity and complexity of extraterrestrial organic compounds and their potential role in the origin of life on Earth. John worked closely with Sandra Pizzarello with whom he collaborated extensively.

The meteorite center explained the significance of Cronin's findings and contributions. As the world consensus at the time was skeptical about the presence of amino acids in meteorites, John Cronin and his colleagues conducted independent tests using different analytical techniques to detect amino acids in various meteorites, including Murchison, Murray, and Allende. Their findings showed that:

- Murchison and Murray contained amino acids, while
- Allende did not, proving that contamination wasn't an issue.

This led Cronin and his team to further study the organics present in meteorites. They identified various compounds, including carboxylic acids, complex amino acids, and aliphatic hydrocarbons also using nuclear magnetic resonance.

The team also collaborated with Samuel Epstein from Caltech to examine the isotopic signatures of organic molecules in meteorites, which further supported their extraterrestrial origin. Cronin and Sandra Pizzarello discovered the asymmetry of organic molecules before they fell to Earth, which might have originated from the interstellar medium. This research is significant because the exclusively left-handed nature of life's molecules is essential for the structures and functions of terrestrial biopolymers and is assumed to be crucial for the emergence of life.

== Research contributions ==
=== Organic compounds in meteorites ===
Cronin's analysis of carbonaceous chondrite meteorites revealed a rich diversity of organic molecules, including amino acids, hydrocarbons, and nucleobases. His research demonstrated that these meteorites contain complex organic compounds that could have been significant in prebiotic chemistry.

=== Chirality and enantiomeric excess ===
Cronin's research on the chirality of meteoritic amino acids provided evidence of non-racemic mixtures, suggesting a potential extraterrestrial source of chiral asymmetry. This finding has implications for the development of homochirality in biological molecules on Earth.

=== Isotopic composition of organic molecules ===
Cronin conducted isotopic analyses of meteoritic organic compounds, revealing distinct isotopic compositions that supported their non-terrestrial origin. This work provided insights into the extraterrestrial sources of prebiotic molecules. They investigated and published significant work on the Murchison meteorite.

=== Impact chemistry and prebiotic synthesis ===
Cronin's research explored how meteorite impacts could synthesize organic compounds from simpler precursors, highlighting the potential role of impact-generated environments in prebiotic chemistry.
