= Young Cassidy =

1965 British film by Jack Cardiff

- 1965 theatrical poster
- Directed by: Jack Cardiff; John Ford (uncredited)
- Screenplay by: John Whiting
- Based on: Mirror in My House; 1956 novel by Seán O'Casey
- Produced by: Robert Emmett Ginna Jr. Robert D. Graff
- Starring: Rod Taylor; Julie Christie; Maggie Smith
- Cinematography: Edward Scaife
- Edited by: Anne V. Coates
- Music by: Sean O'Riada
- Production company: Sextant Films
- Distributed by: Metro-Goldwyn-Mayer
- Release date: 25 February 1965 (London)
- Running time: 110 minutes
- Country: United Kingdom
- Language: English
- Budget: $1 million (est.)

Young Cassidy is a 1965 British biography drama film directed by Jack Cardiff and starring Rod Taylor, Julie Christie, and Maggie Smith. It is a biographical drama based upon the life of the playwright Seán O'Casey.

== Plot ==
Starting in 1911 and the growing protest against British rule in Ireland, young John Cassidy (Seán O'Casey) is a labourer by day and a pamphleteer by night. When the pamphlets he has written incite riots, Cassidy realizes he can do more for his people with the pen than with the sword. He writes a new play, The Plough and the Stars, which he submits to the Abbey Theatre (which had already rejected another of his plays, The Shadow of a Gunman), and is surprised when W. B. Yeats, the founder of the Abbey, accepts and produces his new play. The opening of the play causes the audience to riot, and he loses many friends; but he is undeterred and is soon acclaimed as Ireland's outstanding young playwright.

== Cast ==
- Rod Taylor as John Cassidy
- Maggie Smith as Nora
- Julie Christie as Daisy Battles
- Michael Redgrave as W. B. Yeats
- Edith Evans as Augusta, Lady Gregory
- T. P. McKenna as Tom
- Jack MacGowran as Archie
- Siân Phillips as Ella
- Flora Robson as Mrs. Cassidy
- Pauline Delaney as Bessie Ballynoy

== Production ==
As early as 1907, performances of John Millington Synge's The Playboy of the Western World resulted in riots by theatergoers, which had to be quelled by police. The real W. B Yeats, a friend of both authors, said similar words at or after both riots. Young Cassidy brings this parallel history (the riots of The Plough and the Stars and The Playboy of the Western World) to vivid life, tied together by the character of Yeats.

Based on Seán O'Casey's autobiography Mirror in My House (the umbrella title under which the six autobiographies he published from 1939 to 1956 were republished, in two large volumes, in 1956), the movie began production in 1964, changing his name in the film to John Cassidy. O'Casey had read earlier drafts of the movie, and gave his approval to the script, as well as to the choice of lead actor, Rod Taylor.

Rod Taylor stepped in when the original choice for the role, Sean Connery, had to drop out because of scheduling conflicts with the James Bond movie Goldfinger. Prior to Connery, Richard Harris was attached.

The movie was initially directed by John Ford (who had already directed a movie version of The Plough and the Stars in 1936), but he fell ill about two weeks into production and was replaced by Jack Cardiff. Filming was held up for two weeks. Only one member of the cast was replaced – Sian Phillips came in for Siobhán McKenna. O'Casey died shortly before production on the film finished.

Anne Cotes the editor felt "the stuff that he [John Ford] shot was not great. And it was a bit unfair on Jack Cardiff, because it was not a very good film and it was to my mind totally miscast... It was Rod I mean he’s quite a good actor, but he just was miscast for the leading part."

== Sean O'Casey: The Spirit of Ireland ==
During the making of the film, a behind-the-scenes documentary, Sean O'Casey: The Spirit of Ireland, was filmed looking at the making of Young Cassidy. Narrated by Herschel Bernardi, the film intersperses footage from Young Cassidy with footage of the actors preparing for their roles.

== Reception ==
John Simon of The New Leader wrote that Young Cassidy is 'a well-meaning but fairly lackluster pseudo-or-screen biography' and 'There is one very effective scene of a street riot and its bloody suppression, but the Easter Rising falls flat'.

== Home media ==
Young Cassidy was released to DVD by Warner Home Video on 6 September 2012 via the Warner Archive DVD-on-demand system available through Amazon.

== See also ==
- List of British films of 1965
