= Walther Johannes Riedel =

German rocket engineer

Riedel in 1949

Walther Johannes Riedel (January 23, 1903 - November 16, 1974) was a rocket engineer who worked on the German V-2 and Wasserfall rockets before later working for North American Aviation.

== Career ==
In 1929, Riedel graduated from the Technische Hochschule in Berlin (now Technische Universität Berlin); From 1936 to 1946, he directed development of liquid-fueled rockets at Peenemünde. In 1942, Reidell was chief of design on the V-2.

During the US occupation of Germany, Riedel was arrested and jailed. German rocket scientists including Riedel were sent to the United States as part of Operation Paperclip. In 1946, he was profiled for cooperating with authorities at Fort Bliss, Texas. One article featured Riedel's complaints that American food was tasteless compared to that of his native Germany. On December 30, Albert Einstein and the American Federation of Scientists authored a letter in protest. Riedel was employed by North American Aviation which sought to recreate and improve upon the V-2.

In 1949, the United Press quoted Riedel's prediction of space ships in 25 years. He was against profiled in 1949 for his work at North American Aviation's plant in Downey, California. Letters to the editor featured a complaint about the piece's positive treatment of Riedel. I In 1952, Riedel was mentioned in Life Magazine's article "Have We Visitors From Space?", saying of UFOs: "I am completely convinced that they have an out-of-world basis". Riedel argued the objects exhibited maneuvers that "only a pilot could perform but that no human pilot could stand."

Riedel analyzed George Adamski's flying saucer photos and found them to be faked. The "landing struts" were General Electric light bulbs with logos printed on them. UFO researcher Joel Carpenter identified the body of Adamski's "flying saucer" as the lampshade from a 1930s pressure lantern. Riedel was a member of the Civilian Saucer Investigation of Los Angeles. In 1953, he was denounced by fellow NAA employee Victor Black, leading to an interview with the CIA.

He returned to West Germany and died in Hamburg in 1974.
