= Lincoln LaPaz =

American astronomer

- Born: February 12, 1897; Wichita, Kansas, U.S.
- Died: October 19, 1985 (aged 88); Albuquerque, New Mexico, U.S.
- Scientific career
- Fields: Astronomy, meteoritics

Lincoln LaPaz (February 12, 1897 – October 19, 1985) was an American astronomer from the University of New Mexico and a pioneer in the study of meteors.

== Early life and education ==
He was born in Wichita, Kansas on February 12, 1897 to Charles Melchior LaPaz and Emma Josephine (Strode). He earned his Bachelor of Arts in 1920 in mathematics at Fairmont College (presently Wichita State University) and also taught there between 1917 and 1920. He earned his master's degree via a scholarship at Harvard University, completed in 1922. On June 18, 1922, he married Leota Ray Butler and later had two children, Leota Jean and Mary Strode. Between 1922 and 1925 he taught at Dartmouth College.

He received his Ph.D. in 1928 at the University of Chicago, where he instructed for a short time and acted as National Research Fellow. In 1930, he was assistant professor at Ohio State University and became associate professor in 1936 and finally professor in 1942, where he helped develop the graduate mathematics program.

== Career ==
LaPaz took leave from Ohio State to the New Mexico Proving Ground during World War II where he was a Research Mathematician, and later as Technical Director, Operations Analysis Section, Second Air Force. This is where he became interested in ballistics as well as meteorites. His work with the Second Air Force included investigation of Japanese Fu-Go balloon bombs that had reached the United States.

In 1945, he worked at the University of New Mexico where he founded the Institute of Meteoritics, of which he was Director until 1966.

Between 1945 and 1953 LaPaz was Head of the Department of Mathematics and Astronomy. From 1953 to 1962, he served as Director of the Division of Astronomy at the university. In 1952, while serving as Director of the Institute of Meteoritics at the university, he researched the Lake Murray meteorite.

== UFO investigations ==
In ufology, LaPaz's name is often associated with UFO investigations on behalf of the military during the late 1940s and early 1950s. These include Roswell UFO incident of 1947, the N.M. green fireballs, that began in late 1948 and continued through the 1950s, and the search for near-Earth orbiting satellites in 1954 along with fellow N.M. astronomer Clyde Tombaugh. However, only LaPaz's association with the green fireball investigations for the Air Force is thoroughly documented and a historical fact.

=== Firsthand sightings ===
LaPaz had two known UFO sightings of his own. The first occurred with his family on July 10, 1947, only two days after the infamous Roswell UFO incident and only 70 miles north of Roswell near Fort Sumner, N.M. As reported in a LIFE magazine article on UFOs in 1952, though LaPaz was not identified at the time, "all four of us almost simultaneously became aware of a curious bright object almost motionless" among the clouds. "As seen projected against these dark clouds, the object gave the strongest impression of self-luminosity." It "showed a sharp and firm regular outline, namely one of a smooth elliptical character much harder and sharper than the edges of the cloudlets... The hue of the luminous object was somewhat less white than the light of Jupiter in a dark sky, not aluminum or silver-colored.... The object clearly exhibited a sort of wobbling motion ... This wobbling motion served to set off the object as a rigid, if not solid body." After remaining stationary for about 30 seconds, it then suddenly rose. "This remarkably sudden ascent thoroughly convinced me that we were dealing with an absolutely novel airborne device."

His second sighting was of a green fireball, soon after he began his investigations into the phenomenon for the Air Force in December, 1948. The sighting was on December 12 and the phenomenon was also seen over Los Alamos, enabling LaPaz to perform a triangulation. This showed the object's path was directly over the very sensitive Los Alamos. In a classified letter to the Air Force on December 20, LaPaz wrote that the object moved far too slowly to have been a meteor and left no "trail of sparks or dust cloud" as would be typical of meteors flying at low altitudes. Other anomalous characteristics were the intense lime-green color, low altitude of only 8–10 miles yet exhibiting no sound, flat rather than arced trajectory, and turning on and off like a light switch. Investigating many other green fireball sightings, LaPaz reached similar conclusions and decided they were probably artificial in origin, perhaps Russian spy devices. (see green fireballs for details) LaPaz's green fireball investigations were also mentioned in the 1952 LIFE magazine article, and his wife also made a painting of a green fireball.

=== UFO research ===
Regarding the 1947 Roswell incident, at least three witnesses, including two involved with Army and Air Force counterintelligence, claimed that LaPaz was brought in after the Roswell UFO incident to interview witnesses and reconstruct the trajectory of the crash object. However, UFO researcher Karl T. Pflock discovered some facts that might call into question some aspects of this testimony. For example, one of the purported witnesses to LaPaz's Roswell involvement claimed that LaPaz spoke fluent Spanish, but by interviewing family members, Pflock discovered that LaPaz did not speak any Spanish.

In August 1954, a story broke in the press that Tombaugh and LaPaz, working on behalf of the Army, had found two "natural" satellites only 400 and 600 miles out that had recently come into orbit. LaPaz at first vehemently denied that he was involved in any way, and later denied that anything had been found, as did Tombaugh (see Clyde Tombaugh for details). However, the fact that Tombaugh was indeed engaged in such a search was already public knowledge from previous press releases, as was LaPaz's knowledge of the search from discussions with Tombaugh, even if he was not directly involved.

In 1964 LaPaz was also involved peripherally in the investigation of the famous Socorro UFO incident, in which a Socorro policeman named Lonnie Zamora saw a small egg-shaped object land, saw two humanoid figures near the object, and then when he approached to within 50 feet, the object blasted off and rapidly disappeared. LaPaz interviewed Zamora and vouched for him as a witness.

LaPaz's true beliefs about the origins of UFOs are a bit muddled. Two witnesses have said that LaPaz told them he was of the opinion that the Roswell crash object was an unmanned extraterrestrial probe. The green fireballs he also felt were artificial in origin because of their anomalous characteristics. But government documents and public statements make it clear he thought they were probably Russian spy devices.

LaPaz's last known comments on UFOs and the green fireballs occurred in 1965 during a visit by astronomer J. Allen Hynek, a consultant to the Air Force's Project Blue Book UFO investigation. Hynek was also investigating the Socorro incident. According to Hynek, LaPaz felt the fireballs were the most important part of the UFO phenomenon. He remained convinced that the fireballs' anomalous characteristics had never been adequately explained by the official investigation. LaPaz continued to think the green fireballs were artificial, but now believed the fireballs, and also the Socorro craft, to be highly secret projects of the U.S. government. He also accused Hynek, Project Blue Book, and others of being part of "a grand cover-up for something the government does not want discussed".
