= Ted Bloecher =

American ufologist (1929–2024)

Ted Bloecher

Theodore Bloecher (August 22, 1929 – January 22, 2024) was an American ufologist, singer, actor, and author who performed on Broadway and toured with productions of Oliver!, Hello Dolly and My Fair Lady. Bloecher was a pioneering member of New York City gay culture, singing with the New York City Gay Men's Chorus from the 1980s.

== Early life ==
Theodore Bloecher was born in Summit, New Jersey, on August 22, 1929. Bloecher received a scholarship to study Fine Arts at Cooper Union and first began acting for the Provincetown Players. He attended Columbia University, majoring in dramatic literature, with a minor in music.

== Career in the arts ==
Bloecher started his career as a singer, and worked as an actor in theater from the late 1950s until 1973. In 1953, Bloecher was profiled for his upcoming role in a production of Street Scene. In 1957, Bloecher co-authored a musical titled "The Money Colored Rainbow". In 1959, Bloecher appeared in an opera titled The Clarkstown Witch based on the Nathaniel Hawthorne story Feathertop, with Bloecher taking the role of Feathertop. His performance was praised in reviews. In 1961, Bloecher appeared in productions of the musicals Tenderloin and Destry Rides Again. In 1963, Bloecher appeared in The Unsinkable Molly Brown and Irma La Douce. Bloecher appeared on Broadway and was part of the national touring company of the musicals Oliver!, My Fair Lady in the 1960s, and Hello, Dolly in 1972.

In 1985, he joined the New York City Gay Men's Chorus as a tenor and served as the group's librarian. In retirement, he served as a volunteer at the city's Museum of Modern Art. In 2019, Bloecher's memoir Coming of Age in Provincetown was published. In 2020, Bloecher's journals and art were exhibited as part of a retrospective on the role of queer people in New York's history; Bloecher, then aged 90, attended in person.

== Ufology ==
His interest in UFOs began in the summer of 1952, and he became known for his studies into early modern UFO cases. In 1954, he co-founded Civilian Saucer Intelligence and he served as an officer of the National Investigations Committee on Aerial Phenomena. In 1967, Bloecher published the results of a historical study that sought to exhaustively document all reported UFO sightings during the 1947 flying disc craze. The following year, Bloecher's report was adapted into a nationally syndicated comic strip by Supergirl-creator Otto Binder. Bloecher was a regular speaker on UFO topics, appearing at meetings in Britain, Arizona, and the 1978 MUFON symposium in Dayton, Ohio. Bloecher retired from ufology in the 1980s and donated his files.

== Death ==
Bloecher died in New York City on January 22, 2024, at the age of 94.
