= Sandra Pizzarello =

Italian biochemist (1933–2021)

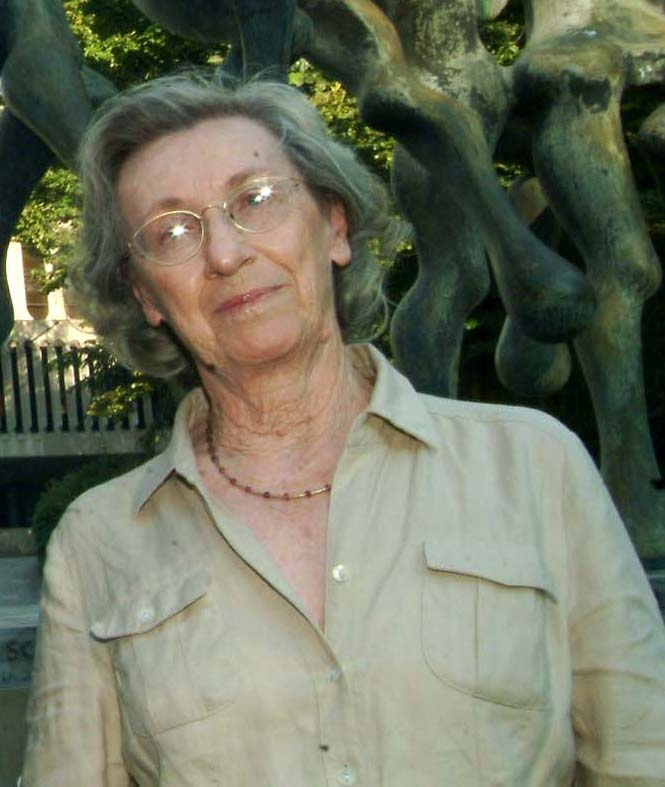
- Born: 24 April 1933; Venice, Italy
- Died: 24 October 2021 (aged 88)
- Education: University of Padua
- Occupation: Biochemist
- Employer: Arizona State University
- Website: webapp4.asu.edu/directory/person/274781

Sandra Pizzarello (24 April 1933 – 24 October 2021) was an Italian biochemist known for her co-discovery of amino acid enantiomeric excess in carbonaceous chondrite meteorites. Her research interests concerned the characterization of meteoritic organic compounds in elucidating the evolution of planetary homochirality. Pizzarello was a project collaborator and co-investigator for the NASA Astrobiology Institute (NAI), the president of the International Society for the Study of the Origin of Life (2014–2017), and an emerita professor at Arizona State University (ASU).

== Early life and education ==
Sandra Pizzarello was born in Venice, Italy on 24 April 1933. In 1955, she graduated summa cum laude from the University of Padua earning her Doctor of Biological Sciences degree under her adviser Professor Roncato. Pizzarello went on to work as a research associate developing tranquilizers for Farmitalia Research Laboratories in the Department of Neuropharmacology. Over the course of several years, Pizzarello transitioned from research to raising a family. Following a career opportunity for her husband, an aeronautical engineer and computer scientist, she moved her family to Phoenix, Arizona in 1970.

Once Pizzarello's youngest of four children finished primary school, her focus returned to her career after a decade away from scientific research. She audited a graduate biochemistry seminar course at ASU where she met Professor John Read Cronin, future co-discoverer of amino acid enantiomeric excess in meteorites. Due to her outstanding performance in the course, she was offered a job to work with Cronin at the university as a research professor in analyzing the recently recovered Murchison meteorite.

Sandra Pizzarello died on 24 October 2021, at the age of 88.

== Research ==
Sandra Pizzarello's research over the last forty years involved the analysis of organic compounds in several carbonaceous chondrites, particularly molecular, chiral, and isotopic characterization of amino acids. Because the formation of these organic-rich meteorites pre-date the origin of life, they had been under investigation as potential sites of primal organic compounds which could shed light on abiogenesis, specifically the origin of biological homochirality. Such studies, however, had been inconclusive until 1997 when Cronin and Pizzarello detected 7-9% L-enantiomeric excesses of three abiological amino acids while analyzing the Murchison meteorite.

Given Earth's history of meteoric impacts and the observation that meteors contain an excess of the biologically relevant L-stereoisomer of certain amino acids, Pizzarello studied the effect of meteoritic amino acids in enantiomeric excess on the formation of other biological molecules. In one study, Pizzarello found that nonracemic solutions of abiological isovaline and proteinogenic alanine can direct the condensation of glycolaldehyde to produce nonracemic solutions of threose and erythrose via an aldol reaction concluding that amino acids can act as asymmetric catalysts in carbohydrate synthesis. These findings support the origin of life hypothesis that homochirality originated prior to life and from extraterrestrial origins. However, Pizzarello's theoretical inquiries into cosmochemical evolution remain debated based on suspect analytical evidence of meteoritic enantiomeric excesses.
