= Robert Emmett Ginna Jr. =

American magazine reporter, editor and film producer (1925–2025)

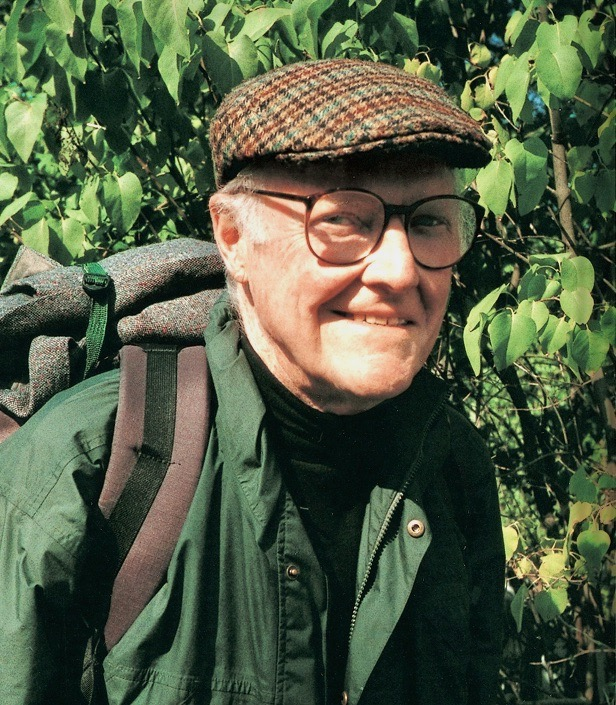
Robert Emmett Ginna

Robert Emmett Ginna Jr. (December 3, 1925 – March 4, 2025) was an American magazine reporter, editor, film producer, screenwriter and academic as a Harvard faculty member. He was a founding editor of People magazine, and later was Editor-in-Chief of Little Brown.

== Early life ==
Ginna was born to Robert Emmett Ginna, a Rochester Gas and Electric executive, and his wife, the former Margaret McCall, both descended from Irish immigrants. Ginna and his father were named for Robert Emmet, an Irish revolutionary who was executed by British authorities in 1803. After an admission to Harvard College, Ginna enlisted in the Navy at age 17, and was sent by the V-12 Program to the University of Rochester. He served in the Pacific during World War Two. He graduated from the University of Rochester in 1948, and went on to get a Master's in Art History from Harvard University.

== Career ==
In his early career, Ginna worked as a reporter and editor for Horizon, Life, and Scientific American. For his writing byline he dropped the "Jr." in his name. His article "Have We Visitors From Space?" appeared in the April 7, 1952 edition of Life magazine. In 1955, Ginna interviewed Sean O'Casey for NBC television. They became friends, and a decade later, Ginna would produce a feature film based on O'Casey's memoir. In 1960, Ginna interviewed filmmaker Stanley Kubrick for Horizon. Part of the interview was later published in Entertainment Weekly.

In February 1962, Ginna authored "Life in the Afternoon", an essay about meeting Ernest Hemingway in 1958 Cuba.

During the 1960s, Ginna was a screenwriter and film producer. Ginna worked with famous filmmaker John Ford on the film Young Cassidy, but Ford had to be replaced mid-shoot.

In 1974, Ginna was one of the founding editors of People magazine. From 1977 to 1980, Ginna was the Editor-in-Chief of Little Brown Publishing ; In that role, he was influential in writer James Salter's switch from screenplays to novels.

From 1988 to 2002, Ginna served on the faculty of Harvard University, teaching writing and filmmaking. In 2003, Ginna authored The Irish Way: A Walk Through Ireland's Past and Present. The book, illustrated with Ginna's own pen-and-ink sketches, was a record of his walk across the full length of Ireland, from North to South.

In 2006, Ginna was profiled for his role in creating an academic press at New England College. In the 2010s, he taught in the MFA Creative Writing program at Stony Brook Southampton.

== Personal life and death ==
Ginna's first marriage, to Patricia Ellis, ended in divorce. Later he married Margaret Williams, a colleague at Life; the pair had two children. She died in 2004. In 2017, their son, Peter Ginna, dedicated his book What Editors Do to his parents. After his wife's death, Robert Ginna was the companion of journalist Gail Sheehy, who died in 2020 at the age of 83. Robert Ginna died on March 4, 2025, at the age of 99.

== Selected works ==
- "Our Man from New York Observes Carol Reed Directing 'Our Man in Havana' " Horizon , Nov. 1959
- "Life in the afternoon : Ernest Hemingway, some quiet conversations regarding fishing, writing, war, bars, wine, hunting, and so on" (1962) Esquire Magazine
- FDR (1963) with Roger Butterfield and Robert D. Graff
- "Talking to Sean O’Casey on American Television" (1974)
- "In Search of 'The Treasure of the Sierra Madre'" (2002)
- The Irish Way: A Walk Through Ireland's Past and Present (2003)

== Filmography ==
=== Producer ===
- Brotherly Love (1970)
- Before Winter Comes (1969)
- Young Cassidy (1965)
- The Flood (1962)

=== Screenplays ===
- The Last Challenge (1967)
- World Wide '60 (1960)
