= Civilian Saucer Investigation =

Civilian Saucer Investigation (CSI-LA) was a short-lived Los Angeles-based group dedicated to the study of flying saucer and UFO reports from the early 1950s.

On May 29, 1951, three North American Aviation technical writers reported witnessing glowing, meteor-like objects making right-angle turns in the sky. The three men, Edward J. Sullivan, Werner Eicher, and Victor Black, joined with rocket scientist Walther Riedel to form the group. In March 1952, the group was featured in Time magazine, and in April, the organization was mentioned in Life magazine's article Have We Visitors From Space?. The group published the CSI Quarterly Bulletin, distributing four issues from 1952 to 1954.

In October 1952, American Mercury published Victor Black's article "The Flying Saucer Hoax". In it, Black claimed he and his friends had made up the sighting as a joke. CSI-LA dissolved, with its files being turned over to the National Investigations Committee On Aerial Phenomena.
