= British UFO Research Association =

British organization

British UFO Research Association (BUFORA)
- Founded: 1962
- Headquarters: United Kingdom
- Key people: John Wickham (Former Chairman on two occasions), has been the Press & Media Officer since 2019 but previously held this role in earlier years: contact him for TV & Radio interviews etc (Jenny Randles Director 1982–1994)
- Website: bufora.org.uk

The British UFO Research Association or BUFORA is a UK organisation, formerly registered as "BUFORA Ltd", dedicated to investigating UFO phenomena in the British Isles. In 1997, the organisation was reported to have around 1,000 members.

== History ==
In 1991, the book UFO Encyclopedia was compiled for the group by John Spencer, with a foreword by BUFORA president Major Sir Patrick Wall of the Royal Marines.

== Status ==
BUFORA investigates over 400 cases a year, with the organisation reporting 95% of them as hoaxes. They run witness support groups for those who believe they have encountered extraterrestrials. The organisation has held an annual conference at Sheffield Hallam University since 1987 and hold meetings across the country; with Rendlesham Forest being a frequent spot for gatherings. They have been outspoken critics of the UK government's Freedom of Information Act as it relates to UFOs.

== Controversy ==
An entry in the UFO Encyclopedia, which was a sighting confirmed as genuine by BUFORA, was later found to be a hoax. The supposed contactee, who claimed to have seen a UFO hovering over the town of Warminster, admitted to the hoax in 1994. In 1995, the group were the only official UFO organisation to endorse a film, purportedly by the US government, showing an alien autopsy at Roswell.

== See also ==
- List of UFO organizations
