= Before Winter Comes =

1969 film by J. Lee Thompson

- Theatrical release poster
- Directed by: J. Lee Thompson
- Written by: Andrew Sinclair
- Based on: story The Interpreter by Frederick L. Keefe
- Produced by: Robert Emmett Ginna Jr.
- Starring: David Niven; Topol; Anna Karina
- Cinematography: Gilbert Taylor
- Edited by: Willy Kemplen
- Music by: Ron Grainer
- Production company: Windward
- Distributed by: Columbia Pictures
- Release dates: January 1969 (London); 24 March 1969 (New York)
- Running time: 103 minutes
- Country: United Kingdom
- Language: English

Before Winter Comes is a 1969 British comedy-drama war film directed by J. Lee Thompson from a screenplay by Andrew Sinclair.

== Plot ==
Before Winter Comes takes place in the immediate aftermath of World War II. British Major Giles Burnside is assigned to a refugee camp in occupied Austria; his mission is to send the groups of displaced civilians to either the Russian zone or the American zone. Burnside is a by-the-book officer but he runs into trouble with the translation of the many different languages. However, one of the refugees, Janovic, can speak many languages and is willing to help. Janovic quickly conveys Burnside's orders and helps the camp run smoothly. Janovic runs into romance with a lovely innkeeper, Maria, until he discovers her affair with Burnside. Meanwhile, Janovic is found to be a Red Army deserter, who should be returned to the Soviet authorities to be executed. Burnside offers to help him escape, but Janovic cannot decide whether to trust him.

During a down moment Major Burnside tells a story to Pilkington about a brave Major who tried to defuse a bomb on a bridge by walking into enemy fire. He describes it as a chance to win a medal for bravery. As he finishes, the story switches to a general who reveals that Burnside was the major in question and his "brave" mistake led to the death of some 200 men and his posting to the camp.

Janovic makes a vain attempt at escaping to Switzerland but is captured by Americans and returned to Burnside. As Burnside organises his release to Linz and freedom, he is contacted by the British army who inform him that Janovic is to be sent to Freistadt (and his death) to prevent any conflict with the Russians. Burnside reluctantly sends Janovic to Freistadt but conceals it by labelling the truck as Linz. At the last moment, Lieutenant Pilkington arrives and threatens to stop the truck but is ordered not to intervene. Pilkington races after Janovic but is too late.

The film ends with Burnside being assigned to Indonesia and another camp, denied the chance to rejoin his unit. Pilkington visits Maria and breaks down angrily at Burnside. Burnside is commended by his sergeant for being a fine officer while the film ends with Janovic in a truck surrounded by Russian soldiers, his fate unknown.

== Cast ==
- David Niven as Major Burnside
- Topol as Janovic
- Anna Karina as Maria
- John Hurt as Lieutenant Pilkington
- Anthony Quayle as Brigadier Bewley
- Ori Levy as Captain Kamenev
- John Collin as Sergeant Woody
- Karel Stepanek as Count Kerassy
- Guy Deghy as Kovacs
- Mark Malicz as Komenski
- Gertan Klauber as Russian major
- Hana Maria Pravda as Beata
- George Innes as Bill
- Tony Selby as Ted
- Hugh Futcher as Joe
- Chris Sandford as Johnny
- Colin Spaull as Alf
- Larry Dann as Al
- Jeffry Wickham as Captain Roots
- Alysoun Austin as A.T.S. driver
- John Savident as British corporal

== Production ==
The film was based on a short story The Interpreter which had appeared in The New Yorker. Screenwriter Andrew Sinclair says David Niven insisted on a title change as he did not play the interpreter.

J. Lee Thompson said he made the film to return to more intimate dramas of earlier in his career such as Woman in a Dressing Gown.

Niven's fee was $250,000. It was an early screen role for Topol, who had become famous playing Fiddler on the Roof on stage in London. J. Lee Thompson called Topol "the Frank Sinatra of Israel, rugged, handsome, a Clark Gable type or a European version of Burt Lancaster."

Filming took place in Abtenau, south of Salzburg. John Hurt recalled "Niven was very helpful" during the shoot "because Chaim (Topol) was being difficult and tricksy."

In 2023, actor Larry Dann dedicated a chapter of his autobiography "Oh, What A Lovely Memoir" to share his memories of the making of this production.

== Release ==
The film opened at the Sutton Theatre in New York City on 24 March 1969 and grossed $17,846 in its first week.

== See also ==
- Hogan's Heroes
