= National UFO Reporting Center =

American organization

- Company type: Nonprofit corporation
- Founded: 1974
- Headquarters: Davenport, Washington, U.S.
- Key people: Peter B. Davenport, Director, Christian Stepien, CTO
- Website: nuforc.org

The National UFO Reporting Center (NUFORC) is a non-governmental, non-profit corporation registered in Washington State, the United States that documents UFO / UAP sightings and/or alleged alien contacts.

== History ==
NUFORC was founded in 1974 by Robert J. Gribble. It has catalogued almost 170,000 reported UFO sightings over its history, most of which were in the United States. In addition to record keeping, the center has provided statistics, graphs and maps to assist others looking for information. Slate Magazine published an interactive graph published by the current director, Peter Davenport, which showed the density of sightings relative to an area.

Davenport has not claimed that any two phenomena are identical, but has catalogued flying saucers, colored lights, and triangles, throughout the years. Davenport describes himself as a UFO believer, but skeptic, and has been praised by James Oberg as providing a valuable service in the field. The work has been described as 'secretarial' rather than 'fun', as the years have progressed.

Since its establishment in 1974, the center has provided a 24-hour hotline phone number for people to report UFO / UAP activity that is currently going on in their area. It also has an online form to submit written reports.

Peter Davenport, a businessman holding degrees from Stanford University and the University of Washington at Seattle, who became involved soon after hearing about the Kelly–Hopkinsville encounter, has served as director of the organization since 1994. Christian Stepien, a tech entrepreneur, has served as CTO over the same period.

The organization has been used by the Stamford police department in prior years, though events have always had a perfectly reasonable explanation.

Police officers from Lebanon, Missouri, as well as various Arizona law enforcement officials, frequently refer UFO sightings to the organization, with no explanations forthcoming for some instances. Arizona relied on the organization specifically, in response to the Phoenix Lights incident, which was one of the sightings Davenport has been on record as proclaiming to be genuine.

Except for donations, the organization has been almost entirely funded by Davenport and Stepien themselves, which was estimated to cost $500–5,000 a month.

Until 2006, the center was based in Seattle, Washington, but that year it relocated to a bunker in a former nuclear missile site about 50 miles west of Spokane, Washington.

== Public reporting ==
MUFON, the most prominent UFO data collectors in the US, have worked with the National UFO Reporting Center, to publicise trends in public sightings reporting.

The National UFO Reporting Center has been discussed on the radio show Coast To Coast AM and on Jeff Rense's radio show.

== See also ==
- List of UFO organizations
