= People (magazine) =

American weekly magazine

- Issue cover dated June 20, 2016, after the death of Muhammad Ali
- Editor: Charlotte Triggs
- Categories: Celebrity; Human interest Royals; Crime; Fashion & Lifestyle
- Total circulation: 3,425,166 (2018)
- First issue: March 4, 1974; 52 years ago
- Company: People Inc.
- Country: United States
- Language: English
- Website: people.com
- ISSN: 0093-7673
- OCLC: 794712888

People is an American weekly magazine that specializes in celebrity news and human-interest stories. It is published by People Inc., a subsidiary of People Incorporated.

As of 2025, People has approximately 2.2 million paid subscribers across print and digital editions, making it one of the largest magazine audiences in the United States.

People's website, People.com, focuses on celebrity and crime news, royal updates, fashion and lifestyle recommendations and human interest stories. In 2025, the website attracted approximately 187 million monthly visits across desktop and mobile platforms.

People produces yearly special issues naming the "World's Most Beautiful", "Best & Worst Dressed", and "Sexiest Man Alive". The magazine's headquarters are in New York City, and it maintains editorial bureaus in Los Angeles and in London.

== History ==
Evolution of People Inc.
- 1922: Time Inc., the predecessor to the modern People Inc., was founded by Henry Luce and Briton Hadden, and it became the biggest magazine owner
- 1927: Time (Magazine), the namesake publication of Time Inc., began its annual Time Person of the Year
- 1930: Fortune was launched as Time's second magazine imprint to cover business journalism and economics
- 1936: Life, named after the older humor magazine, began publishing and popularized photojournalism
- 1941: In a famous editorial dubbed the American Century, Henry Luce envisioned U.S. foreign policy becoming more interventionist
- 1950s: Sports Illustrated launched as Time's dedicated sports magazine with a focus on vivid photography
- 1961: Time-Life was established as Time's marketing division, and it grew into a minor multimedia company
- 1968: Little, Brown and Company was acquired and incorporated into Time as its book publishing division
- 1972: Time acquired Home Box Office, Inc. from Charles Dolan and began managing the HBO pay-tv network
- 1974: People was launched to serve as the spiritual successor to Life, with a focus on celebrities and popular culture
- 1985: Southern Progress Corporation was acquired, and Time gained notable imprints like Southern Living and launched titles like Cooking Light
- 1989: Time Inc. became a subsidiary under Time Warner after merging with Warner Communications, and its book assets were soon consolidated
- 1992: Time Warner Cable was established as the consolidated cable division of Time Warner, and until 2016, it was the second-largest cable operator
- 1997: AskJeeves launched online and became a major search engine; after the dot-com bubble, it declined and was bought out by IAC
- 1999: Pathfinder, a digital hub for Time imprints, was shut down due to unprofitability, and Time Warner later pursued a merger with AOL
- 2006: The Lagardère Group acquired the Time Warner Book Group and renamed it Hachette Book Group
- 2014: Time Inc. was spun off as a separate, public company from Time Warner due to the decline of print media
- 2018: After being acquired by Meredith, Time Inc. was dissolved, and non-core magazine titles were placed for sale
- 2021: Dotdash merged with Meredith, and the merged company became a subsidiary of IAC as Dotdash Meredith
- 2025: Dotdash Meredith rebranded as People Inc., adopting the name of its flagship magazine.

Andrew Heiskell, who was the chief executive officer of Time Inc. at the time and the former publisher of the weekly Life magazine, is credited with coming up with the idea for People Weekly. The founding managing editor was Richard Stolley, a former assistant managing editor at Life and the journalist who acquired the Zapruder film of the John F. Kennedy assassination for Time Inc. in 1963. The first publisher was Richard J. "Dick" Durrell, another Time Inc. veteran.

Stolley characterized the magazine as "getting back to the people who are causing the news and who are caught up in it, or deserve to be in it. Our focus is on people, not issues." Stolley's almost religious determination to keep the magazine people-focused contributed significantly to its rapid early success. It is said that although Time Inc. pumped an estimated $40 million into the venture, the magazine only broke even 18 months after its debut on February 25, 1974. Initially, the magazine was sold primarily on newsstands and in supermarkets. To get the magazine out each week, founding staff members regularly slept on the floor of their offices two or three nights each week and severely limited all non-essential outside engagements. The premiere edition for the week ending March 4, 1974, featured actress Mia Farrow, then starring in the film The Great Gatsby, on the cover. That issue also featured stories on Gloria Vanderbilt, Aleksandr Solzhenitsyn and the wives of U.S. Vietnam veterans who were missing in action. The magazine was, apart from its cover, printed in black-and-white. The initial cover price was 35 cents (equivalent to $2.28 in 2025).

The core of the small founding editorial team included other editors, writers, photographers and photo editors from Life magazine, which had ceased publication just 13 months earlier. This group included managing editor Stolley, senior editors Hal Wingo (father of ESPN anchor Trey Wingo), Sam Angeloff (the founding managing editor of Us magazine) and Robert Emmett Ginna Jr. (a former Life writer and also a film and television producer); writers James Watters (a theater reviewer) and Ronald B. Scott (later a biographer of presidential candidate Mitt Romney); former Time senior editor Richard Burgheim (later the founder of Time's ill-fated cable television magazine View); Chief of Photography, a Life photographer, John Loengard, to be succeeded by John Dominus, a noteworthy Life staff photographer; and design artist Bernard Waber, author, and illustrator of the Lyle The Crocodile book series for children. Many of the noteworthy Life photographers contributed to the magazine as well, including legends Alfred Eisenstaedt and Gjon Mili and rising stars Co Rentmeester, David Burnett and Bill Eppridge. Other members of the first editorial staff included editors and writers Ross Drake, Ralph Novak, Bina Bernard, James Jerome, Sally Moore, Mary Vespa, Lee Wohlfert, Joyce Wansley, Curt Davis, Clare Crawford-Mason, and Jed Horne, later an editor of The Times-Picayune in New Orleans.

In 1996, Time Inc. launched a Spanish-language magazine entitled People en Español. The company has said that the new publication emerged after a 1995 issue of the original magazine was distributed with two distinct covers, one featuring the murdered Tejano singer Selena and the other featuring the hit television series Friends; the Selena cover sold out while the other did not. Although the original idea was that Spanish-language translations of articles from the English magazine would comprise half the content, People en Español over time came to have entirely original content.

The April 22, 2002, issue was the first to omit "Weekly" from the magazine's cover. That year, People launched People StyleWatch, a magazine devoted to celebrity style, fashion, and beauty, expanding on its StyleWatch column. Due to its success, the frequency of People Stylewatch was increased to 10 times per year in 2007. In spring 2017, People Stylewatch was rebranded as PeopleStyle. In late 2017, it was announced that there would no longer be a print version of PeopleStyle and it would be a digital-only publication.

In October 2005, it was named "Magazine of the Year" by Ad Age for excellence in editorial, circulation, and advertising.

In October 2006, People ranked number 6 on Advertising Age's annual "A-list" and number 3 on Adweek's "Brand Blazers" list.

In 2006, it had a circulation of 3.75 million.

In 2006, for financial reasons, it closed bureaus in Austin, Miami, and Chicago.

With a readership of 46.6 million adults in 2009, People had the largest audience of any American magazine.

In Australia, the localized version of People is titled Who since there was already another magazine published under the title People. The international edition of People has been published in Greece since 2010.

People had $997 million in advertising revenue in 2011, the highest advertising revenue of any American magazine.

In July 2013, Outlook Group announced that it was closing down the Indian edition of People, which began publication in 2008.

In September 2016, in collaboration with Entertainment Weekly, People launched the People/Entertainment Weekly Network. The "free, ad-supported online-video network ... covering celebrities, pop culture, lifestyle and human-interest stories", was rebranded as PeopleTV in September 2017.

In December 2016, LaTavia Roberson engaged in a feud with People after alleging they misquoted and misrepresented her interview online.

Meredith purchased Time Inc., including People, in 2017. In 2019, People editor Jess Cagle announced he was stepping down from his role. It was later announced he would be replaced by deputy editor Dan Wakeford, who previously worked for In Touch Weekly. Liz Vaccariello was named the new Editor in Chief on February 23, 2022, replacing Dan Wakeford.

People fell to second place in 2018 after its readership declined to 35.9 million.

In October 2021, Dotdash agreed to purchase Meredith, which still owned People and sister magazines such as Entertainment Weekly, InStyle, and Chip and Joanna Gaines' Magnolia Journal, in a $2.7 billion deal. The purchase would be finalized on December 1, 2021.

In April 2025, People launched a standalone mobile application featuring a vertical, scrollable feed of celebrity news, videos, and lifestyle content aimed at younger audiences.

The publisher, previously Dotdash Meredith, adopted the name People Inc. in 2025, reflecting the central role of the People brand within the company's media portfolio.

=== Teen People ===
Teen People
- Managing Editor: Niraj Biswal; Barbara O'Dair
- Categories: Celebrity
- Frequency: Monthly
- First issue: February 1998
- Final issue: September 2006
- Company: Time Inc. (Time Warner)
- Country: United States
- Language: English
- ISSN: 1096-2832

In 1998, the magazine introduced a version targeted at teens, called Teen People. However, on July 27, 2006, the company announced that it would shut down publication of Teen People immediately. The last issue to be released was scheduled for September 2006. In exchange, subscribers to this magazine received Entertainment Weekly for the rest of their subscriptions. There were numerous reasons cited for the publication shutdown, including a downfall in ad pages, competition from both other teen-oriented magazines and the internet, and a decrease in circulation numbers. Teenpeople.com was merged into People.com in April 2007. People.com will "carry teen-focused stories that are branded as TeenPeople.com", Mark Golin, the editor of People.com explained. On the decision to merge the brands, he stated, "We've got traffic on TeenPeople, People is a larger site, why not combine and have the teen traffic going to one place?"

=== Competition for celebrity photos ===
In a July 2006 Variety article, Janice Min, Us Weekly editor-in-chief, blamed People for the increase in cost to publishers of celebrity photos:

They are among the largest spenders of celebrity photos in the industry.... One of the first things they ever did, that led to the jacking up of photo prices, was to pay $75,000 to buy pictures of Jennifer Lopez reading Us magazine, so Us Weekly couldn't buy them. That was the watershed moment that kicked off high photo prices in my mind. I had never seen anything like it. But they saw a competitor come along, and responded. It was a business move, and probably a smart one.

People reportedly paid $4.1 million for photos of newborn Shiloh Nouvel Jolie-Pitt, the child of Angelina Jolie and Brad Pitt. The photos set a single-day traffic record for their website, attracting 26.5 million page views.

=== Sexiest Man Alive ===
The annual feature the "Sexiest Man Alive" is billed as a benchmark of male attractiveness and typically includes only famous people. It is determined using a procedure similar to the procedure used for Time's Person of the Year. The origin of the title was a discussion on a planned story on Mel Gibson. Someone exclaimed, "Oh my God, he is the sexiest man alive!" And someone else said, "You should use that as a cover line."

For the first decade or so, the feature appeared at uneven intervals. Originally awarded in the wintertime, it shifted around the calendar, resulting in gaps as short as seven months and as long as a year and a half, with no selection at all during 1994 (21 years later the magazine did select Keanu Reeves to fill the 1994 gap, with runners-up including Hugh Grant and Jim Carrey). Since 1997, the dates have settled between mid-November and early December. Denzel Washington was the first racialized winner, and Jonathan Bailey was the first openly LGBTQ+ winner.

Dates of magazine issues, winners, ages of winners at the time of selection, and pertinent comments are listed below.

As of 2025, former winners John F. Kennedy Jr., Sean Connery, and Patrick Swayze have since died. Kennedy and David Beckham are the only non-entertainers to have won the accolade.

As of 2026, former winners Richard Gere, Brad Pitt, George Clooney, and Johnny Depp are the only people to have won the accolade twice.

Year	Choice	Age
February 4, 1985	Mel Gibson	29
January 27, 1986	Mark Harmon	34
March 30, 1987	Harry Hamlin	35
September 12, 1988	John F. Kennedy Jr.	28
December 16, 1989	Sean Connery	59
July 23, 1990	Tom Cruise	27
July 22, 1991	Patrick Swayze	38
March 16, 1992	Nick Nolte	51
October 19, 1993	Richard Gere (1) (Sexiest Couple Alive)	44
October 19, 1993	Cindy Crawford	27
1994 (awarded on November 18, 2015)	Keanu Reeves	30
January 30, 1995	Brad Pitt (1)	32
July 29, 1996	Denzel Washington	41
November 17, 1997	George Clooney (1)	36
November 16, 1998	Harrison Ford	56
November 15, 1999	Richard Gere (2)	50
November 13, 2000	Brad Pitt (2)	37
November 26, 2001	Pierce Brosnan	48
December 2, 2002	Ben Affleck	30
December 1, 2003	Johnny Depp (1)	40
November 29, 2004	Jude Law	31
November 28, 2005	Matthew McConaughey	36
November 27, 2006	George Clooney (2)	45
November 26, 2007	Matt Damon	37
November 25, 2008	Hugh Jackman	40
November 18, 2009	Johnny Depp (2)	46
November 17, 2010	Ryan Reynolds	34
November 16, 2011	Bradley Cooper	36
November 14, 2012	Channing Tatum	32
November 19, 2013	Adam Levine	34
November 19, 2014	Chris Hemsworth	31
November 17, 2015	David Beckham	40
November 15, 2016	Dwayne Johnson	44
November 14, 2017	Blake Shelton	41
November 5, 2018	Idris Elba	46
November 13, 2019	John Legend	40
November 30, 2020	Michael B. Jordan	33
November 10, 2021	Paul Rudd	52
November 7, 2022	Chris Evans	41
November 7, 2023	Patrick Dempsey	57
November 13, 2024	John Krasinski	45
November 3, 2025	Jonathan Bailey	37
November 9, 2026	Noah Wyle	55

==== Centerfold ====
The magazine released its first Sexiest Man Alive centerfold issue in 2025, with singer Role Model being chosen.

Year	Choice	Age
November 5, 2025	Role Model	28

=== Sexiest Woman Alive ===
In December 2014, People selected its first and only Sexiest Woman Alive, Kate Upton. Cindy Crawford and Richard Gere were declared "Sexiest Couple of the Year" on October 19, 1993.

Year	Choice	Age
December 25, 2014	Kate Upton	22

=== Cutest Baby Alive ===
In 2019, People selected its first Cutest Baby Alive, Andy Cohen's son Benjamin. In 2020, Anderson Cooper's son, Wyatt Morgan, was named the Cutest Baby Alive.

Year	Choice
November 13, 2019	Benjamin Cohen
November 19, 2020	Wyatt Morgan

=== Most Intriguing People of the Year ===
At the end of each year People magazine famously selects 25 news-making individuals or couples who have received much media attention over the past 12 months and showcases them in a special year-end issue, the '25 Most Intriguing People of the Year'. This series of full-page features and half-page featurettes includes world leaders and political activists, famous actors and entertainers, elite athletes, prominent business people, accomplished scientists and occasionally members of the public whose stories have made an unusual impact in news or tabloid media.

=== 100 Most Beautiful People ===
People's 100 Most Beautiful People is an annual list of 100 people judged to be the most beautiful individuals in the world. Until 2006, it was the 50 Most Beautiful People.

Julia Roberts holds the record for most times named, with five. Michelle Pfeiffer, Jennifer Aniston, and Kate Hudson have appeared twice.

In 2020, Goldie Hawn, Kate Hudson, and Hudson's daughter Rani became the first multigenerational cover stars of the Beautiful Issue. In addition, Hawn and her granddaughter concurrently became the oldest and youngest to cover the Beautiful Issue.

100 Most Beautiful People cover stars
Issue date	Name	Age
June 1, 1990	Michelle Pfeiffer (1)	32
June 7, 1991	Julia Roberts (1)	23
May 4, 1992	Jodie Foster	28
May 3, 1993	Cindy Crawford	27
May 8, 1994	Meg Ryan	32
May 8, 1995	Courteney Cox	30
May 8, 1996	Mel Gibson	40
May 12, 1997	Tom Cruise	34
May 12, 1998	Leonardo DiCaprio	24
May 14, 1999	Michelle Pfeiffer (2)	41
May 8, 2000	Julia Roberts (2)	32
May 14, 2001	Catherine Zeta-Jones	31
May 13, 2002	Nicole Kidman	34
May 12, 2003	Halle Berry	36
May 30, 2004	Jennifer Aniston (1)	35
May 8, 2005	Julia Roberts (3)	37
April 28, 2006	Angelina Jolie	30
April 27, 2007	Drew Barrymore	32
May 2, 2008	Kate Hudson (1)	29
May 11, 2009	Christina Applegate	37
April 30, 2010	Julia Roberts (4)	42
April 15, 2011	Jennifer Lopez	41
April 27, 2012	Beyoncé	30
April 26, 2013	Gwyneth Paltrow	40
May 5, 2014	Lupita Nyong'o	31
April 24, 2015	Sandra Bullock	50
April 20, 2016	Jennifer Aniston (2)	47
April 19, 2017	Julia Roberts (5)	49
April 18, 2018	Pink	38
April 24, 2019	Jennifer Garner	47
May 4, 2020	Goldie Hawn	74
May 4, 2020	Kate Hudson (2)	41
May 4, 2020	Rani Hudson Fujikawa	1
April 12, 2021	Chrissy Teigen	34
April 27, 2022	Helen Mirren	76
April 24, 2023	Melissa McCarthy	52
May 1, 2024	Sofia Vergara	51
May 5, 2025	Demi Moore	62
April 20, 2026	Anne Hathaway	43

=== People Magazine Yearbook ===
People Magazine Yearbook is an annual publication released by publishers of People magazine, currently Meredith Corporation. The Yearbook broadly covers all the major events that happened in the year that it covers. This includes socially relevant news events that made headlines around the world in general but more specifically in the United States. Besides the news headlines, it covers celebrity weddings, splits/divorces, births and deaths, and also scandalous events that generated much news when they happened. Over the years, it has covered headlining events in the world of Music (Grammy Awards), Movies (Oscar Awards, The Golden Globe Awards), and Television (Emmy Awards) in a bite sized recap of the event and the award winners. The People Yearbook has had the year (say, 2010) written in Bold accompanying the word "Yearbook" on the front cover since the People Yearbook 1995, although this gradually changed in the more recent editions. Since 2015, the "year" appeared in a more inconspicuous way on the front cover until the 2019 issue and the bold style of writing the "year" made a comeback in the 2020 issue. The year also appears on the spine.

==== Early years ====
The People Magazine Yearbook was first published in the Year 1991 by The Time Inc. Magazine Company and it was called "Private Lives". This issue did not mention any year conspicuously on the front page or the inner page but the front flap of the hardcover version of the magazine described Private Lives as "People's chronicle of an extraordinary year - 1990", clearly describing that the events covered inside were from 1990. Next Year, the 1992 sequel to Private Lives was published and it was called "Private Lives Volume II". The first page had an additional tagline that described the magazine as The Year in Review: 1991 Private Lives. In 1993, there was another change in the publication and also its cover title. The year was added on the cover for the first time and this annual issue was called "Private Lives 1993". The "Year" appeared in Bold on the front cover. The first page described the publication as Private Lives The Year in Review: 1992. Next year, in 1994, People Books released Private Lives 1994 with the first page that said Private Lives Year in Review: 1993. The year 1996 ushered in the single biggest change in the magazine title. The title was reworked and found a new moniker - It was called "People Yearbook 1995". Previous title of "Private Lives" was dropped completely and the publication was defined as a "yearbook" for the first time.

==== Changes over the Years ====
In all the years since its inception, People Magazine Yearbook has covered events from the previous year and not the year on the front cover, and this is true even from the time period when it was called Private Lives. For example, People Magazine Yearbook 2008 covered events of 2007. And People Magazine Yearbook 1998 covered the events of the Year 1997. 2014 was the last year for this to happen. The 2014 yearbook covered events of 2013. In 2015, a shift happened in the magazine that changed for the first time the year it actually covered within its pages. Instead of covering the events of 2014, this issue covered the events of 2015 and arrived on the stands towards the end of 2015. To make the shift properly understood, the first page of this yearbook included a tagline "The Most Memorable Moments of 2015". With this move, People Magazine Yearbook changed its own 25-year-old tradition. This shift, however, resulted in the year 2014 never being covered by the People Magazine Yearbook and 2014 became the only year not to be covered since its inception in 1991. Since then, the People Magazine Yearbook has been covering events of the same year that are on the Front Page. Another typeface change was experimented for two years when People Magazine Yearbook 2013! and People Magazine Yearbook 2014! had an exclamation mark following the year. This was dropped in the 2015 Yearbook and the publication discarded the exclamation mark. However, this issue dropped the Bold writing of the "Year" on the front cover and replaced it with a more inconspicuous style and it was like that until the 2019 issue.

The 2016 Yearbook was a special "flip cover" issue wherein it combined a special edition memorabilia to cherish the memories of people who died in 2016. The list included Prince, David Bowie, Nancy Reagan, Alan Rickman, Doris Roberts, Muhammad Ali etc. The special edition could be accessed by flipping over the magazine. In November 2017, Meredith Corporation announced that it would acquire Time Inc. for $2.8 billion. The acquisition was completed on January 31, 2018. Time Magazine, People Magazine and also People Magazine Yearbook are now published by Meredith Corporation. The copyright of the 2018 Yearbook was described as belonging to Time Inc. Books, a division of Meredith Corporation and published by People Books, an imprint of Time Books. This issue included the tagline, "The Most Memorable Moments of 2018" on the cover. However, in the 2019 Yearbook, the copyright was described as belonging to Meredith Corporation, without any prominent tagline. The prominent bold writing of the "Year" on the front cover made a comeback with the 2020 Yearbook, along with a tagline saying "Our Extraordinary Year Together". The trend continued with the 2021 Yearbook, along with a tagline saying, "When We All Got Together Again".

== Television spinoffs ==
The magazine has inspired the television series People Magazine Investigates, a true crime series which debuted in 2016 on Investigation Discovery, and People Puzzler, a crossword puzzle-themed game show which debuted in 2021 on Game Show Network. In 2024, the six-episode series People Magazine Investigates: Surviving a Serial Killer aired on Investigation Discovery.

An earlier TV version of the magazine began as an entertainment news program, hosted by Alan Hamel, Pat Mitchell and Phyllis George, with Peter Stone as an occasional substitute and it was produced by Time-Life Television, aired on CBS in the fall of 1978, and lasted for a few months.

== See also ==
- People's Magazine – US literary magazine (1906–1924)
