= UFO Investigators League =

The UFO Investigators League (UFOIL) was a UFO group founded by Timothy Green Beckley in the early 1970s. They were a member of the Coalition of Concerned Ufologists and branched into state chapters.

The group re-emerged in 1990 at the following address: Box 753, New Brunswick, New Jersey 08903. At this time the group was seeking to expand its international network of UFO investigators. Membership perks included a membership card, investigators certificate, field manual, and a subscription to the group's newsletter.

== Publications ==
- UFO Investigators League Field Manual. Compiled by Harold D. Salkin and Timothy Green Beckley. 1979. Revision in 1992.
- UFO Spotters Newsletter. 1990.
- Govt.-Alien Liaison? Top-Secret Documents. New Brunswick, NJ: UFO Investigators League, D.d.

== State Chapters ==
=== Kentucky (KUFOIL) ===
Founded in 1981 by John Daily, Director and lead investigator. Field investigators Gary Webster and Rick Ziegler were an asset. It was based out of Covington, Kentucky. This chapter collected monthly membership dues which mostly went to the high costs of reproductions of their field manual, which was based on the UFOIL Manual and MARCEN Manual. The group also investigated ghost hauntings and Bigfoot sightings in addition to UFOs. A drop in reports and dwindling membership numbers resulted in the group's breakup in late 1982.

==== Notable Cases ====
- Big Bone Lick State Park Trailer Park case in 1981. The trailer park no longer exists today, but residents there in the early 1980s reported Bigfoot sightings.
- Fouke Monster (Arkansas) case in April 1982.

=== Ohio (OUFOIL) ===
The earliest reference to this group places it as having a UFO hot line operating in 1973. Its Director was Charles Wilhelm and his wife Geri, and it was based out of Fairfield, Ohio. A secondary location was in Dayton, Ohio and operated by the Director of Investigations, Richard Hoffman. OUFOIL coordinated raw incoming data during the flap of 1973 with Leonard H. Stringfield. It additionally was the host organization for the 1978 MUFON Symposium in Dayton, Ohio. Ron Schaffner, publisher of the cryptozoology journal Creature Chronicles, was the Investigations Director after Richard Hoffman left his position. He joined in 1976 after finding a public service flier in a news room advertising the group.

==== Notable Cases ====
- Landing and humanoids sighting in Goshen, Ohio in 1973. Wilhelm arrived in the area a few days after the event and interviewed witnesses. No physical trace evidence was found.
- Loveland Lizard (Ohio) case of March 1972, reopened by OUFOIL in 1976. Two police officers witnessed a creature "three or four feet tall, weighing around 50 to 75 lbs. Its body looked like leathery textured skin, and had a face resembling a frog or lizard."
- Mothman case of 1966, reopened by OUFOIL in the summer of 1976. Investigators travelled to Point Pleasant, West Virginia to interview witnesses.
- Preble County, Ohio Creature case in 1977. County authorities considered the possibilities of UFO involvement, so they contacted OUFOIL.
- Ross, Ohio Landing Case (April 10, 1983). Three OUFOIL investigators made it to the scene with investigative equipment on the same night as the landing, but nothing unusual was found aside from indentations and broken branches.

==== Publications ====
- The Ohio Skywatcher - Printed and published by R.C. LITHO, Cincinnati, OH.
