= Sioux City mystery plane incident =

1951 unidentified aircraft sighting in Sioux City, Iowa

On the night of January 20, 1951, multiple individuals reported an unidentified cigar-shaped straight-winged aircraft over Sioux City, Iowa. By January 22, papers nationwide publicized had their reports. The incident continues to be discussed in the 21st century.

== Incident ==
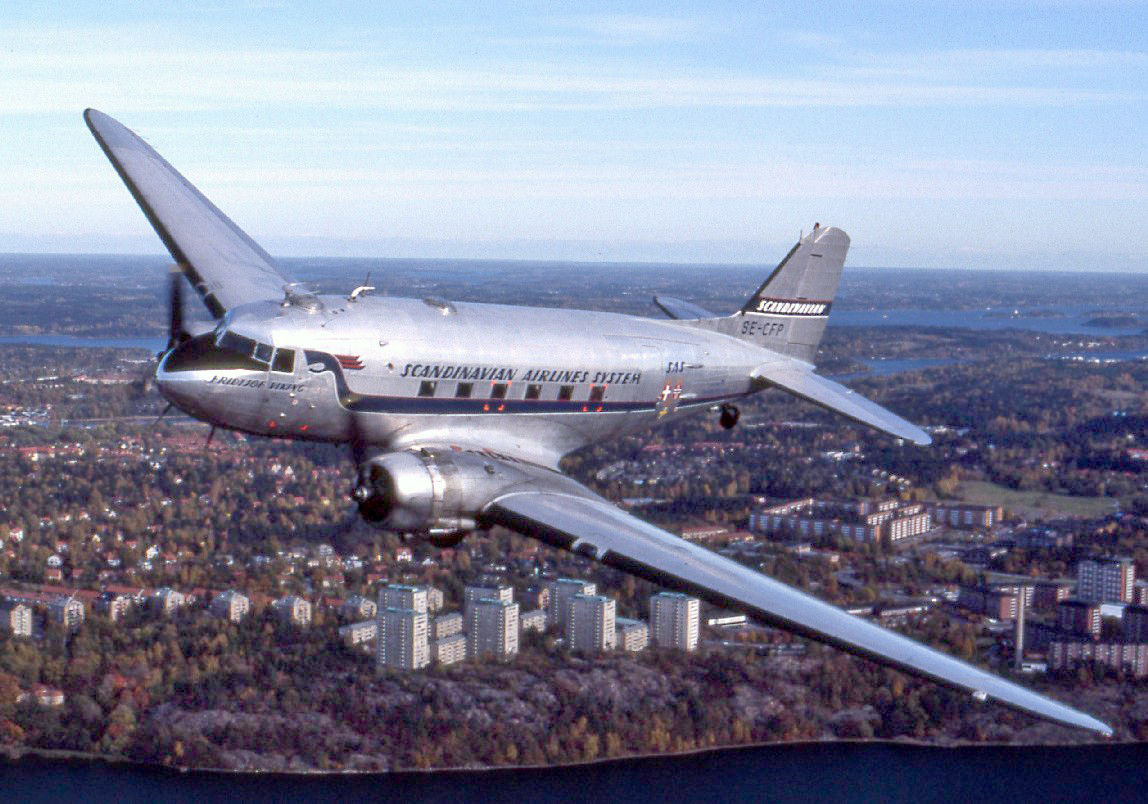
A DC-3 in flight during the daytime, capable of carrying up to 32 passengers. Vinther and Bachmeier piloted a DC-3 on the night of January 20.

Shortly after 8:30 PM, the Sioux City control tower spotted an unidentified red light and estimated its altitude at 8,000 feet. Captain Larry W. Vinther, piloting a Mid-Continent Airlines DC-3 bound for Omaha, took off and climbed to 4,000 feet in an effort to identify the mystery plane. After seeing the mystery plane blink its lights, Vinter spoke into the radio, asking the pilot of the unidentified plane to again blink his lights; Vinter reported the light blinked a second time.

Vinther could see the plane had a "fuselage like a B-29" but estimated that it was "as large or half-against as large" as a B-29. Vinter reported observing the plane's silhouette against the moonlit sky, he could not make out details but could tell that leading edge of its wing was "absolutely straight." Said Vinter: "We've always thought a swept-back wing was necessary but it appears somebody has come up with something new." Co-Pilot Jim Bachmeier corroborated the sighting. The unidentified aircraft reportedly passed under Vinther's plane and continued traveling until it was out of sight. At no point did they observe the plane travelling at "super speeds".

Vinter told press that "Just after I had turned my head to watch him pass, there he was again flying some 200 feet by ours side -- and going in the same direction as we were... You can't turn ordinary planes that fast!"

== Publicity and legacy ==
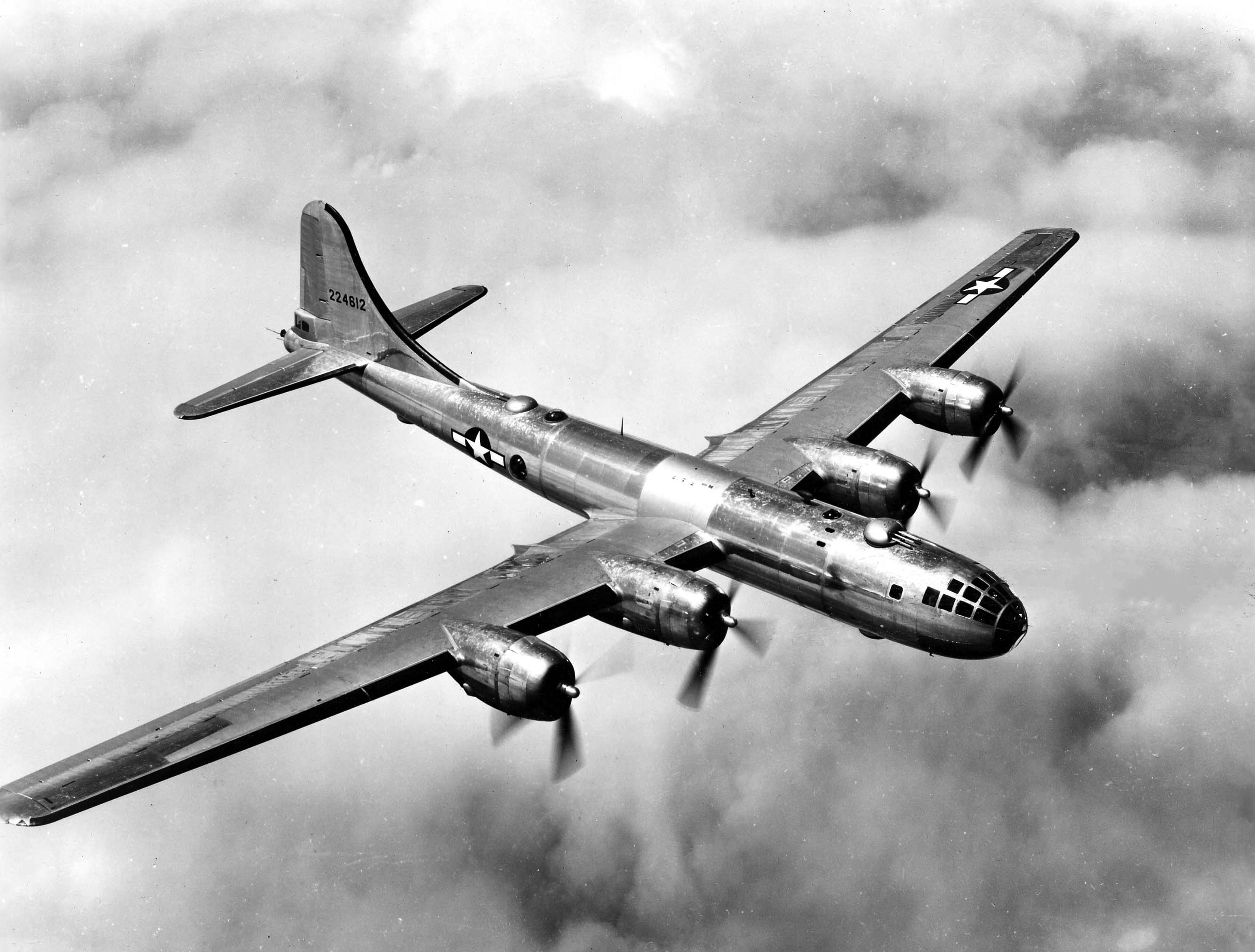
A B-29 Superfortress in flight

The United Press International News Service, and the Associated Press all covered the story in papers nationwide on January 22. Reporters learned that Col. Matthew Thompson of Offutt Air Force Base had been a passenger aboard the flight; While Thompson declined to comment and was reported sleeping at the time, his aide reported seeing the mystery plane. Thompson was, ironically, involved in the Air Force's ongoing investigation into "flying saucers", and took the opportunity to interview the crew. Local press argued the sighting was likely an optical illusion.

In June 1951, Flying magazine published a first-hand account of the sighting authored by Vinter. Aviation Week likewise reported on the sighting. The following year, the incident was covered in Life magazine, then the most widely-read magazine in the nation.

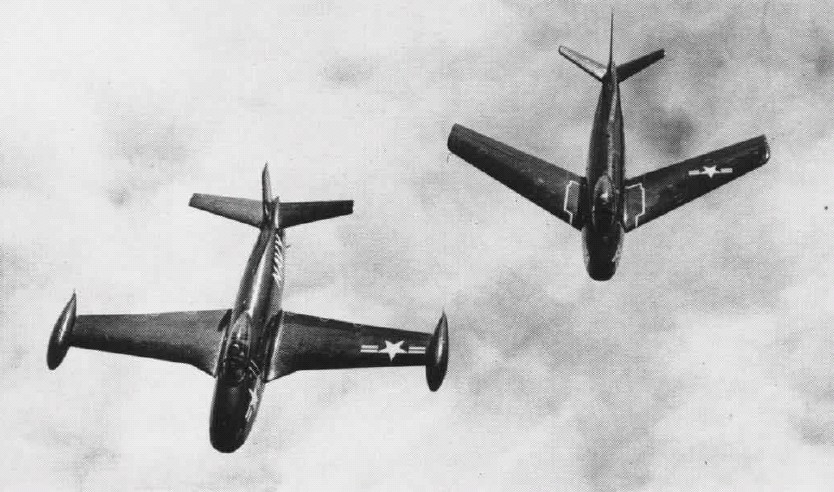
A straight-winged North American FJ-1 flying next to a swept-wing FJ-2 in 1952.

The Air Force response to the incident was detailed in the 1956 book by Project Blue Book chief Edward J. Ruppelt. Ruppelt recalled that an Air Force investigator ultimately attributed the sighting to a B-36 that was in the area of Sioux City at the time, though Ruppelt expressed skepticism, saying "it didn't take an expert to see that a B-36, even one piloted by an experienced idiot, could not do what the UFO had done - buzz a DC-3 that was in an airport traffic pattern." In 1968, physicist and UFO researcher James E. McDonald's testimony before Congress included discussion of the 1951 incident. He concluded that "[Co-pilot] Bachmeier stated to me that, at the time, he felt it had to be some kind of secret device, but, in the ensuing 17 years, we have not heard of any aircraft that can execute instantaneous course-reversal." Local press recalled the incident in 1965 and 1969.

In his 2010 memoir, UFO buff James W. Moseley recalled the incident and his subsequent interviews of its witnesses. In 2021, journalist Ralph Blumenthal detailed the incident in his biography of psychiatrist and "alien abduction experience" researcher John E. Mack.
