= Leon Davidson =

American scientist who helped develop the atomic bomb (1922 – 2007)

- Born: October 18, 1922
- Died: January 1, 2007 (aged 84); White Plains, New York
- Occupations: Scientist, chemical engineer
- Known for: The Manhattan Project, Ufology

Leon Davidson (October 18, 1922 – January 1, 2007) was an American chemical engineer and scientist, and was part of the team that developed the atomic bomb. He is notable for being an early opponent of the extraterrestrial hypothesis, and arguing that UFOs are not best explained as physical spacecraft occupied by extraterrestrial intelligence, but rather as a sophisticated government disinformation campaign that is used to hide experimental military technology.

== Education and early career ==
A native of New York City, Davidson received his B.S. (1943), M.S. (1947) and Ph.D. (1951) in chemical engineering from Columbia University's School of Engineering and Applied Science. He had selected this career at the age of 13 while studying at Stuyvesant High School. During his graduate studies, he was personally selected by future SEAS dean John R. Dunning to join the Manhattan Project, the US atomic bomb development program. After an assignment at the Oak Ridge National Laboratory in Tennessee, he moved his family to Los Alamos, New Mexico, where he eventually became an engineering design supervisor for one of the atomic weapons then under development. He then accepted assignments at the Atomic Energy Commission and the Department of Defense at The Pentagon before moving into the private sector.

== Postwar career ==
In the mid-1950s, he joined the Nuclear Development Corporation of America in White Plains, New York, entering the emerging field of computer technology and development. Following stints in management at several large technology companies including Union Carbide, Teleregister, Western Union, General Precision Laboratories, and IBM (where he was Manager of Advanced Applications Development), he became an independent consultant, working for both government clients including Oak Ridge National Laboratories and commercial clients including Mini-Computer Systems of Elmsford, New York.

On the side, he formed his own technology consulting and design company (Metroprocessing Corporation of America) to explore and exploit the emerging technology of touch-tone dialing (now used for push-button telephones). His goal was to make Metroprocessing the single source of information on the application of the twelve button touch tone telephone to private companies and public agencies.

== Civilian UFO investigatory work ==
In the mid-to-late 1950s, Davidson volunteered at the Civil Defense Filter Center in White Plains, helping track and identify aircraft flying over the New York metropolitan area. He devoted much of his free time to the study of Unidentified Flying Objects (UFOs). He convinced a Congressional committee to force the Air Force to permit him to publish and distribute, in its entirety, the Air Force's Project Blue Book Special Report No. 14, the primary source book on the Air Force's findings related to UFOs.

Davidson firmly believed that the objects reported to be extraterrestrial spacecraft were, in fact, experimental aircraft developed by the Air Force or CIA. According to American historian David M. Jacobs, "Davidson, while originally thinking [UFOs] were secret weapons, later developed the theory that UFOs were nothing but a CIA "front"; the CIA, Davidson explained, had maneuvered or created all UFO club activity, contactees, books, and so on to confound the Soviets about our technological capabilities." Davidson published his theory in Saucer News in early 1959, in an article titled "ECM+CIA=UFO", arguing that the 1952 Washington, D.C., UFO incident was a test by the CIA of electronic counter-measure (ECM) technology. "Since 1951, the CIA has caused or sponsored saucer sightings for its own purposes," Davidson wrote. "By shrewd psychological manipulation, a series of ‘normal’ events has been served up so as to appear as quite convincing evidence of extraterrestrial UFOs...[including] military use of ECM on a classified basis unknown to the radar observers who were involved."

On June 29, 2018, Davidson's son, Edward Davidson, found an article containing a photograph clearly showing two "saucers" in front of a hangar and surrounded by workers, two small planes and a few trucks. In the photo, the left side of the smaller "saucer" is clearly marked "USAF". The larger "saucer" has what appears to be "USAF" also but is not as clearly visible.

== Personal life ==
An avid thinker, Davidson spent many hours analyzing major national and world events, including the Kennedy assassination, questionable Presidential elections and the Jonestown massacre.

Davidson died in White Plains Hospital on January 1, 2007. His ashes are buried in White Plains, New York, He was survived by his wife, Doris, his three children (Ed, Carole, and Martha), his two granddaughters (Leah and Rachel), and his three great-grandsons (Alex, Wesley, and Nathan) and great-granddaughter (Maddie).
