= C.E. Redman =

American photographer (1898–1970)

C. E. Redman
- Born: December 7, 1898; Irvington, Kentucky, U.S.
- Died: January 12, 1970 (aged 71); Albuquerque, New Mexico, U.S.
- Other name: Clarence Eugene Redman
- Occupation: Photographer
- Years active: 1928–1970

Clarence Eugene Redman (December 7, 1898 – January 12, 1970) was an American photographer.

He was Albuquerque, New Mexico's leading commercial photographer for four decades, working for a wide variety of media outlets, public organizations, and private businesses. In 2018, his work was featured in a retrospective titled Everyday People: The Photography of Clarence E. Redman.

== Early life ==
Redman was born December 7, 1898, in Irvington, Kentucky.

At age 19, Redman joined the U.S. Army, serving in World War I. After the war, Redman worked as a brakeman for the Denver and Rio Grande Western Railroad.

He married a music teacher, Bess Curry, and the pair moved to Alamosa, Colorado. Redman and his wife had two children.

In 1928, the family moved to Santa Fe, New Mexico; in 1930, Redman and his family relocated to Albuquerque where he worked for the Ward Hicks Advertising Agency.

== Photography career ==
In 1933, Redman set up his own advertising agency, doing his own photography. In 1938, he told press "I used to just point the camera and let it click but now, oh it's very different. First you measure the distance, then the timing, to say nothing of the exposure and focus, angle, position". Redman began working as a professional photographer, with his work regularly appearing in the city's newspapers.

In 1942, during World War II, Redman again enlisted, serving in the U.S. Army Air Corps. After returning from World War II, Redman set up a commercial photography studio in Albuquerque. By the late 1950s, Redman represented New Mexico as a delegate at national conferences for commercial photographers.

During his career, Redman worked as photographer for the New Mexico State Fair, Albuquerque Public Schools, local newspapers, weddings, graduations, and other events. In 2004, local press recalled how Redman was known to photograph ten weddings a week.

== Legacy ==
Upon his death in 1970, Redman was described by the Associated Press as a pioneering photographer.

Nearly fifty years after his death, in 2018, Redman's work was exhibited at the Albuquerque Museum of Art and History. Jenn Shapland, in a review for Southwest Contemporary, wrote "Redman took photos of mechanics working in their garages, Future Farmers of America members posing with their prized steer, rodeo queen contestants, and soldiers purchasing postcards and candy at the Kirtland Field Post Exchange. His photos captured everyday moments of a way of life that's now largely defunct—or changed so much that it's unrecognizable."
