= Kosmopoisk =

Organization Centered around UFOs

- Космопо́иск
- Nickname: Spacesearch
- Formation: 2004, All-Russian Pseudoscientific Organization
- Founded: 1980
- Founder: Alexander Kazantsev, Vadim Chernobrov, Georgy Beregovoy
- Type: Network of collectives
- Purpose: paleoufology, cryptozoology, mystery investigations
- Headquarters: Moscow, Russia
- Members: 2,500
- Leader: Vadim Chernobrov
- Website: kosmopoisk.ru

Kosmopoisk (Russian: «Космопо́иск», full name: Общеросси́йская нау́чно-иссле́довательская обще́ственная организа́ция, ОНИОО, translated "All-Russian Research Public Organization"), also known as Spacesearch, is a group with interests in ufology, cryptozoology, and other mystery investigations. It started in 1980, and expanded in 2001, to an international movement. In 2004, it registered under the name All-Russian Scientific Organization. Many of the activities are in the form of expeditions to sites that are reputed to have extraterrestrial activity or unusual creatures.

== Formation ==
The organization was founded by Russian science-fiction writer Alexander Kazantsev, aerospace engineer Vadim Chernobrov, astronaut Georgy Beregovoy, and other enthusiasts, in order to explore the mysteries of the universe and nature, research new ways of space technology development, and work on breakthrough branches of science. In 1945, Kanzanstev started to research the Tunguska event of 1908 and link it to a UFO crash and explosion. Two years later, there were UFO sightings in the United States.

In 1980, Chernobrov and his colleagues from the Moscow Aviation Institute created the group whose objectives were to collect information about UFOs and anomalous events in the Soviet Union, to develop a Lovondatr device (also known as "time car"), and to send expeditions to explore the most promising anomalous zones. In 2004, the group registered themselves as Kosmopoisk (All-Russian Scientific Organization). They consider themselves the largest non-commercial public research organization in the world

== Membership ==
The organization has more than 2,500 active members, in more than 100 groups in 25 countries. It has organized more than 250 expeditions.

== Expeditions ==
In the 1990s, the group made expeditions an annual event. To save costs, they would hitchhike as a main way of traveling. For instance, in 1999, the group made an expedition to the remote Labynkyr Lake in Yakutia, Sakha Republic, where an underwater monster, similar to Nessie, has been believed to exist since the 1960s. They hitchhiked the Kolyma federal road to get to Labynkyr Lake in Yakutia. They then collected their results of anomalous events into a database.

One of the events the group would investigate was the meteorite landing at Korenevo in Kaluga Oblast. The meteorite landed in October 1996. The group conducted expeditions annually from 1997 to 2003. They also held a Kosmopoisk conference in May in Korenevo. Its objective was not only to search for the impact point, but also a way to involve a large number of people, mostly from educational institutions, in the public research process. During one expedition to Kaluga they allegedly found a 300 million year old screw.

Another annual event is the "monitoring" expedition to Southern Russia, mostly to Krasnodar Krai to investigate crop circles before they become structurally damaged by tourists. The group deployed "UfoSETI" to collect and analyze the reports about UFO spottings and crop circle discoveries in Russia.

Another popular expedition site is the She-Bear Ridge (Russian: Медведицкая гряда; Medveditskaya gryada), which is situated in Volgograd Oblast. It is considered to be one of the most impressive anomalous zones in Russia, including multiple observations of "triangle UFOs", "crazy lightnings slope", mysterious tunnels, and a possible Lovondatr-7 time travel experiment. The group started exploring the ridge in the 1980s.

In 2002 and 2003, the group made expeditions to Brosno Lake in Tver Oblast in search of the Brosno Dragon, "Brosnya", an underwater creature. The group did a complete sonar underwater scan and coastal monitoring. They concluded that the Brosnya was likely caused by massive gas eruptions from the lake bottom.

From 2002 to 2004, the group made expeditions to Verkhoshizhemye in Kirov Oblast to look for the habitats of bigfoot creatures. They found and photographed some probable camp sites.

In 2002, the group launched a multi-profile expedition to find the Kyshtym dwarf "Aleshenka". They traveled to Kyshtym which is located in the Urals Federal District. The dwarf allegedly appeared in the town in the late 1990s but after it died, its corpse was retrieved by militsiya officers and then was stolen with present whereabouts unknown. The expeditioners collected data, gathered evidence from witnesses, found a possible UFO landing site, and explored a deep Sugomak cave, where they suspect the dwarf beings might have lived.

In May and June 2003, the group held an expedition to the Vitim River in Siberia to investigate the site of the Vitim event, which was a large explosion suspected to be from a comet landing.

In September 2004, the group held an expedition to the Mountains of Ararat in search of Noah's Ark.

== See also ==
- List of UFO organizations

== External links and references ==
- Official website
- Vadim Chernobrov's website
- Belarus-Kosmopoisk at ufo-com.net
