= Lake Murray meteorite =

Meteorite found in the United States

Coordinates: 34.107°N 97.049°W

Lake Murray Meteorite
- Type: Iron
- Class: Magmatic
- Group: IIAB
- Country: US
- Region: Oklahoma
- Fall date: 90 to 110 million years ago
- Found date: 1933
- TKW: 600 pounds (270 kg)

The Lake Murray Meteorite, the largest of its kind ever found in Oklahoma. It was discovered on a farm in Carter County, Oklahoma in 1933. The farm was sold to the state of Oklahoma about the same time for the creation of Lake Murray State Park, for which the specimen was named. The largest piece is on display at the park. Among all meteorites classified as IIAB irons, it ranks as the world’s 11th largest, with a mass of 270 kg.

The meteorite was found on the site of Lake Murray State Park in 1933 by J. C. Dodson, Sr. The core was covered by a sheathing of iron oxide and shale that was about 4 inches (10 cm) thick on the exposed part and up to 6 inches (15 cm) thick on the buried part. When the specimen was removed from the ground and the sheathing removed, the core measured 30 inches (0.76 m) long, 9 inches (23 cm) thick and tapered in width from 24 inches (61 cm) at one end to 9 inches (23 cm) at the other. It weighed 600 pounds (270 kg).

Allen Graffham, a geologist and curator of the park's Tucker Tower museum, was interested in a more scientific study of the object. He contacted Dr. Lincoln LaPaz of the University of New Mexico about the specimen. LaPaz confirmed that it was a meteorite. He assessed that it was composed primarily of nickel and iron, and estimated that it may have weighed 2,000 pounds (910 kg) when it struck, about 90 to 110 million years ago, but that oxidation had since worn away 5 to 6 inches (13 to 15 cm) of the surface.

LaPaz, then the director of the Institute of Meteoritics at the University, carefully cut the specimen into two pieces. He performed additional tests and classed the specimen as octahedrite. He wrote that it could also be an example of a hexaoctahedrite (a transition between hexahedrite and octahedrite). A more recent reference states that the meteorite is an iron meteorite belonging to Group IIAB, which can be classified as either a hexahedrite or a coarsest octahedrite. Chemical analysis showed that the material contained 6.3% nickel (Ni), 0.5% Phosphorus (P), 53.9 parts per million (ppm) Gallium (Ga), 141 ppm Germanium (Ge), and 0.02 ppm Iridium (Ir).

One half of the specimen was retained at Lake Murray, where it has been displayed at the Tucker Tower museum since the early 1950s.

The New England Meteoritical Service has posted several photos taken during analysis of the specimen.
