= Civilian Saucer Intelligence =

American UFO research group

Civilian Saucer Intelligence (CSI) was an independent unidentified flying object research group founded in New York City in 1954. It was initially called Civilian Saucer Intelligence New York, but the "New York" was quickly dropped from their name.

In contrast to the many amateurish early "flying saucer clubs", CSI actually conducted rigorous investigations of UFO reports. The CSI Newsletter was issued quarterly, and UFO researcher Jerome Clark describes it as "the best UFO periodical of its time — well edited, intelligent, thoughtful and critical-minded." (Clark, 188)

They were critical of contactees who claimed to be in regular contact with aliens, but stood apart from other groups by investigating close encounters of the third kind, where animate beings are alleged to be seen as part of UFO sightings.

== History ==
Jerome Clark writes, "Though its membership was small, what the organization lacked in quantity it made up in quality of its personnel" (Clark, 188). CSI's core personnel were Ted Bloecher, Isabel Davis, and Alexander Mebane.

American biochemist Michael D. Swords describes CSI's impressive projects as the result of "the Herculean efforts of three talented UFO researchers ... [t]hey were tough analysts, very difficult to fool with trivial cases." CSI was also notable for translating two books by French ufologist Aimé Michel into English.

Furthermore, according to Swords, CSI became astronomer J. Allen Hynek's main source of UFO reports during the mid-1950s—especially cases from outside the U.S.—after the Robertson Panel (1953) diverted most UFO reports away from Project Blue Book, to which Hynek was consultant.

Though the group never formally disbanded, CSI was defunct by 1959. However, Davis and Bloecher were active in UFO research into the 1980s, Davis as a NICAP associate. Notably, Bloecher investigated an early 1970s UFO sighting made by young painter, Budd Hopkins; in later years, Hopkins would become a key figure in the alien abduction scene.
