= Investigation of UFO reports by the United States government =

- Time period: 1947–present
- Historical precedents: Mystery airships; Ghost rockets; Kenneth Arnold sighting; 1947 UFO craze
- Project or team leaders: Edward Ruppelt (Blue Book); Hector Quintanilla (Blue Book); Edward Condon (Condon Committee); David Spergel (NASA's UAP team); Sean Kirkpatrick (AARO)
- Key events: 1947 Air Force order issued to start UFO study; 1948 Project Sign; 1949 Project Grudge (replaced Sign); 1952–1969 Project Blue Book (replaced Grudge); 1953 Robertson Panel; 1966 Congressional hearing on UFOs; 1968 Condon Committee; 1969 Congressional hearing on UFOs; 1994–1997 Air Force releases official reports on the Roswell incident; 2007–2017 AATIP (dates disputed); 2017–2022 UAPTF (replaced AATIP); 2022 Congressional hearing on UAPs; 2022–present NASA's UAP study team; 2022–present AARO (replaced UAPTF); 2023 Congressional hearing on UAPs
- Websites: www.aaro.mil; science.nasa.gov/uap

Investigation of UFO reports by the United States government has taken place under multiple branches and agencies, past and current, since 1947. In spite of decades of interest, there remains no evidence that there are any UFOs with extraterrestrial origins and, indeed, those identified all have been shown to be natural phenomena, human technology, misapprehensions, delusions, or hoaxes.

The first programs were established under the U.S. Air Force between 1947 and 1969 with Project Sign, Project Grudge, and finally Project Blue Book. The Condon Report in 1968 led the U.S. to stop spending resources on the effort to receive and analyze UFO reports because "nothing has come from the study of UFOs in the past 21 years that has added to scientific knowledge" and "further extensive study of UFOs probably cannot be justified".

In 2017 The New York Times revealed that $22 million had been spent over the past ten years on an unpublicized Advanced Aerospace Threat Identification Program (AATIP) funded by the U.S. Congress. The story also referenced two videos recorded by the U.S. Navy of what officials referred to as "unidentified aerial phenomena", or UAP. In 2020, the Pentagon later released three videos from Navy jets that showed unusual observations and confirmed the provenance of some leaked 2019 videos in two statements made during 2021.

From 2017 to 2020, the Unidentified Aerial Phenomena Task Force (UAPTF) was set up as a program within the Office of Naval Intelligence to "standardize collection and reporting" of sightings of UFOs. On May 17, 2022, members of the U.S. House Intelligence Subcommittee held congressional hearings with top military officials to discuss military reports of UAPs. This was the first public congressional hearing into UFO sightings in the U.S. in over 50 years. In June 2022, plans were announced by NASA to assemble an independent study team. In July 2022, UAPTF was succeeded by the All-domain Anomaly Resolution Office (AARO). The participants of NASA's study team were announced in October 2022. The first public meeting of the NASA team was held on May 31, 2023.

== U.S. government activity from 1947 to 1969 ==
=== Projects Sign, Grudge, and Blue Book ===
Project Sign report

Historian Steven J. Dick wrote in 1998 that although the mass media had spread early interest in UFOs, "it was only when the U.S. Air Force decided to investigate the flying saucer reports that the extraterrestrial hypothesis was recognized at an official level". During 1947 the Air Force collected 147 reports of flying saucers at its Technical Intelligence Division of the Air Materiel Command at Wright Field in Dayton, Ohio, and an order was given on December 30, 1947 to begin a project to study the phenomenon. On January 7, 1948 a "large number of people" reported a UFO near Godman Air Force Base, near Louisville and Fort Knox, Kentucky and "three F-51 planes, led by Captain Thomas Mantell, went to check out the reports". Mantell's "plane crashed after he reported that he was at an altitude of 22,000 feet" and although "investigators concluded that he had blacked out from lack of oxygen" while "chasing a Skyhook balloon outfitted with a camera (later used for secret reconnaissance over Iron Curtain countries)", speculation persisted that Mantell had been "shot down by an extraterrestrial spacecraft", and these "more colorful and exciting extraterrestrial rumors were hard to quash". Dick concludes that the Air Force would face many such "hard lessons" in their investigation of the UFO phenomenon "through Project Sign, set up on January 22, 1948; Project Grudge, set up on December 16, 1948; and finally Project Blue Book, set up in March 1952, and continuing for 17 years" through December 1969.

According to Dick, Project Sign first officially proposed the extraterrestrial UFO hypothesis with an "Estimate of the Situation" in late 1948 concluding "that the UFOs were of extraterrestrial origin". General Hoyt S. Vandenburg, however, disagreed and had the report "returned, declassified, and burned". When Project Grudge took the place of Project Sign at the end of 1948, Dick writes that "it had a less open-minded strategy" and quotes historian David Jacobs as saying that "new staff people replaced many of the old personnel who had leaned toward the extraterrestrial hypothesis" so that Project Grudge "shifted the focus from explaining an unusual phenomenon in the atmosphere as something real to explaining it as illusion". In contrast to this trend, however, Project Grudge hired J. Allen Hynek, an astronomy professor at Ohio State University who advocated throughout his career for U.S. government investment in UFO studies and who later became the associate director of the Smithsonian Astrophysical Observatory, chairman of the Astronomy Department at Northwestern University, and founded the Center for UFO Studies in 1973. When Project Grudge was ordered dissolved, Project Blue Book was developed to replace it, and Lt. Col. N. R. Rosengarten asked Edward J. Ruppelt to take over as the new project's leader, partly because Ruppelt "had a reputation as a good organizer".

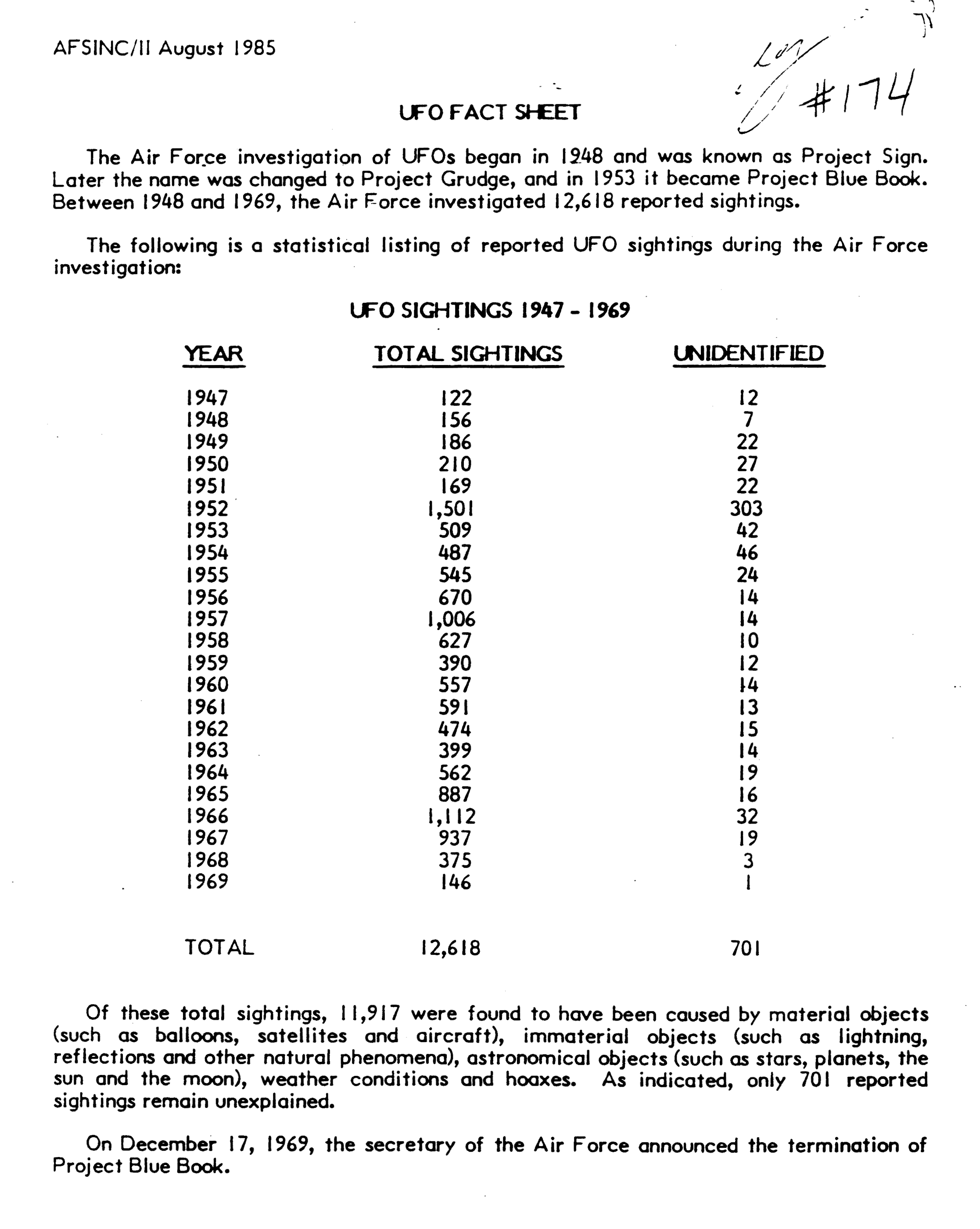
1985 UFO Fact Sheet (page 1 of 3) from the U.S. Air Force

A total of 12,618 reported sightings from 1947 to 1969 were investigated under Projects Sign, Grudge, and Blue Book, with investigations running intermittently from 1948 to 1968 across the three projects. Out of these, "11,917 were found to have been caused by material objects (such as balloons, satellites, and aircraft), immaterial objects (such as lightning, reflections and other natural phenomena), astronomical objects (such as stars, planets, the Sun and the Moon), weather conditions and hoaxes" while 701 remained "unidentified". The year with the highest number of reports was 1952 with 1,501 reports of which 303 were left "unidentified". Robert Sheaffer points out that the unexplained reports generally did not reference enough high-quality information to make any determination and remained unexplained due to ambiguous evidence.

Media accounts and speculation ran rampant in the U.S. at several points during this period, especially in connection to the 1952 UFO scare in Washington, D.C. During the later half of 1952, the Central Intelligence Agency's (CIA) Office of Scientific Investigation (OSI) conducted a study of UFOs in response to orders from the National Security Council (NSC). One December 1952 memo by H. Marshall Chadwell, Assistant Director of OSI, to Walter Bedell Smith, CIA Director, read that "reports of incidents convince us that there is something going on that must have immediate attention" and that "sightings of unexplained objects at great altitudes and traveling at high speeds in the vicinity of major U.S. defense installations" cannot be "attributable to natural phenomena or any known types of aerial vehicles". The OSI drafted a memorandum from the DCI to the NSC proposing that the NSC establish an investigation of UFOs as a priority project throughout the intelligence and the defense research and development community, and it urged the DCI to establish an external research project of top-level scientists to analyze the problem. This team of scientists came to be known as the Robertson Panel. The OSI investigation was called off after the Robertson Panel's conclusion in January 1953 that the situation had become sensationalized. Members of the 1953 Robertson Panel worried that "genuine incursions" by enemy aircraft "over U.S. territory could be lost in a maelstrom of kooky hallucination" of UFO reports.

Following the Robertson Panel, "Air Force Regulation 200-2, Unidentified Flying Objects Reporting" was issued and updated on August 12, 1954 after the 4602 Air Intelligence Service Squadron (4602nd AISS) was brought in to assist Project Blue Book and the USAF Air Technical Intelligence Center with preliminary and field UFO investigations. Regulation 200-2 stated that "it is permissible to inform news media representatives on UFOB's when the object is positively identified as a familiar object" while for "those objects which are not explainable, only the fact that ATIC will analyze the data is worthy of release, due to many unknowns involved". Such secretive layers in government UFO investigations encouraged later conspiracy theories such as the Majestic 12.

=== Condon Report and Congressional hearings ===
The Condon Report in 1968 led the U.S. to stop spending resources on the effort to receive and analyze UFO reports because "nothing has come from the study of UFOs in the past 21 years that has added to scientific knowledge" and "further extensive study of UFOs probably cannot be justified". In addition to these three projects administered by the U.S. Air Force, Congressional hearings were held on the UFO topic in 1966 and again in 1969.

=== Overview of government activity from 1947 to 1969 ===
Historian Greg Eghigian writes that "archival records show that most military and defense authorities involved in investigating UFOs concluded very early in their work that the objects—regardless of whether they were considered real or not—posed no threat to national security" but that because "the investigations necessarily had to be aware of classified aviation projects that might be mistaken for UFOs, they were typically shrouded in secrecy". According to Eghigian, in contrast to the U.S. and its continued classification of many UFO records, "beginning with France in 2007, most governments with UFO desks have publicly released their formerly classified documents, having convinced themselves that there was little reason to keep them confidential". Two exceptions to the early and widely-held consensus that governments should not invest resources in the investigation of UFO reports were J. Allen Hynek and Nick Pope. Hynek was the leading scientific consultant for Project Blue Book and claimed that UFOs studies had the potential to advance scientific knowledge. Pope oversaw Great Britain's UFO desk from 1991 to 1994 and maintained that "whatever the true nature of this phenomenon, it raises important defence, national security and air safety issues". Robert Sheaffer has written that, out of all the reports that Project Blue Book amassed, "none of them amounted to anything significant, or added to our knowledge of any subject, even after more than 50 years of investigation".

== U.S. government inactivity from 1969 to 2017 ==
During a period of 48 years from 1969 onward, the U.S. government did not have public programs for the investigation of UFOs. There was a request on July 21, 1977, when Frank Press, Science Advisor to President Jimmy Carter, sent a letter to Robert A. Frosch, the fifth administrator of NASA, asking if the space agency could reopen investigations into UFOs. Frosch responded on September 6, 1977 indicating that NASA was "inclined to agree with your recommendation" if there was funding for "a panel of inquiry such as you suggest" with a "NASA project officer to review reports of the last ten years and to provide a specific recommendation relative to any further inquiry by the end of this year". However, on December 21, 1977, Frosch wrote a second letter in response to president Carter in which he "proposed" that "NASA take no steps to establish a research activity in this area [UFOs] or to convene a symposium on the subject".

With a resurgence of mass media interest in the 1947 Roswell incident from 1978 and onward, the U.S. Air Force had two investigative reports produced: "Report of Air Force Research Regarding the 'Roswell Incident'" in 1994 and "The Roswell Report: Case Closed, Headquarters United States Air Force, written by Capt. James McAndrew" in 1997.

== U.S. government activity from 2017 to present ==
Beginning in 2017, a series of media disclosures, congressional hearings, and legislative actions brought renewed U.S. government attention to unidentified anomalous phenomena. The period saw the creation of dedicated investigation offices, the public release of military sensor footage, whistleblower testimony before Congress, and bipartisan efforts to mandate greater transparency around government-held UAP records.

=== Formation of UAPTF and Pentagon release of UAP videos ===
In 2017, reports in The New York Times, Politico, and The Washington Post revealed that $22 million had been spent over the past ten years on a small and unpublicized Advanced Aerospace Threat Identification Program funded by the U. S. Congress. According to journalist and historian Garrett Graff, this reporting in 2017 "really kicked off a remarkable change in the conversation around UFOs" as the government started working "to destigmatize the idea of flying saucers or UFOs". The 2017 reporting also "included two videos, recorded by the Navy, of what were being described in official channels as 'unidentified aerial phenomena', or U.A.P.". The Pentagon released videos of UAPs in 2020 and confirmed the provenance of some leaked 2019 videos in two statements made during 2021.

From 2017 to 2022, the Unidentified Aerial Phenomena Task Force (UAPTF) was set up as a program within the Office of Naval Intelligence to "standardize collection and reporting" of sightings of UFOs.

Former president Barack Obama stated in June 2021 that "there's footage and records of objects in the skies, that we don't know exactly what they are", and a report from the U.S. Director of National Intelligence called "Preliminary Assessment: Unidentified Aerial Phenomena" (or UAP Report) was issued on June 25, 2021.

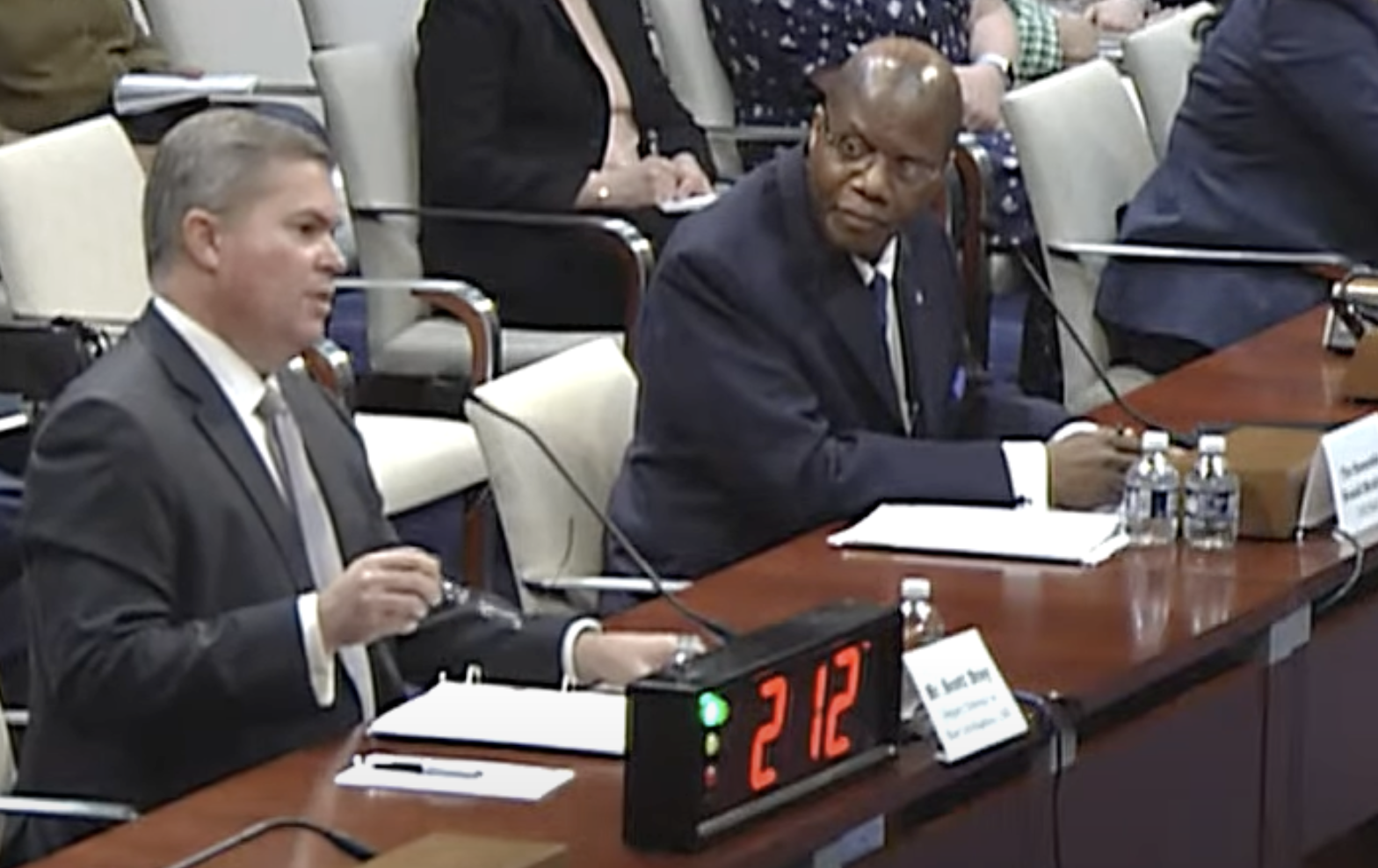
Scott Bray, deputy director of naval intelligence, and Ronald Moultrie, the Defense Department's under secretary for intelligence, testify before the House Permanent Select Committee on Intelligence during the May 17, 2022 hearing on UAPs

On May 17, 2022, members of the House Intelligence Subcommittee held congressional hearings with Scott Bray, deputy director of naval intelligence, and Ronald Moultrie, the Defense Department's under secretary for intelligence, to discuss military reports of unexplained aerial phenomena (UAPs). These Pentagon officials reported a database of 400 UAP incidents which was a substantial increase from 143 incidents in the UAP Report released a year earlier. This was the first public congressional hearing into UFO sightings in the U.S. in over 50 years.

In July 2022, the UAPTF was succeeded the All-domain Anomaly Resolution Office (AARO).

=== Formation of NASA's UAP study team and the Pentagon's AARO ===
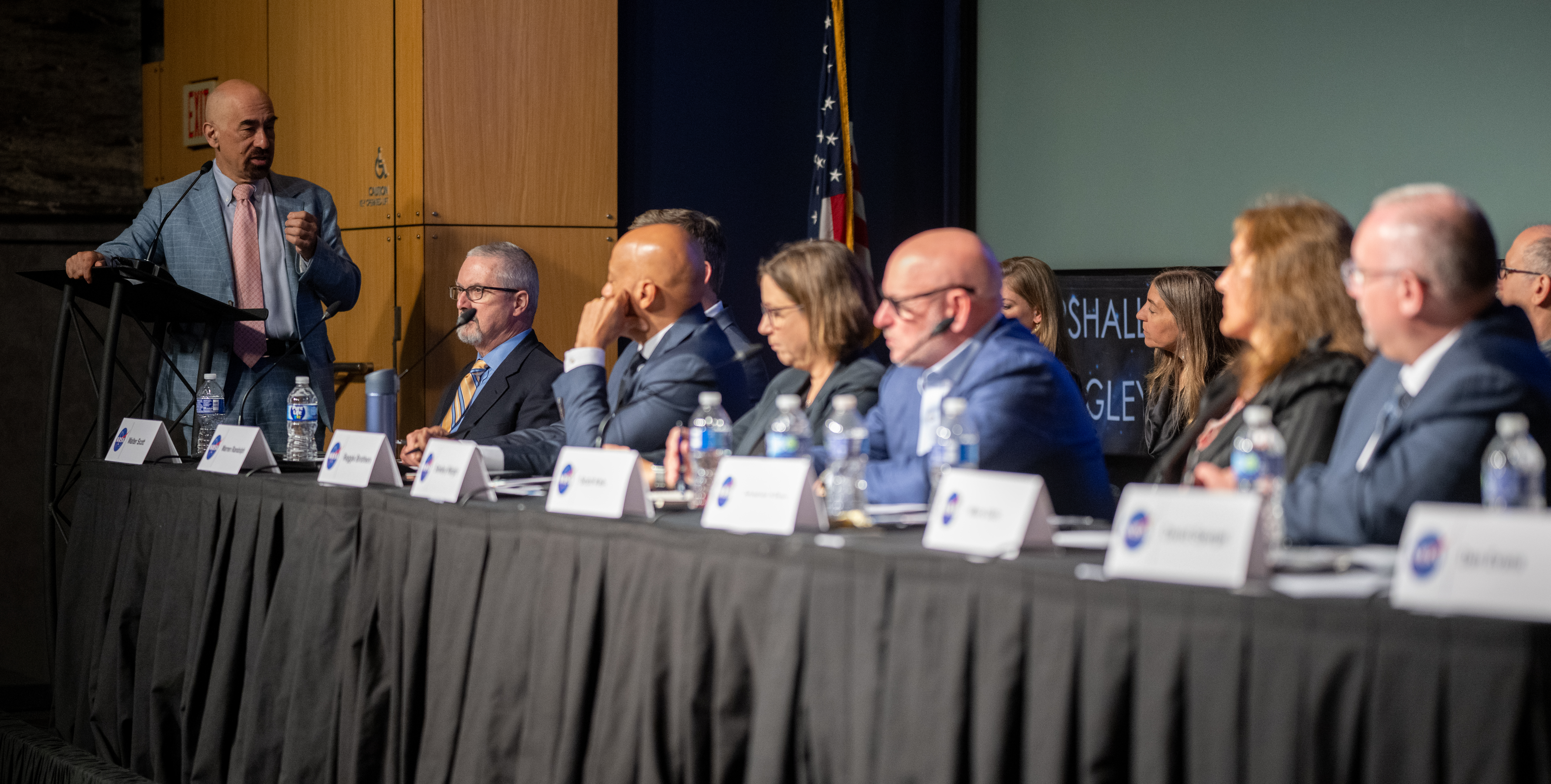
David Spergel, chair of NASA's independent study on UAPs, answering a question during the team's May 31, 2023 public meeting

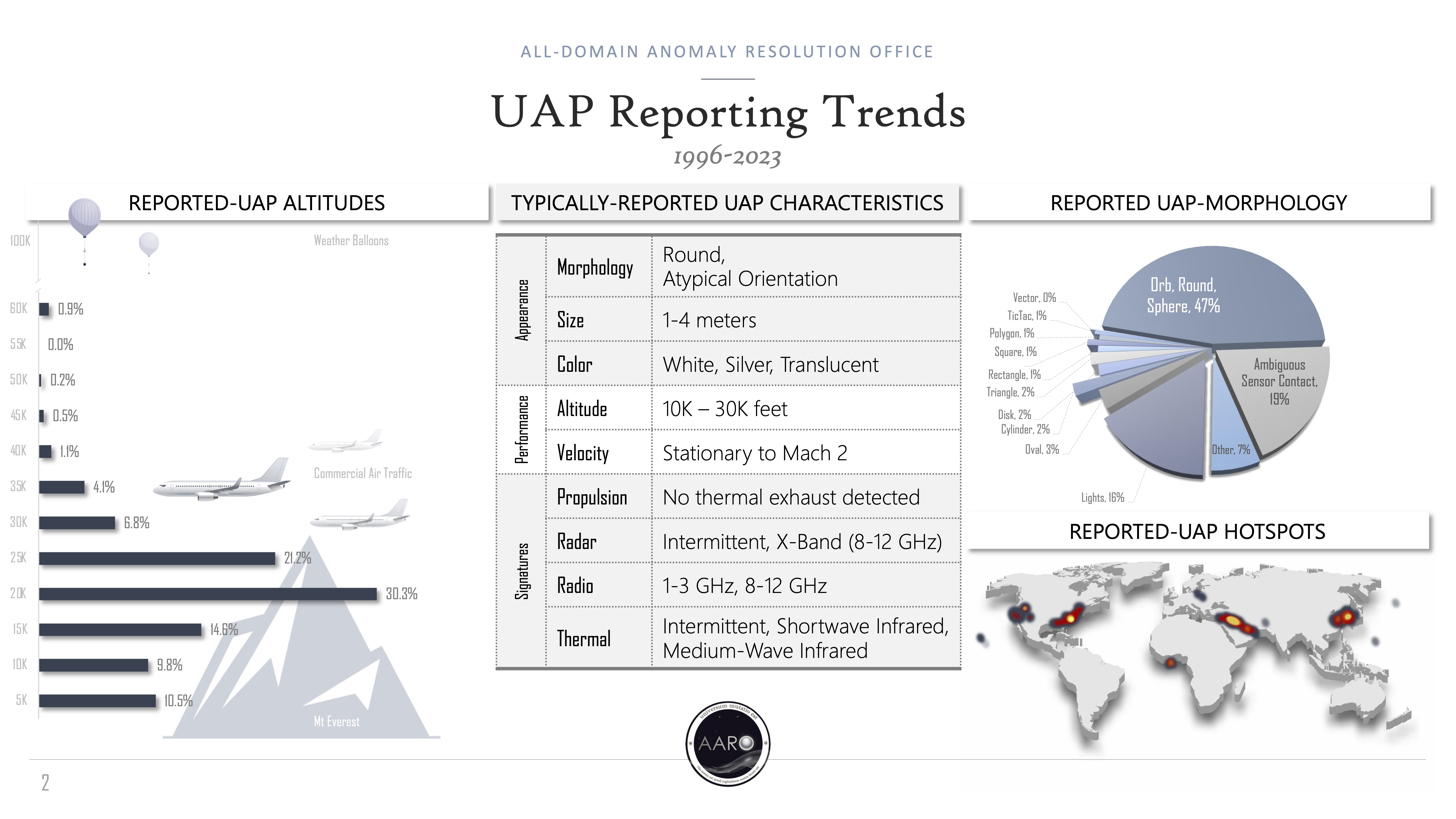
Slide from presentation by Sean Kirkpatrick, Director of AARO, on May 31, 2023 to NASA's UAP independent study team

In June 2022, NASA announced that it was commissioning the Unidentified Anomalous Phenomena Independent Study Team to investigate reports of unidentified anomalous phenomena. The participants in NASA's UAP independent study team were announced in October 2022. The first public meeting of NASA's UAP independent study team was held on May 31, 2023.

Sean Kirkpatrick, director of the Defense Department's AARO, testified on April 19, 2023 as sole witness before a subcommittee of the Senate Armed Services Committee in a hearing about UAPs chaired by Senator Kirsten Gillibrand (D-NY). Avi Loeb, a Harvard astrophysicist and founder of his own project that aimed to study UFOs, wrote that Kirkpatrick's testimony showed the need for more intentional and high-quality data collection related to UAPs.

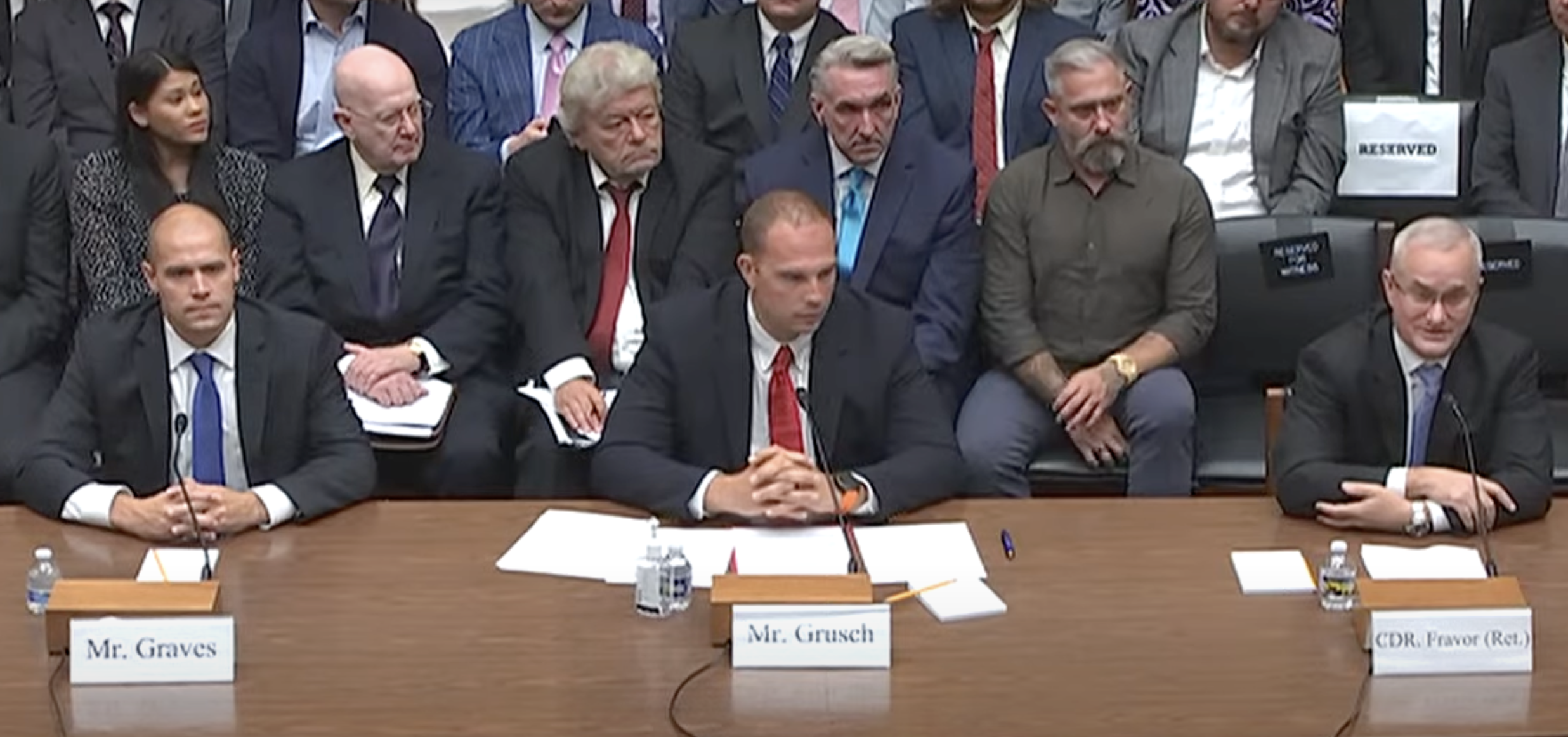
Congressional hearing on July 26, 2023, under the U.S. House Committee on Oversight and Accountability, with Ryan Graves, David Grusch, and David Fravor

On July 26, 2023, under the House Committee on Oversight and Accountability, another Congressional hearing took place featuring testimony from David Grusch alongside testimony from U.S. fighter pilots Ryan Graves and David Fravor on experiences related to unidentified aerial phenomena (UAP). During this Congressional hearing, Grusch said that he "was informed in the course of my official duties of a multi-decade UAP crash retrieval and reverse engineering program to which I was denied access" and that he believes that the U.S. government is in possession of UAP based on his interviews with 40 witnesses over four years. Grusch claimed in response to Congressional questions that the U.S. has retrieved "non-human" biological matter from the pilots of the crafts and that this "was the assessment of people with direct knowledge on the [UAP] program I talked to, that are currently still on the program". When asked by U.S. Representative Tim Burchett during this July 26 hearing, if Grusch had "personal knowledge of people who've been harmed or injured in efforts to cover up or conceal" the government's possession of "extraterrestrial technology," Grusch said yes but that he was not able to provide details except within a SCIF.

On August 10, 2023, Politico reported that AARO's congressionally mandated public website and reporting mechanism had been delayed within the Pentagon. The Department of Defense launched AARO's public website on August 31, 2023, and launched a secure reporting mechanism on October 31, 2023 for current and former U.S. government personnel with direct knowledge of alleged UAP-related government programs or activities.

Deputy Secretary of Defense Kathleen Hicks announced on August 30, 2023 that Kirkpatrick as AARO's director would report directly to her, and the Department of Defense launched AARO's public website on August 31, 2023.

In October 2023, the joint Office of the Director of National Intelligence and Department of Defense FY2023 annual report stated that, as of April 30, 2023, AARO had received a total of 801 UAP reports. AARO announced the second phase of a secure reporting mechanism for current or former U.S. government employees, service members, and contractors with direct knowledge of alleged U.S. government UAP programs or activities dating back to 1945; AARO said those submissions would inform its Historical Record Report. In March 2024, AARO released its Historical Record Report, which stated that no U.S. government investigation, academic-sponsored research, or official review panel had confirmed that any UAP sighting represented extraterrestrial technology, and that most sightings were ordinary objects and phenomena resulting from misidentification.

=== UAP Disclosure Act ===
In July 2023, Senate Majority Leader Chuck Schumer and Senator Mike Rounds introduced the Unidentified Anomalous Phenomena Disclosure Act of 2023 as an amendment to S. 2226, the Senate version of the National Defense Authorization Act for Fiscal Year 2024. Sections 1841 to 1843 of the version enacted in December 2023 as part of the National Defense Authorization Act for Fiscal Year 2024 required the National Archives and Records Administration to establish an Unidentified Anomalous Phenomena Records Collection and directed federal agencies to identify, review, and transmit relevant UAP records for disclosure, subject to statutory postponement standards.

Unidentified Aerial Phenomena (UAP) reporting requirements were substantially strengthened while any funding of secret UAP retrieval or reverse engineering programs was made illegal as part of the Fiscal Year 2024 Intelligence Authorization Act (IAA, S. 2103) passed unanimously on June 14, 2023 by the Senate Intelligence Committee as draft legislation yet to be brought before the full Senate and House for passage. Also, with broad bipartisan support, Senator Chuck Schumer, the majority leader, has proposed legislation (as an amendment to the 2024 annual defense policy bill) to create a commission tasked with declassifying government UFO documents in an effort similar to the JFK Records Act of 1992.

== See also ==
- Age of Disclosure – 2025 American UFO documentary film
- Identification studies of UFOs
- List of reported UFO sightings

== Sources ==
- Dick, Steven J. (1998). "Chapter 5: The UFO Controversy and the Extraterrestrial Hypothesis". Life on Other Worlds: The 20th-Century Extraterrestrial Life Debate. Cambridge, UK: Cambridge University Press. ISBN 0521620120.
- Eghigian, Greg (19 December 2017). "That Secret Government Program to Track UFOs? It's Not the First". Smithsonian. Archived from the original on 9 July 2023.
- Jacobs, David Michael (1975). The UFO Controversy In America. Bloomington, Indiana: Indiana University Press. ISBN 0-253-19006-1.
