= United States UFO files =

U.S. government documents declassified in 2026

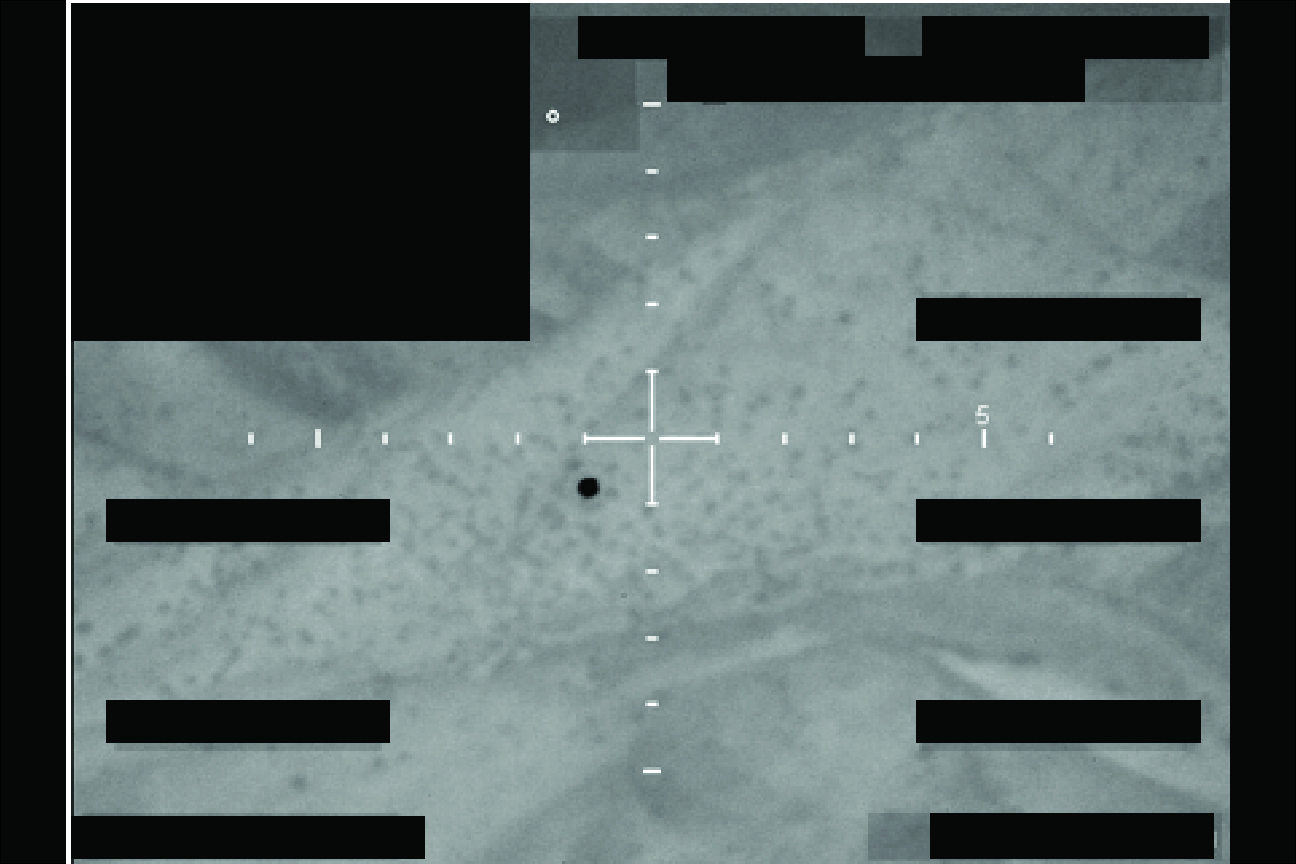
- A UFO over western United States in December 2025
- Created: 1944–2026
- Presented: May 8, 2026; 6 months ago
- Date effective: February 20, 2026; 9 months ago
- Location: United States
- Commissioned by: Project Sign; Project Grudge; Project Blue Book
- Author: United States Government
- Media type: PDFs, reports, memos, briefing papers
- Subject: Unidentified anomalous phenomena in the United States
- Purpose: Analysis and classification; Intelligence gathering; Standardising reporting; Transparency

Official website
- www.war.gov/ufo/

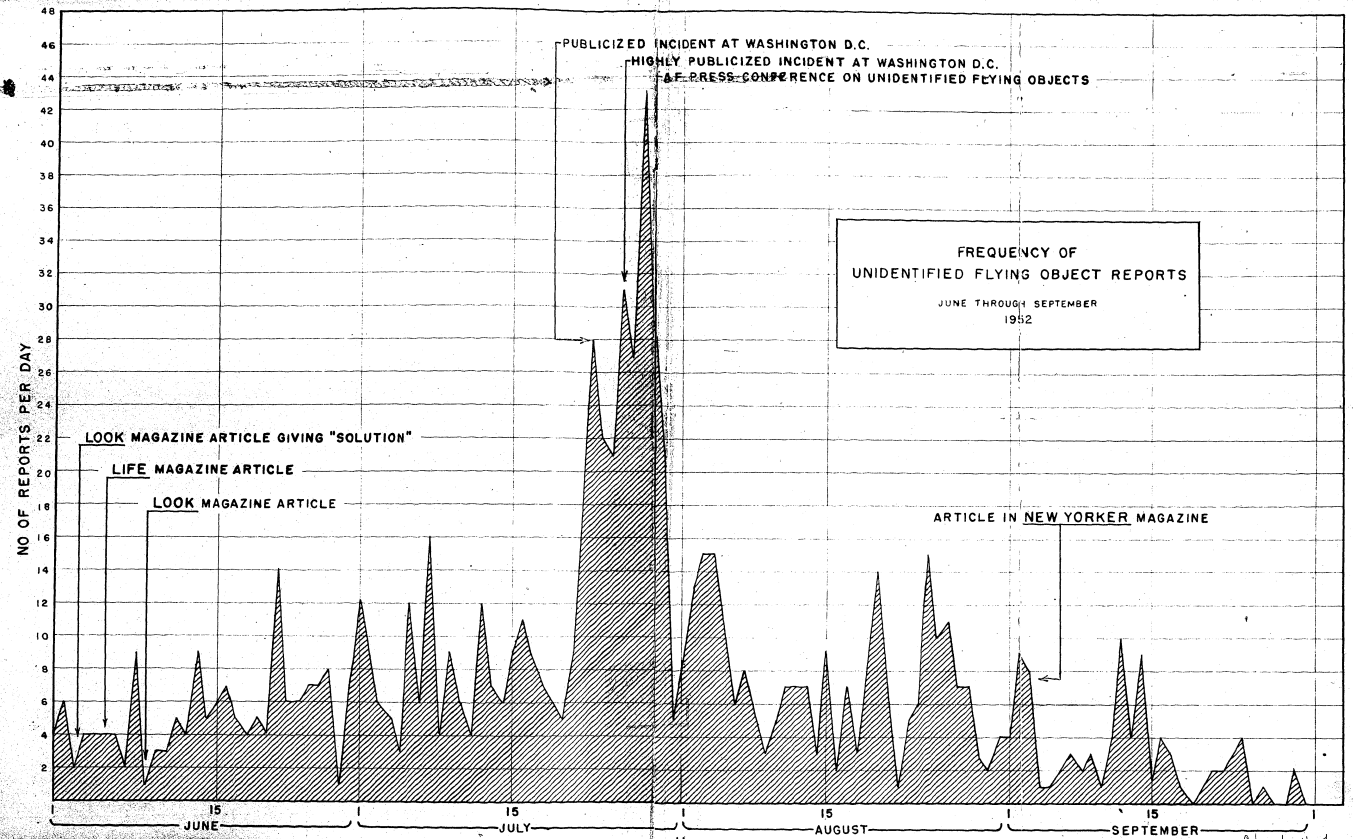
Air Force frequency graph of UFO reports

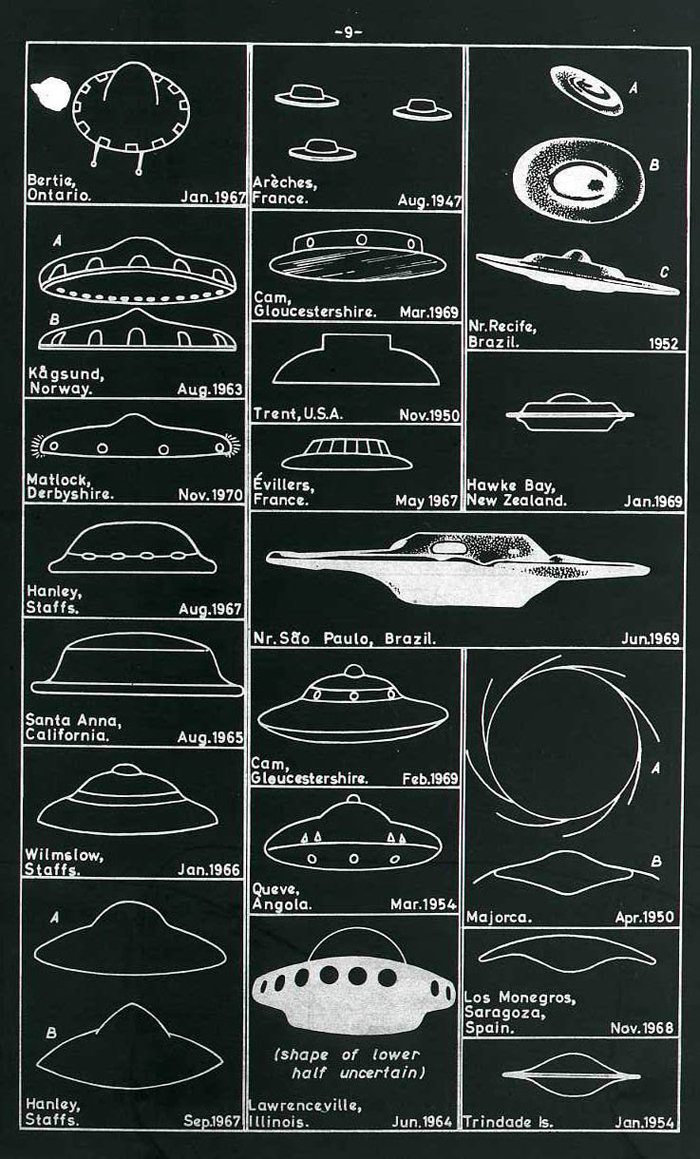
A UFO sightings chart

The United States UFO files, (Note: The United States UAP files also have several other names (The Trump UFO files, The Alien files, etc).) officially known as the Presidential Unsealing and Reporting System for UAP Encounters (PURSUE), also referred to as the UFO files or the UAP files, are a collection of declassified United States government records concerning UFOs, also called unidentified anomalous phenomena (UAPs), released by the administration of Donald Trump beginning on May 8, 2026.

The files were published through the Presidential Unsealing and Reporting System for UAP Encounters (PURSUE), a government website created to release reviewed UAP-related material to the public. The first release included reports, photographs, videos, witness accounts, military records, astronaut transcripts, and other historical materials connected to unresolved sightings and investigations dating from 1944 and 1945 to recent years.

The initial release followed years of renewed U.S. government and congressional attention to UFOs, including the public disclosure of the Pentagon UFO videos, the creation of the All-domain Anomaly Resolution Office (AARO), congressional hearings, and pressure from members of Congress who argued that the government should disclose more information about UFOs and alleged extraterrestrial matters. In February 2026, Trump directed federal agencies to identify and declassify records connected to UFOs and extraterrestrials.

The first release of records did not confirm the existence of extraterrestrial life. The Pentagon described the released materials as unresolved cases for which the government could not make a definitive determination based on available evidence, while some scientists and skeptics said many of the files were ambiguous, previously public, or potentially explainable as camera artifacts, balloons, debris, or unreliable eyewitness accounts.

The second release of files was on May 22, 2026. The third release was on June 12 of that same year, the fourth on July 10, and the fifth on August 7.

== Background ==
Belief that the U.S. Government is concealing information related to non-human intelligence, aliens or extraterrestrials visiting Earth is a long-running conspiracy theory.

Beginning in 2017, the New York Times and other outlets disclosed the Pentagon UFO videos and secret government programs to investigate "unusual, seemingly inexplicable phenomena", as The Washington Post described them. Bipartisan pressure in Congress combined with military interests around unexplained UFO encounters for multiple years had increased related to reports of incidents by defense and intelligence officials, radar operators, and pilots. Congress had previously created the All-domain Anomaly Resolution Office in 2022 to "investigate anomalous incidents observed across air, maritime, space and other domains", reported Military.com.

In 2022, NASA conducted an inquiry into the potential of space aliens visiting Earth and found no evidence to support such a notion. Two years later, in 2024, the U.S. Department of Defense officially disclaimed it had any information pertaining to the existence of extraterrestrial life or that it had recovered technology belonging to space aliens. Donald Trump, Barack Obama, and Bill Clinton have all stated their disbelief in any anomalous explanation for UFOs and denied the existence of any U.S. government secrecy surrounding the topic. U.S. government agencies have released videos of aircraft, which, according to The Washington Post, "appeared to defy the laws of physics". Congressional hearings in the past decade included testimony from government, military, and intelligence witness of UFO events, while skeptics claimed the U.S. military and intelligence reports and data were unreliable.

In February 2026, U.S. President Donald Trump ordered federal agencies to identify and declassify to the public files connected to UFOs, UAPs, and extraterrestrials. The move followed agitation by several Republican members of the U.S. Congress, such as Anna Paulina Luna and Tim Burchett, who claimed the U.S. government was withholding secrets about space aliens. The month following Trump's directive, Luna demanded Secretary of Defense Pete Hegseth send her some videos of UFOs by a deadline she established; according to the Associated Press, Luna's demand "came and went, and no videos were produced".

== Conspiracy theories ==
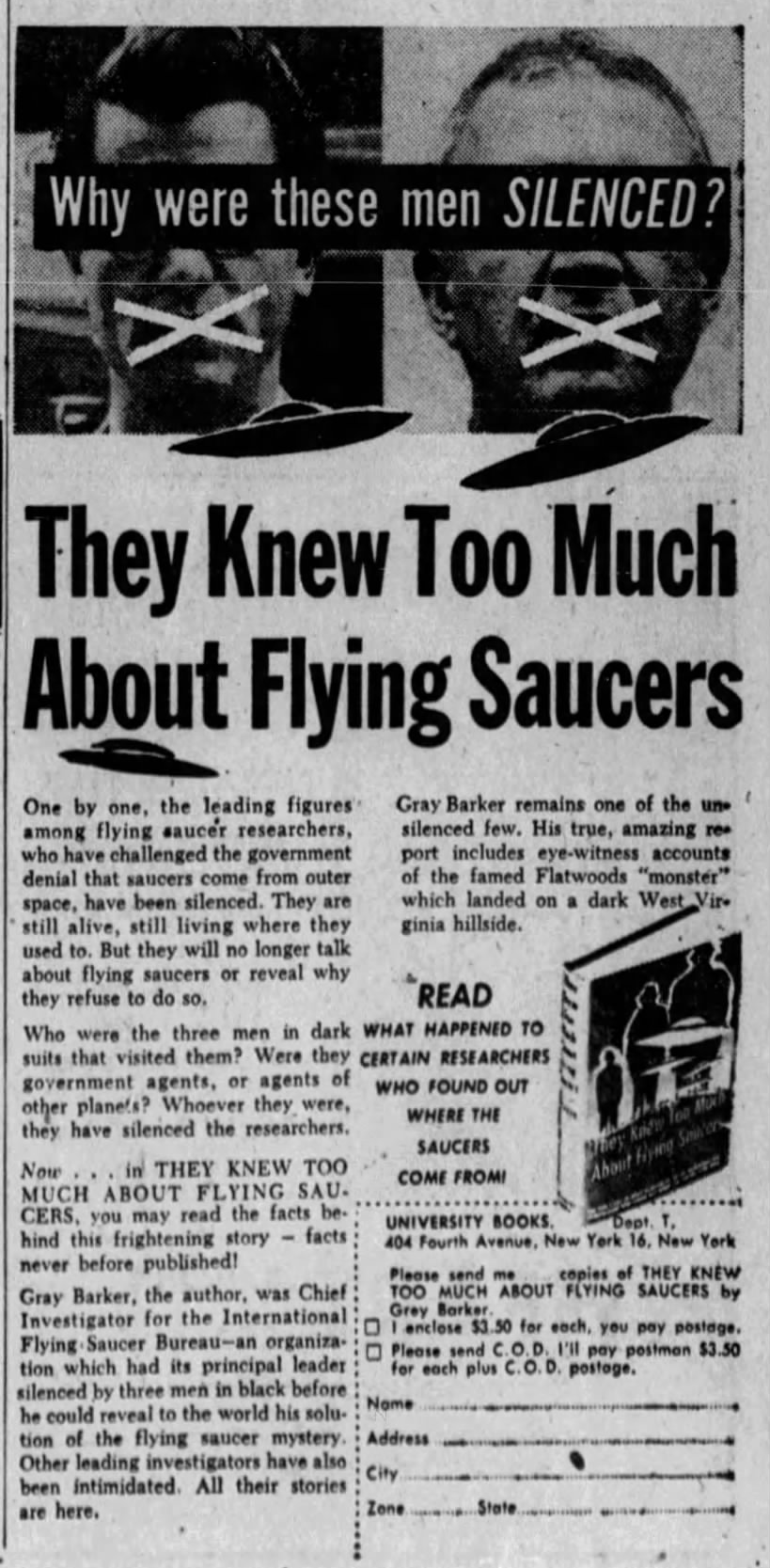
Advertisement in 1956 for the book They Knew Too Much About Flying Saucers

Some conspiracy theories claim that governments and political figures around the world are concealing evidence that unidentified flying objects (UFOs) are operated by extraterrestrial or "non-human" intelligence or created using alien technology.

Since the 1980s, many conspiracy theories have argued that governments around the world are in contact or cooperating with extraterrestrials, with some also claiming that governments are knowingly allowing cattle mutilations and alien abductions.

Mainstream scientists, government investigators, and skeptics state that there is little to no evidence supporting conspiracy theories about alien visitation. Despite allegations of cover-ups, conspiracy theories involving alien spacecraft generally lack verifiable proof, instead relying on speculation, anecdotal accounts, and misidentified surveillance technology.

== Initial release ==
The May 8, 2026 release was the first PURSUE collection of declassified U.S. government records on unresolved UFO cases, including reports, photographs, videos, and historical documents. Officials described it as the beginning of a rolling disclosure process, with additional materials to be posted as they were reviewed and declassified.

=== Details ===
The Department of Defense of the United States on May 8, 2026, launched the Presidential Unsealing and Reporting System for UAP Encounters (PURSUE) to release military data related to the UFO phenomena. The files were published through a newly launched PURSUE government website. The administration stated that additional files would continue to be released over time. Defense Secretary Pete Hegseth said the goal was to provide "maximum transparency" regarding the government's knowledge of unexplained aerial phenomena. Director of National Intelligence Tulsi Gabbard described a "comprehensive" multi-agency declassification program being underway. Included in the initial tranche of videos and material are Apollo mission photos, NASA transcripts of astronauts discussing lunar UFOs, witnesses claiming "cigar-shaped" object at a restricted government test facility, and land law enforcement reports of "orbs launching other orbs". The DOD's All-domain Anomaly Resolution Office identified the law enforcement orb video as "among the most compelling".

The release was presented as part of a broader transparency initiative involving the Department of Energy, United States Department of Defense, the Office of the Director of National Intelligence, NASA, the FBI, and other federal agencies.

The first tranche of documents included more than 160 files containing military reports, witness interviews, pilot accounts, government memos, photographs, and videos connected to UAP sightings dating back decades. Many of the records focused on unexplained aerial objects observed by military personnel, astronauts, and drone operators. The current and forthcoming disclosures of UFO-related information were in response to years-long Pentagon and Congressional investigations, along with military and intelligence officials reporting that some incidents remained unexplained.

Contents of the first tranche spanned a period from 1944 and 1945 to the near present and included both documents and 20 videos, showing what the New York Times described as "murky still images that show what could be anything".

Several still images from U.S. crewed space missions to the Moon were also included, which, according to New Scientist, had "already been investigated and explained as micrometeoroid impacts on the Moon or the spacecraft, bits of floating debris, and camera or film defects". Many of the initially released cases remain unresolved due to limited data or unclear imagery, and The Pentagon noted that several photos and videos had not yet been fully analyzed.

Among the documents released were Apollo mission transcripts. Buzz Aldrin, an American astronaut who was onboard the Apollo 11 spacecraft, described sightings of unusual lights and objects seen during space missions, with some being reported to have been on the Moon in the 1960s and 1970s. On the Apollo 17 flight, a photograph showed "three 'dots' in a triangular formation in the lower right quadrant of the lunar sky". Other documents in the UAP files also described sightings of glowing or metallic objects near military training zones and restricted airspace across America. Some recent 2024 and 2025 reports included accounts from drone pilots and service members who described objects moving in ways they could not explain.

The Pentagon confirmed there are no known explanations for the currently released videos, saying, "The materials archived here are unresolved cases, meaning the government is unable to make a definitive determination on the nature of the observed phenomena." The release was followed closely by a Truth Social post by president of the United States Donald Trump in which he encouraged the public to "have fun and enjoy!".

=== Public reception ===
Reception to the initial May 8 release of UFO records was mixed, with calls for further evidence, previously unseen materials, and evidence of alien life to be released, if available. Despite public excitement surrounding the initial release, the Pentagon and Trump said that the documents do not provide confirmed evidence of extraterrestrial life and that "the public can draw their own conclusions".

==== Government officials ====
On social media, Marjorie Taylor Greene, former member of the United States House of Representatives, posted of the May 8 group that "unless they roll out live aliens and test demo UFOs or actually admit what we know this really is, then I have way better things to do on this Friday".

==== Media ====
According to IGN, many UFO fans had a mixed reaction on social media to the release of the initial files, with some expressing confusion at the inclusion of computer-generated imagery and others claiming the release included material that had been circulating in paranormal books and media for decades.

==== Scientists ====
The reaction from scientists to the initial tranche of the May 2026 disclosure content was mixed. David Whitehouse, an astrophysicist and former science journalist for the BBC, in a post to social media explained he had reviewed the materials and concluded that "some are optical artefacts, others fuzzy blobs, and some light smears. Some obviously balloons. No hint, no evidence whatsoever of anything artificial and alien". Michael Narlock, an astronomer at the Cranbrook Institute of Science, said of the documents that they largely contained transcripts of eyewitness accounts, which were "notoriously unreliable" while the videos lacked sufficient context to assess. Seth Shostak, senior astronomer at the SETI Institute, asked by CBS News to react to the release, affirmed his view that "there is no compelling evidence for extraterrestrial life thus far". Sean M. Kirkpatrick, a physicist and the former director of the U.S. Department of Defense's All-domain Anomaly Resolution Office, stated there was nothing unexpected in the release.

==== Skeptics ====
New York Post video editor Steven Greenstreet said some of the contents from the first round release of UFO files had been in the public record for years already and claimed they were discredited as possible camera artifacts while disputing any value of the releases. Writer Jason Colavito said that "most of the UFO material released ... had been made public decades ago." Writer Mick West stated there was "nothing really interesting" in the first release.

==== Religious perspectives ====
Multiple Christian pastors claimed that U.S. intelligence officials have held a series of meetings with them and told them to prepare churches to hold the Christian community together following the release of the files.

Two days before the first batch of files was released, evangelist pastor Perry Stone said that the UFO files could include reports of extraterrestrial aircraft and could even include video footage. Stone also warned that the UFO files "could shatter Christian faith."

== Second release ==
=== Prior to second release ===
Four UFO formations were recorded over water in Iran.

Tim Burchett, a supporter of the disclosure movement, said in an X (formerly Twitter) post that "The 1st drop will be big, but in comparison to what is coming, they will be a drop in the bucket." Burchett also said that "I would say ‘Holy Crap’ is coming."

Chief Pentagon spokesperson Sean Parnell announced on May 18, 2026, in a social media post that more documents are "actively being processed for publication" and says that there will be "more to come very soon." The second set of documents were released on May 22.

=== Second release ===
The second release of the "UFO files" was on May 22, 2026, following the first release, which received mixed reactions from the public. The new release of materials includes 222 new documents, including about 51 audio recordings and over 40 videos requested by lawmakers; one of the videos showed a UFO being shot down. It also included testimonies from civilians and military members.

A notable video from the 222 files showed a video of four UFOs in formation near Iran in 2022. The video was reportedly captured by U.S. military infrared systems. Officials did not identify the objects publicly. It was reported that "green fireballs" or "green orbs" were flying around during a Apollo 12 space mission.

== Third release ==
The third release of "UFO files" was on June 12, 2026; it included 53 documents, 10 images, 6 videos, and 3 audio recordings from the CIA, the FBI, NASA, and the Pentagon. The Pentagon said the archive includes 209 sightings of "green orbs," “discs," and "fireballs" reported close to a military facility. The third batch also included a report dated June 5, 2026, by Dr. Jon Kosloski, who is the director of AARO, that detailed an orange "mother orb" that was seen launching smaller red orbs. The "green orb" also called the green fireballs also raised questions about the 1949 UFO sightings in New Mexico.

Pete Hegseth said that "The Department of War is in lockstep with President Trump to bring unprecedented transparency regarding our government's understanding of Unidentified Anomalous Phenomena (UAP)." He also said that the files "long fueled justified speculation" and said the administration wanted Americans to "see it for themselves."

The report also said that 40% of reported phenomena lack reasonable explanation and remain unresolved. There is also a 2022 report of five US soldiers who reported seeing a white potato-shaped object over Cheyenne Mountain Complex in Colorado Springs. There is also a confession from the CIA in 1992 that they could not reveal to letter writers the true cause of UFO sightings going back to the 1950s, and that Project Blue Book had given the public false explanations. There are also reports dating back to the Roswell incident of June 4 – July 10, 1947.

== Fourth release ==
The fourth release of files was on July 10, 2026. A total of 40 files were included: 14 documents, 19 videos, 4 audio files and 3 images; most of the files came from NASA, the Pentagon, the CIA, FBI and the United States Department of Energy. A military aviator said he saw an object and stated that it was "unlike anything I've ever seen before in my 28 years of service." The Pentagon said they are already working on a fifth batch of files.

== Fifth release ==
The fifth release was on August 8, 2026. It contains 41 files from the Pentagon, the FBI, the CIA, the State Department, and the office of the President, from 1950 to 2026. The bulk of the files are grainy videos as in previous releases. It includes eight FBI witness forms.

== Sixth release ==
The sixth release was on September 18, 2026. It contains 55 PDF files, 15 video files, and one audio file. The videos are mostly grainy images recorded by military cameras. One of the videos is a copy of a film made in July 1952 at Tremonton, Utah. The Robertson Panel examined it in 1953 and determined that it most likely showed a group of birds.

== Seventh release ==
The seventh release was on October 23, 2026. It contains 28 PDF files. It includes Walter Haut's 2002 eyewitness account of the Roswell incident in 1947.

== Eighth release ==
The eighth release was on November 20, 2026.

== Release bundles ==
The following table lists UFO file release bundles published by the U.S. Department of Defense through the PURSUE portal, including release dates, downloadable document and video archives, and notes on their contents.

Release	Date cleared for release	Document bundle	Video bundle	Notes
Release 01	May 8, 2026	1.2 GB	1.3 GB	Historical records, modern mission reports, range fouler reports, correspondence, imagery, and video files
Release 02	May 22, 2026	70.1 MB	5.6 GB	Includes CIA, DOE, DOW, and ODNI materials
Release 03	June 12, 2026	826 MB	4.6 GB	Includes CIA, FBI, NASA, DOW, ICA, and USG materials
Release 04	July 10, 2026	227 MB	1.4 GB	Includes historical intelligence records, range fouler debriefs, NASA imagery, and contemporary military video files
Release 05	August 7, 2026	127 MB	1.3 GB	
Release 06	September 18, 2026			
Release 07	October 23, 2026			
Release 08	November 20, 2026			

== See also ==
- Advanced Aerospace Threat Identification Program – U.S. program to study UFOs (2007–2012)
- List of investigations of UFOs by governments – List of known UFO investigations performed by governments around the globe
- List of reported UFO sightings in the United States – List of alleged UFO sightings
- NASA Unidentified Anomalous Phenomena Independent Study Team – Panel to study unidentified anomalous phenomena
- National Defense Authorization Act for Fiscal Year 2024 – United States federal law
- UFO Report (U.S. Intelligence) – 2021 report from the Office of the Director of National Intelligence
