= List of investigations of UFOs by governments =

List of known UFO investigations performed by governments around the globe

This is a list of government-sponsored investigations or reports related to UFOs.

== Brazil ==
- Operação Prato

== Canada ==
- Project Magnet
- Project Second Storey

== France ==
- GEPAN / SEPRA / GEIPAN

== Soviet Union ==
- Institute 22

== United Kingdom ==
- Flying Saucer Working Party
- Project Condign

== United States ==
- Advanced Aerospace Threat Identification Program
- Roswell UFO incident
- Brookings Report
- Condon Committee
- Estimate of the Situation
- Project Blue Book
- Project Grudge
- Project Serpo
- Project Sign
- Project Silver Bug
- Robertson Panel
- All-domain Anomaly Resolution Office (AARO)
- NASA's UAP independent study team
- Unidentified Anomalous Phenomena Disclosure Act

== Uruguay ==
- Uruguayan Air Force Commission for the Reception and Investigation of Complaints of Unidentified Flying Objects (CRIDOVNI)
