= NASA Director of UAP Research =

NASA office to investigate UFOs

Director of Unidentified Anomalous Phenomena Research
- Incumbent; Mark McInerney
- NASA
- Formation: September 14, 2023

The Director of Unidentified Anomalous Phenomena Research at the National Aeronautics and Space Administration (NASA) oversees the investigation of unidentified flying objects (UFOs).

== Background ==
The Administrator of NASA, Bill Nelson, announced the creation of the position on September 14, 2023. It was created upon the recommendation of NASA's UAP independent study team. Nelson stated that the identity of the person who holds this position would be kept secret to prevent harassment. However, hours later, NASA announced that the position would be held by Mark McInerney.

The need for research into unidentified anomalous phenomena originates from national security concerns post-WWII, the expansion of adversarial technology as a consequence of the Space Race, and growing interests from the international community.

== See also ==
- All-domain Anomaly Resolution Office
- NASA's UAP independent study team
- UFO Report (U.S. Intelligence)
