= Mark McInerney =

Former NASA Director of UAP Research (2023-2025)

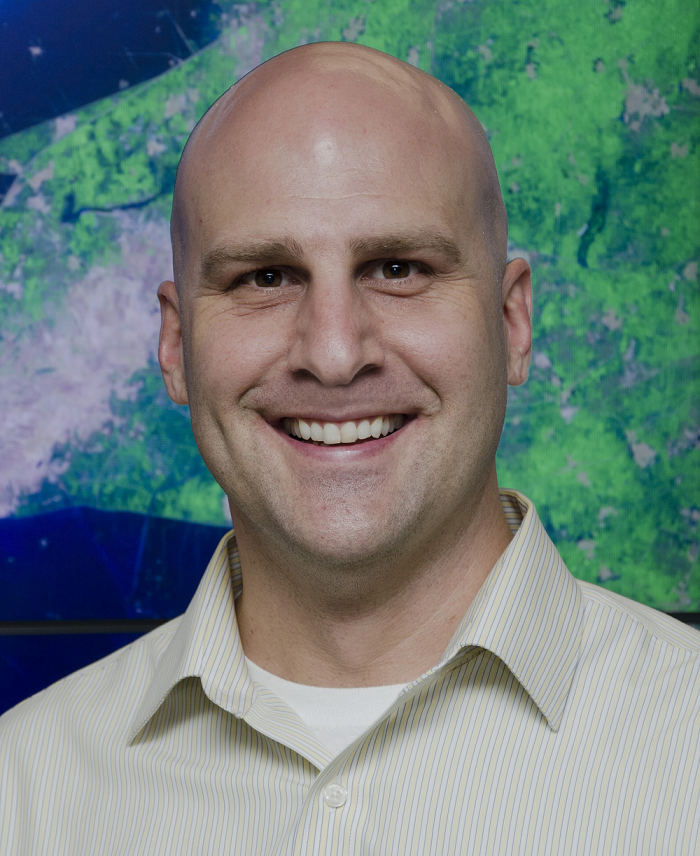
- Mark McInerney
- Education: WashU At Brookings (Public Leadership); Grand Valley State University (MS - Software Engineering & Computing); Central Michigan University (BS - Meteorology)
- Known for: NASA Director of UAP Research
- Awards: National Weather Service – Highest Award (2003)
- Scientific career
- Fields: Climatology; Meteorology; U.A.P.
- Workplaces: NASA; NOAA

Mark A. McInerney is an American meteorologist and climate data scientist. He was the NASA Director of UAP Research until July 2025.

== Education and career ==
McInerney studied meteorology at Central Michigan University, where he received his B.S. He went on to obtain an M.S. in software engineering and distributed computing at Grand Valley State University. In 1994, McInerney joined the National Weather Service at National Oceanic and Atmospheric Administration, where he worked at multiple locations, including the National Hurricane Center. He gained the highest honor of the National Weather Service in 2003.

McInerney moved to NASA's Goddard Space Flight Center in 2010, where he worked until spring 2023. During this time, he coordinated the technical strategies of the Earth Observing System Data and Information System, including data management in the climate data analytics system. Later in 2023, McInerney took on the position as the first NASA Director of UAP Research.
