= Consolidated Appropriations Act, 2022 =

Spending legislation in the United States

- Long title: An act making consolidated appropriations for the fiscal year ending September 30, 2022, and for providing emergency assistance for the situation in Ukraine, and for other purposes.
- Enacted by: the 117th United States Congress
- Effective: March 15, 2022

Citations
- Public law: Pub. L. 117–103 (text) (PDF)
- Statutes at Large: 136 Stat. 49

Legislative history
- Introduced in the House as H.R. 2471 (Haiti Development, Accountability, and Institutional Transparency Initiative Act) by Hakeem Jeffries (D-NY) on April 13, 2021; Committee consideration by United States House Committee on Foreign Affairs; Passed the House on June 29, 2021; Passed the Senate on January 13, 2022 (voice vote) with amendment; House agreed to Senate amendment on March 9, 2022 (361–69 and 260–171–1 as the Consolidated Appropriations Act, 2022) with further amendment; Senate agreed to House amendment on March 10, 2022 (68–31); Signed into law by President Joe Biden on March 15, 2022

Consolidated Appropriations Act, 2022 is a $1.5 trillion omnibus spending bill passed by the 117th United States Congress on March 14, 2022, and signed into law by President Joe Biden the following day.

The law includes $13.6 billion in aid to Ukraine as part of the United States' response to the 2022 Russian invasion of Ukraine.

== Negotiations ==
One important point of debate for the bill involved how much defense versus non-defense spending would be increased; Republican "leaders demanded equal levels of growth in the two areas." Compared to FY2021, the final bill raised defense spending by 5.6% to $782 billion, and other discretionary funding by 6.7% to $730 billion.

Due to lack of agreement on how much to grant out of the $22.5 billion requested for the ongoing COVID-19 pandemic in the United States, all funding in that area was dropped to allow the bill to pass quickly. The government said this endangered COVID-related testing, treatment, vaccination, international vaccine distribution, and preparedness for future COVID variants.

== Contents ==
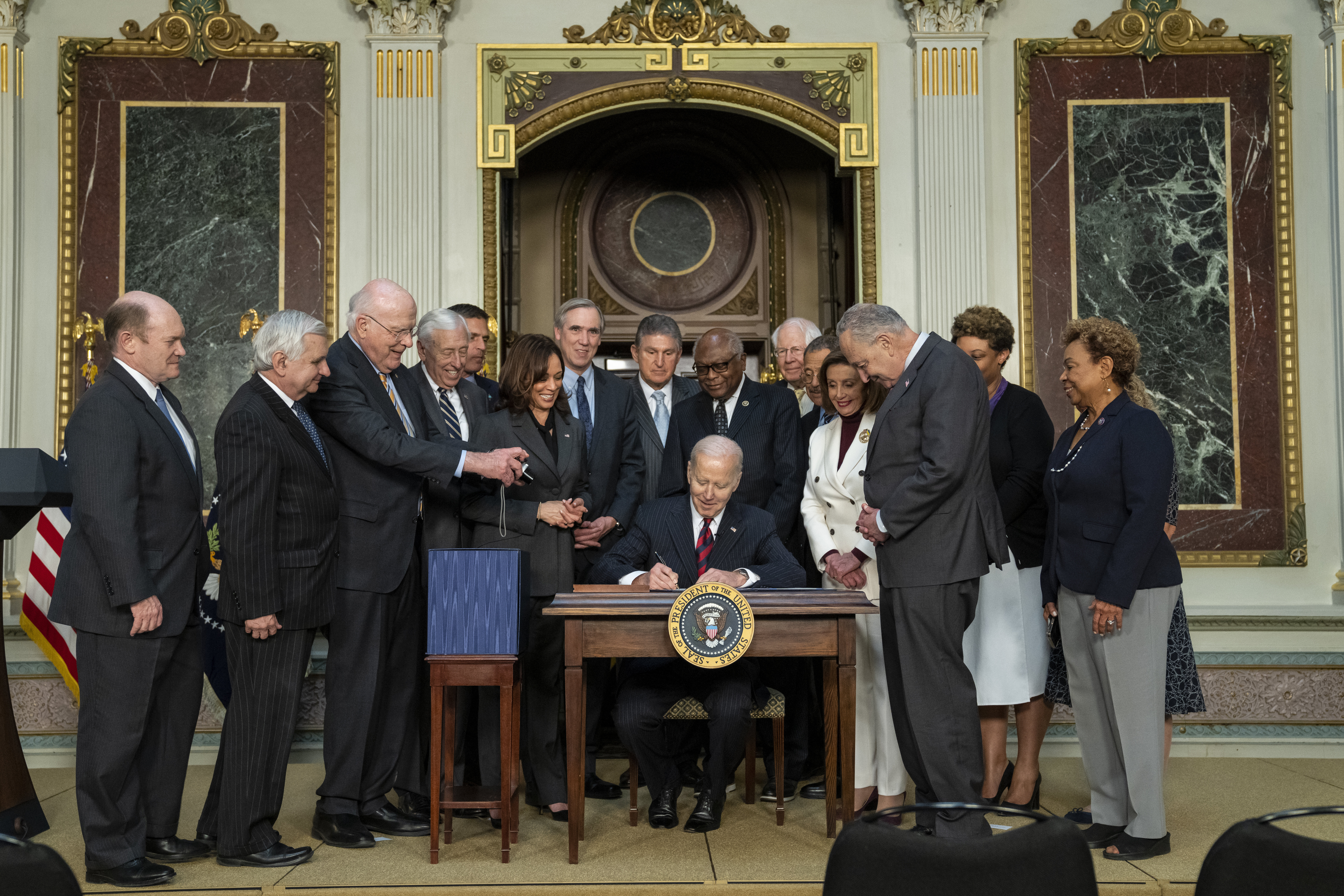
President Joe Biden signs the Consolidated Appropriations Act of 2022 in the Indian Treaty Room of the Eisenhower Executive Office Building on March 15, 2022.

The bill includes a reauthorization of the Violence Against Women Act, which had lapsed in 2019.

The bill "includes a ban on the use of any maps by the U.S. Department of State and its foreign operations that 'inaccurately' depict Taiwan as part of China."

The bill establishes the Advanced Research Projects Agency for Health within the Office of the United States Secretary of Health and Human Services and appropriates an initial $1 billion.

The bill amends the definition of the term "tobacco product" under the Family Smoking Prevention and Tobacco Control Act to define a tobacco product as "any product made or derived from tobacco or containing nicotine from any source, that is intended for human consumption", making electronic vapor products that contain synthetic nicotine subject to Food and Drug Administration (FDA) regulation. The law becomes effective on April 14, 2022, and manufacturers will have until May 14, 2022, to either submit a premarket tobacco product application (PMTA) to the FDA for each of their electronic vapor products that contain synthetic nicotine or stop marketing those products in the marketplace. Manufacturers that do submit a PMTA to the FDA by the May 14, 2022, deadline can continue marketing their products until July 13, 2022, after which time the products must be removed from retail stores unless the FDA has issued a PMTA marketing authorization order by the July 13, 2022, deadline date.

The bill also includes $4.5 million to fund the White House internship program, resulting in White House interns being paid for the first time. This was done following years of controversy surrounding the issue.

50 U.S.C. § 3373a built upon the earlier § 3373 (2022 NDAA) concerning reporting to and reporting from the Unidentified Aerial Phenomena Task Force, requiring quarterly classified reporting to Congress beginning no later than 13 June 2022. In July 2022, the All-domain Anomaly Resolution Office (AARO) was (re-)established. Language on the topic of UAP was also previously included in an accompanying Senate Select Committee on Intelligence report for the Intelligence Authorization Act for Fiscal Year 2021 (i.e. S. Rept. 116-233).
