= National Defense Authorization Act for Fiscal Year 2022 =

United States federal law

- Long title: To authorize appropriations for fiscal year 2022 for military activities of the Department of Defense, for military construction, and for defense activities of the Department of Energy, to prescribe military personnel strengths for such fiscal year, and for other purposes.
- Acronyms (colloquial): NDAA
- Enacted by: the 117th United States Congress

Citations
- Public law: Pub. L. 117–81 (text) (PDF)

Legislative history
- Introduced in the Senate as S. 1605 by Rick Scott (R–FL) on May 13, 2021; Committee consideration by Senate Energy and Natural Resources; Passed the Senate on June 9, 2021 (unanimous consent); Passed the House on December 7, 2021 (363–70) with amendment; Senate agreed to House amendment on December 15, 2021 (88–11); Signed into law by President Joe Biden on December 27, 2021

The National Defense Authorization Act for Fiscal Year 2022 (S. 1605; NDAA 2022, Pub.L. 117-81) is a United States federal law which specifies the budget, expenditures and policies of the U.S. Department of Defense (DOD) for fiscal year 2022. Analogous NDAAs have been passed annually for 60 years.

== History ==
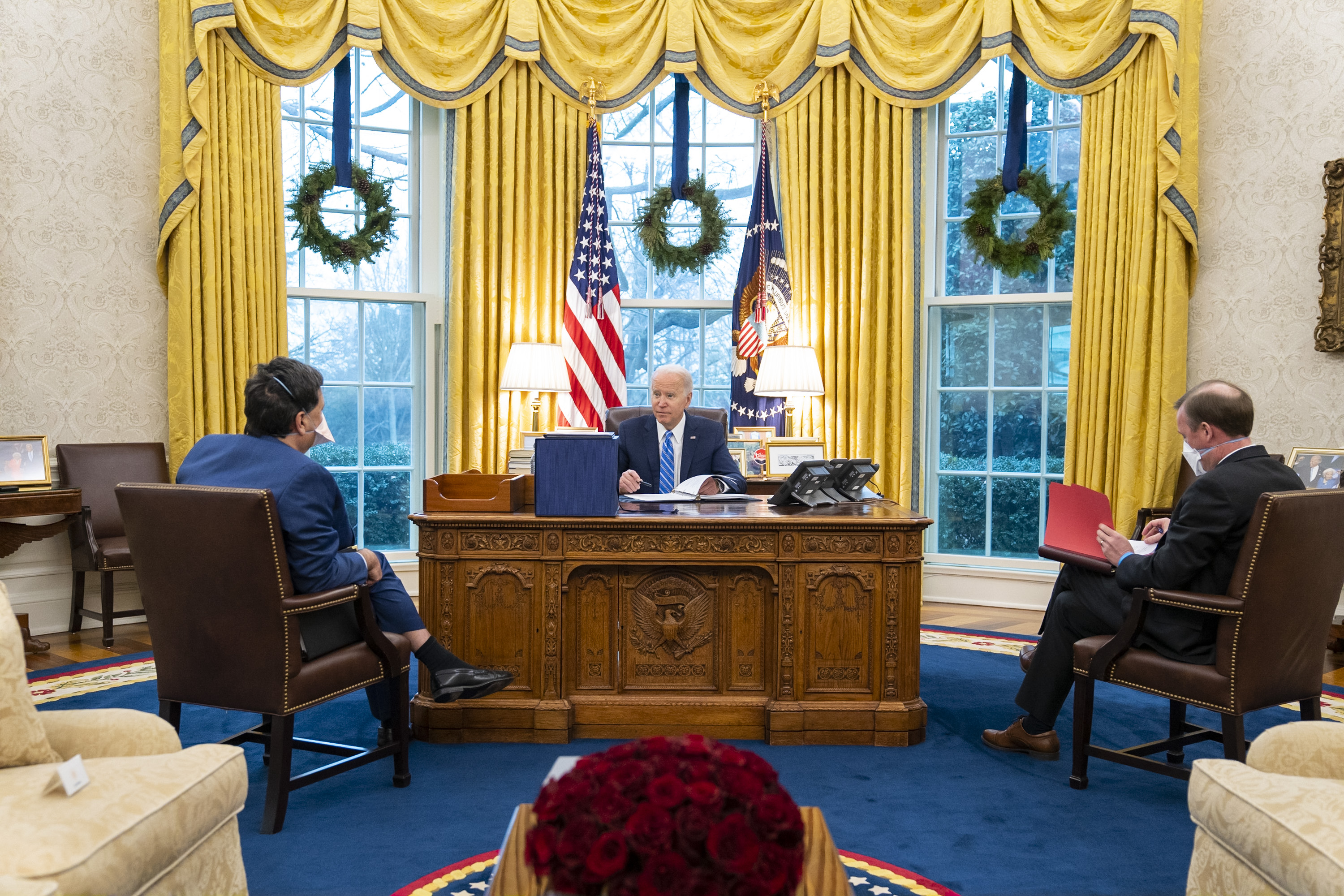
President Joe Biden signs the NDAA in the Oval Office of the White House on December 27, 2021

The House of Representatives bill H.R. 4350 was introduced on July 2, 2021, by Rep. Adam Smith of Washington state, the chair of the House Armed Services Committee. Markup began on July 28. 780 amendments were made during markup, which ended on August 31. A corresponding Senate bill, S. 2792, was introduced on September 22.

The House approved their version of the bill in a 316 to 113 vote on September 23. It included a provision that women, like men, should be required to register for Selective Service. However, this was later removed from the final bill.

The Senate approved to move forward and consider the House's version of the NDAA instead of theirs on November 17, by a 84 to 15 vote. Conflict in the Senate led the version of the bill introduced in the Senate to be placed on hold, due to objections by Senator Marco Rubio over the attached amendment package. A compromise bill was created through a previously introduced Senate bill, S. 1605 on December 7, and the House passed it on the same day with bipartisan support, which removed some of the provisions in the Senate version of the NDAA bill. On December 15, the compromise bill was passed by the Senate in a 88–11 vote.

President Joe Biden signed the NDAA 2022 into law on December 27, 2021. In his signing statement, Biden expressed reservations about restrictions on transferring Guantánamo Bay detainees, potential infringements on the President's authority to protect sensitive national security information, and the constitutionality of Senate confirmation for certain executive branch working group members.

== Provisions ==
Section 1683 (50 U.S.C. § 3373) directs the Secretary and Director of National Intelligence to establish an office to carry out the duties of the Unidentified Aerial Phenomena Task Force (UAPTF). In July 2022 the All-domain Anomaly Resolution Office (AARO) was (re-)established to meet those requirements. This section was later amended by the 2023 NDAA. Language on the topic of UAP was also included in the subsequent Intelligence Authorization Act for Fiscal Year 2022 (i.e. 50 U.S.C. § 3373a), as well as an accompanying Senate Select Committee on Intelligence report for the previous Intelligence Authorization Act for Fiscal Year 2021 (i.e. S. Rept. 116-233).

== See also ==
- National Defense Authorization Act
- Military budget of the United States
- 2021 in United States politics and government
