= Bryan Bender =

American journalist and editor (born 1972)

Bryan Bender (born May 18, 1972) is a communications executive and former award-winning national security reporter and editor who advises tech companies, nonprofits and research universities for SMI, a Washington, DC, government affairs firm, and is an adjunct professor at the Walter Cronkite School of Journalism and Mass Communication at Arizona State University.

He is former senior national correspondent and defense editor for POLITICO, where he authored the Morning Defense newsletter and edited POLITICO Space.

He previously served as the Pentagon correspondent for The Boston Globe and Washington Bureau Chief for Jane’s Defence Weekly.

Bender has covered U.S. military and diplomatic operations in the Middle East, Europe, Asia, and Latin America, including the wars in Afghanistan and Iraq, and has reported on a range of topics such as domestic and international terrorism; the international arms trade; veterans affairs; military training; nuclear arms control; the anti-war movement; the nexus between climate change and national security; government secrecy; and newly declassified government files on Cuba, Vietnam, the Kennedy Administration, and unidentified anomalous phenomena, or UAP.

He is author You Are Not Forgotten, the story of an Iraq War veteran’s search for a missing World War II fighter pilot in the jungles of New Guinea. He has also extensively covered the U.S. military ongoing search for missing personnel from past conflicts.

Bender is researching a book on the early political careers of John F. Kennedy and Richard Nixon in the House of Representatives.

== Personal background ==
Bender is a native of Wilkes-Barre, Pennsylvania, and attended the United Hebrew Institute in Kingston and Wyoming Valley West High School in Plymouth. He earned undergraduate degrees in Political Science and English Writing from the University of Pittsburgh.

== Professional background ==
In 1998, Bender was named the Washington bureau chief for Jane's Defence Weekly, a London-based magazine.

In 2007, Bender was a finalist for the Scripps Howard Foundation's Washington Reporting Award for an investigation into an Army cheating scandal.

In 2011, he was a finalist for the Gerald R. Loeb Award for Distinguished Business Reporting for a probe into the growing role of retired generals and admirals in defense companies and as private consultants.

In 2013, he was awarded the National Press Foundation's Everett Dirksen Award for Distinguished Reporting of Congress for an investigation of the growing role of think tanks in partisan politics.

In 2023, he was the recipient of the European Press Prize for Investigative Reporting for an investigation into a global teenage network of neo-Nazis in collaboration with the German newspaper Welt.

Bender serves as a member of the advisory board of Americans for Safe Aerospace, a non-profit advocacy organization led by military pilots that is dedicated to securing American aerospace and greater government transparency about UFOs.

He is also former president of Military Reporters and Editors Association, the professional association for journalists covering the U.S. military.

His work has also appeared in The New Republic, The New York Times, Los Angeles Times, Jane's Defence Weekly, among other publications. He is also frequent television and radio commentator on national security and foreign policy topics.
