= Institute 22 =

Secret organization in the Soviet Union

The Institute 22 organization was created in 1978, by the Academy of Sciences and the Ministry of Defense in the Soviet Union. Its mission was to investigate UFOs in the Soviet Union. Institute 22 was a secret organization for 13 years (until the fall of the Soviet Union), and can be compared to the American Project Blue Book.

During its existence a great number of soldiers, sailors and pilots of the Soviet Army were given orders to watch for UFOs and other unexplained events, without any further information. The orders could be handed out quite easily since the Ministry of Defense was involved – thus no questions could be asked.

Institute 22 have investigated around 3000 UFO reports. About 5-10% of all cases remained unexplained when the organization dissolved.

There is a conspiracy theory that Institute 22 was involved in a cover-up of a near-nuclear launch. In 1982, one of the Soviet Nuclear Bases was brought online, and for no apparent reason a nuclear missile was ready to launch. After 30 seconds of panic and chaos, the launch was aborted as mysteriously as it had appeared. Later, witnesses said that there had been some UFO activity near the area of the base – thus the reason for Institute 22's involvement and cover-up. The UFOs were explained as flares, which the Army was testing from a higher altitude. The nuclear crisis was explained as a simple test.
