= All-domain Anomaly Resolution Office =

Task force of the US Department of Defense

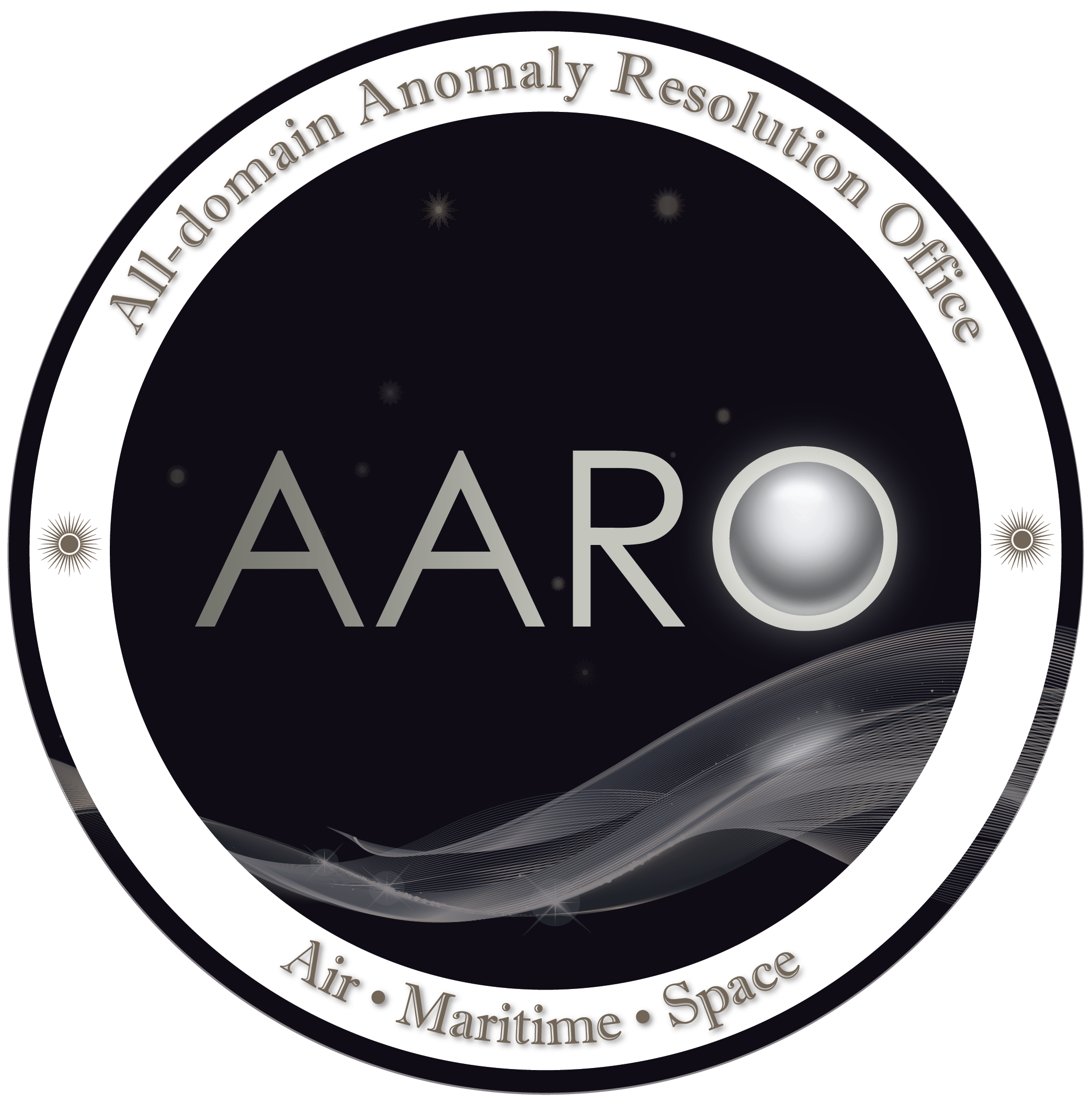
- Logo for the All-domain Anomaly Resolution Office of the U.S. Defense Department

Office overview
- Formed: July 20, 2022
- Preceding agencies: Advanced Aerospace Threat Identification Program (AATIP); Unidentified Aerial Phenomena Task Force (UAPTF); Airborne Object Identification and Management Synchronization Group (AOIMSG)
- Office executive: Jon T. Kosloski, Director
- Parent office: United States Deputy Secretary of Defense
- Key document: 50 U.S.C. § 3373
- Website: www.aaro.mil

The All-domain Anomaly Resolution Office (AARO) is an office within the United States Office of the Secretary of Defense that investigates unidentified flying objects (UFOs) and other phenomena in the air, sea, and/or space and/or on land: sometimes referred to as "unidentified aerial phenomena" or "unidentified anomalous phenomena" (UAP). Its first director was physicist Sean Kirkpatrick who reported to then deputy defense secretary Kathleen Hicks. Its current director is Jon T. Kosloski.

Established in 2022, AARO was preceded by the Unidentified Aerial Phenomena Task Force (UAPTF), a 2020 to 2021 program within the Office of Naval Intelligence used to "standardize collection and reporting" of sightings of UFOs. UAPTF was detailed in a June 2020 hearing of the United States Senate Select Committee on Intelligence. The UAPTF issued a preliminary report in June 2021. NASA's UAP independent study team held a public meeting in June 2023 showing further UAP footage released by AARO. In March 2024, AARO released a report titled "Report on the Historical Record of U.S. Government Involvement with Unidentified Anomalous Phenomena (UAP) Volume I", which found "no empirical evidence" of alien technology.

== History ==
The AARO is the successor of a number of 21st century US Department of Defense (DoD) initiatives funded by Congress to study UFOs.

=== AATIP (2007–2012) ===
In 2007, the United States Defense Intelligence Agency set up an unclassified but low-profile program titled the Advanced Aerospace Threat Identification Program (AATIP). This was in response to several reports of unidentified craft identified by the US military. The program was closed in 2012, following its cessation of funding, and the Navy and Intelligence Services continued its work.

=== UAPTF (2017–2021) ===
In December 2017, the United States Department of Defense confirmed the existence of a defense program used to collect data on military UFO sightings, despite the disbandment of the Advanced Aerospace Threat Identification Program in 2012. Like its predecessor program, the UAP Task Force is managed by the under secretary of defense for intelligence in collaboration with the Office of Naval Intelligence.

After the June 2020 Senate hearing, Senator Marco Rubio requested the release of video footage of unexplained aerial vehicles collected by the United States Navy, including the Pentagon UFO videos stating that he was worried that an adversary country had achieved "some technological leap" that "allows them to conduct this sort of activity", while also saying that there might be a conventional explanation that was "boring".

On June 24, 2020, the Intelligence Committee voted to require United States Intelligence Community and the United States Department of Defense to publicly track and analyze data collected on unexplained aerial vehicles. A report from the task force will be issued to the Intelligence Committee 180 days after the passage of the intelligence authorization act.

The program was officially approved on August 4, 2020, by the deputy secretary of defense David Norquist and announced on August 14, 2020. "The mission of the task force is to detect, analyze and catalog UAPs that could potentially pose a threat to U.S. national security."

Brennan McKernan was the director of the UAPTF.

On April 12, 2021, the Pentagon confirmed the authenticity of pictures and videos gathered by the Task Force, purportedly showing "what appears to be pyramid-shaped objects" hovering above USS Russell in 2019, off the coast of California, with spokeswoman Susan Gough saying "I can confirm that the referenced photos and videos were taken by United States Navy personnel. The UAPTF has included these incidents in their ongoing examinations." Science writer Mick West has proposed that the pyramid images in the USS Russell video were an airplane, Jupiter, and stars that were distorted when the lens was out of focus. West identified similarities in the Navy video to a photographic effect called bokeh, and demonstrated the effect by recreating similar pyramid images on video.

The following month, Gough further confirmed a second video had been recorded by Navy personnel and was under review by the Task Force. The video, recorded on July 15, 2019, in the combat information center of USS Omaha, purportedly shows a spherical object flying over the ocean as seen through an infrared (IR) camera at night, moving across the screen before appearing to stop and ease below water level.

On June 25, 2021, the Office of the Director of National Intelligence released a report on UAPs, commonly known as the Pentagon UFO Report. The report found that the UAPTF was unable to identify 143 of 144 objects spotted between 2004 and 2021. The report said that 18 featured unusual movement patterns or flight characteristics, and more analysis was needed to determine if those sightings represented breakthrough technology. The report noted that some of those steps were resource-intensive and required additional investment. The report did not link the sightings to extraterrestrial life, with officials saying, "We have no clear indications that there is any nonterrestrial explanation for them — but we will go wherever the data takes us".

=== AOIMSG (2021–2022) ===
The successor to the UAPTF was established on November 23, 2021, as the Airborne Object Identification and Management Synchronization Group (AOIMSG). Oversight and direction of the AOIMSG was to be an Executive Council, formerly the Airborne Object Identification and Management Executive Council (AOIMEXEC). The AOIMEXEC was to be co-chaired by the Under Secretary of Defense for Intelligence and Security (USD(I&S)) and the Director of Operations, Joint Staff, and was to designate an acting director for the AOIMSG. In July 2022, DoD announced the successors to AOIMSG and AOIMEXEC to be AARO and AAROEXEC (AARO's Executive Council), respectively, the foundings of which were aided by Senator Kirsten Gillibrand. The UAPTF was disestablished, with its resources transferred to AOIMSG. 50 U.S.C. § 3373a (IAA 2022) requires quarterly classified reporting to Congress beginning no later than June 2022.

=== AARO (2022–present) ===
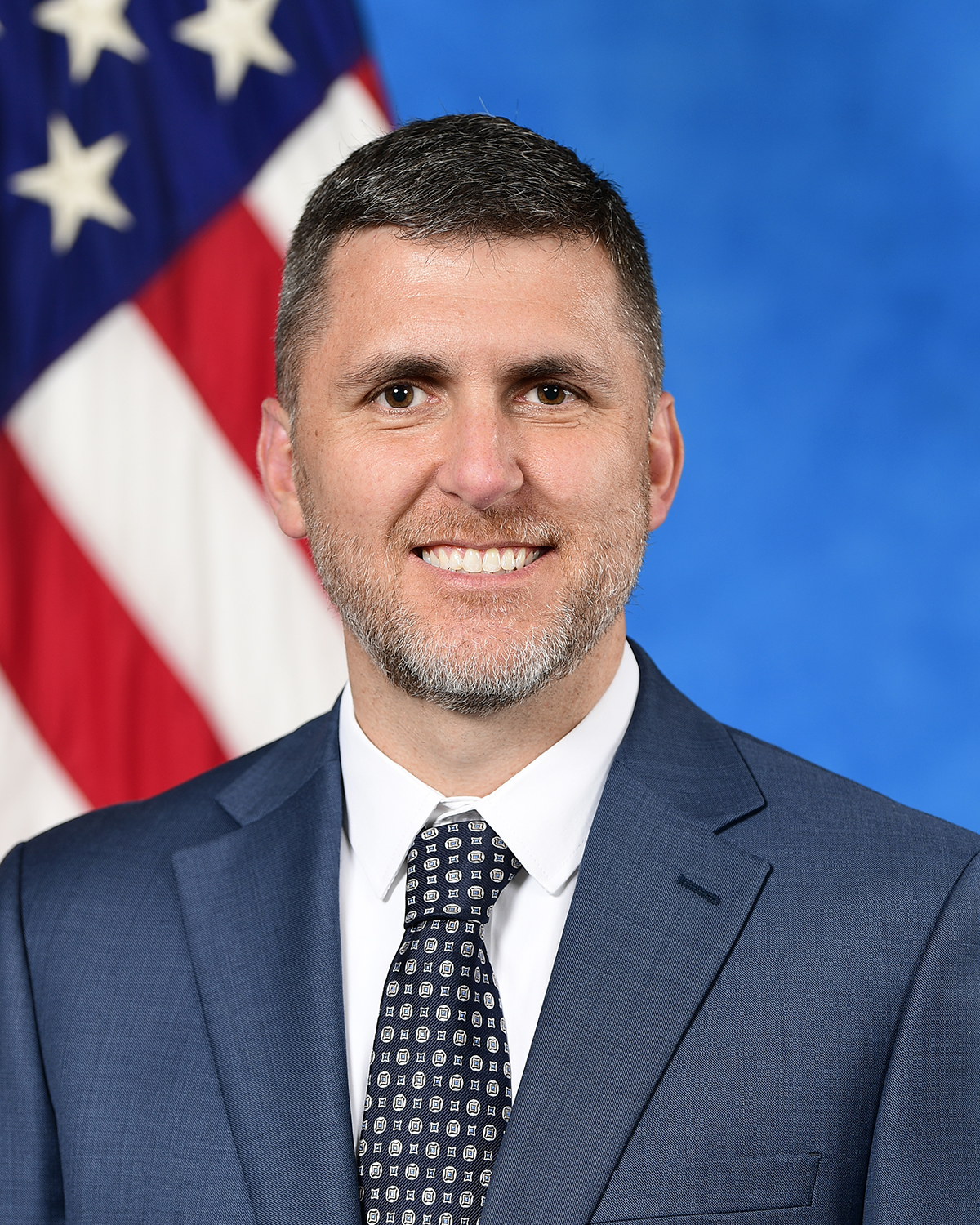
Director Jon T. Kosloski, 2024

50 U.S.C. § 3373 (NDAA 2022 and NDAA 2023) directs the Secretary and DNI to establish an office to carry out the duties of the UAPTF. In July 2022, DoD created the All-domain Anomaly Resolution Office (AARO) to carry out the duties that were to be fulfilled by the AOIMSG.

On August 30, 2023, the AARO's public website was launched, without an email address or phone number for military and civilian UAP reports, as previously mandated by NDAA legislation.

On November 7, 2023, it was reported that Sean M. Kirkpatrick would step down as director of AARO, effective December 2023. Timothy A. Phillips, on assignment from the Office of the Director of National Intelligence, became the Deputy Director. Sean Kirkpatrick left the position of AARO Director on 1 December 2023.

On August 26, 2024, Jon T. Kosloski was named the director of AARO, replacing acting director Timothy Phillips. Kosloski in 2026 stated there "should be no stigma associated with reporting UAP; reporting is in the national security interest."

== Organization and remit ==
AARO's Executive Council is AAROEXEC. Its director reports to Deputy Defense Secretary.

AARO focuses on

1. Surveillance, Collection and Recording
2. System Capabilities and Design
3. Intelligence Operations and Analysis
4. Mitigation and Defeat
5. Governance
6. Science and Technology

AARO continues the collection and reporting of Unidentified Aerial Phenomena (UAP) incidents across the DoD's special use airspace (SUA), as well as the collection and reporting of anomalous, unidentified space, airborne, submerged, and transmedia objects. AARO is to identify and reduce gaps in operational, intelligence, and counterintelligence capability and to recommend policy changes, whether regulatory or statutory, to reduce those gaps.

The organization also aims to increase communication between the military and IC over unidentified marine and aerial craft that could threaten U.S. forces and military bases or spy on sensitive facilities.

The establishing legislation empowers the office to review records as far back as 1945 to determine if federal government or contractor UFO programs were in existence that may have shielded information from either the White House or the US Congress.

Resourcing for AARO will be visible at the Program Budget Review process (PBR); USD(I&S) also invites the participation of Principals from the Office of the Director of National Intelligence.

== Reports ==
=== 2022 joint ODNI report ===
The office and ODNI released an 11-page unclassified report on January 12, 2022, prompted by a law that says ODNI must submit a report to Congress yearly. The report covered 247 new UAP sightings going back to March 2021, as well as 119 events before that date that had not been previously examined. The report indicated that there had been "510 UAP reports as of 30 August 2022", which was an increase on the previous number of encounters referred to the office. The report indicated there had been no evidence of aliens.

The report noted that out of the 366 new reports submitted, after initial analysis, about half were found to have common explanations, e.g., uncrewed aircraft, balloons, and clutter. The report indicated that there should be assumptions made about multiple factors that could affect observations of UAPs, including illumination, weather and the accuracy of the interpretation of sensor data, and that a select number of reports submitted may relate to irregularities of the operator or the equipment.

Out of the 366 reports, 171 remained uncharacterized. The report noted that some of these uncharacterized UAPs appear to have demonstrated unusual flight characteristics or performance capabilities and that these reported incidents required further analysis.

Input for the report was sought or supplied from various bodies, including NASA, the Federal Aviation Administration, the National Oceanographic and Atmospheric Administration, and the Department of Energy. The report notes that most of the sightings were made to the office by U.S. Navy and U.S. Air Force personnel, reporting them through their official channels. The report also noted that some of the cases could be as a result of sensors not working correctly.

=== 2024 report ===
Report on the Historical Record of U.S. Government Involvement with Unidentified Anomalous Phenomena (UAP) Volume 1

On March 6, 2024, the DOD cleared for publication the AARO "Report on the Historical Record of U.S. Government Involvement with Unidentified Anomalous Phenomena (UAP) Volume 1", which according to the Washington Post, "covered all official U.S. investigatory efforts from 1945 to the present and examined classified and unclassified government archives."

The report noted a “proliferation of television programmes, books, movies, and the vast amount of internet and social media content centred on UAP-related topics“ but concluded that official investigations had not found any empirical evidence that reported sightings represented “off-world technology” or any classified program that had not been reported to Congress, hidden alien technology or extraterrestrial artifacts.

The report detailed 20th-century UAP investigations, including Projects Saucer, Sign, Grudge, Twinkle, and Blue Book; more recent investigations included AAWSAP, AATIP, UAPTF, and AARO itself. The report revealed for the first time that elements within the US government had proposed to create a Special Access Program under the Department of Homeland Security, to be named "Kona Blue", to reverse engineer any extraterrestrial craft that came into its possession. Advocates of the proposal "were convinced that the U.S. government was hiding UAP technologies", but DHS leaders rejected the proposal as "without merit"; AARO's report similarly rejected the claims of Kona Blue's advocates.

"FLIR" video, Nov 2004

"GIMBAL" video, Jan 2015

"GOFAST" video, Jan 2015

== Current AARO investigations ==
AARO has opened hundreds of investigations since its founding in 2022, many of which were from military personnel. Half of these have been resolved with mundane explanations, for instance, weather balloons. The other half remain unexplained, with insufficient data to reach any conclusion. In November 2024, AARO director Jon Kosloski stated that AARO is analyzing several "true anomalies" and that "there are interesting cases that I, with my physics and engineering background and time in the [intelligence community], I do not understand. And I don't know anybody else who understands them either."

== Reactions ==
In December 2022, Under Secretary of Defense for Intelligence and Security Ronald Moultrie said that "[w]e have not seen anything that would lead us [...] to believe that any of the objects we have seen are of alien origin," and that many of the reported objects may be "balloons and things like UAVs that are operated for purposes other than surveillance or intelligence collection."

Politico reported on August 10, 2023, that "AARO is required by law to launch a public-facing website where witnesses can directly report potential UFO sightings" but that this "website is tied up in Pentagon red tape". A public website was launched for AARO on August 31, 2023.

Writing for Politico, Bryan Bender quoted Christopher Mellon, former Deputy Assistant Secretary of Defense for Intelligence and an onetime advisor to the UFO disclosure movement-promoting company To the Stars, as saying "It further legitimizes the issue", adding "That in itself is extremely important. People can talk about it without fear of embarrassment." Mellon also said, "We are talking dozens of incidents in restricted military airspace over years."

In a piece originally published in Newsweek, astrophysicist Adam Frank wrote, "If it's handled well, the [UAP] commission could do more than shed much-needed light on UAPs. It could also give Americans a masterclass in the most basic, most important, and unfortunately, most boring topic in science: Standards of Evidence" and that "when it comes to UAPS/UFOs there are no such standards. It's just a free-for-all."

Journalist Keith Kloor criticized the involvement of reality TV personality Travis S. Taylor. Pentagon spokesperson Susan Gough confirmed to Kloor for an article on Science Insider, the online news section of the AAAS that Taylor had a leading role on the Unidentified Aerial Phenomena Task Force and was informally referred to as its chief scientist. Kloor characterized Taylor as "a researcher who believes in the supernatural". Kloor wrote, "Critics are simply astonished by what they call his antiscientific embrace of the supernatural — and the Pentagon's willingness to work with him". Skeptic and science writer Robert Sheaffer criticized Taylor's involvement, "I'm starting to see why [the government's] task force was so unsuccessful in identifying its UAPs!".

== See also ==
- NASA Director of UAP Research
