= Sean M. Kirkpatrick =

Physicist and intelligence officer

Sean Kirkpatrick
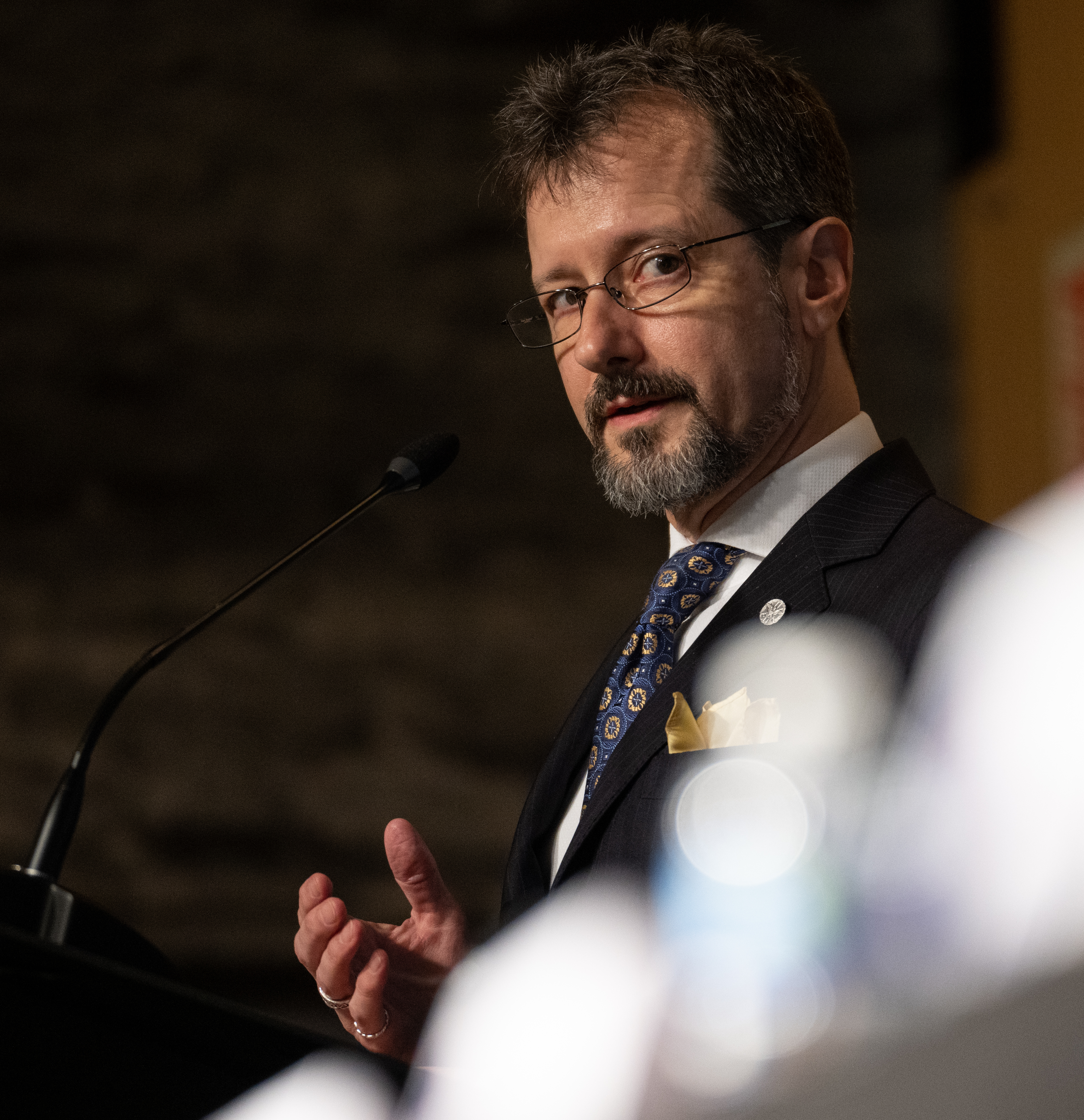

1st director of the All-Domain Anomaly Resolution Office
- In office July 20, 2022 – December 1, 2023
- President: Joe Biden
- Preceded by: Position established
- Succeeded by: Tim Phillips (acting)

Personal details
- Born: Sean Michael Kirkpatrick; 1967 or 1968 (age 57–58) Columbus, Georgia, U.S.
- Education: University of Georgia (BS, PhD)
- Scientific career
- Institutions: AFRL, CIA, DIA, USSC, University of Georgia, AARO
- Thesis: Experimental and Theoretical Investigation of Nonequilibrium Acoustic Phonon Dynamics in Praseodymium-Doped Fluorides (1995)
- Doctoral advisor: William Dennis

Sean Michael Kirkpatrick (born 1967/1968) is an American laser and materials physicist who served as the first director of the United States Department of Defense's All-domain Anomaly Resolution Office (AARO). Kirkpatrick is also an adjunct assistant professor of physics at the University of Georgia.

== Early life, education and doctoral career ==
Kirkpatrick was born in Columbus, Georgia, to an Army family and raised in Duluth, Georgia. In 1986, he was invited as a teenager to the inaugural High School Honors Research Program, sponsored by the United States Department of Energy, to study at Brookhaven National Laboratory. He studied physics at the University of Georgia, where he received his BS in 1991 and Ph.D. in 1995 under the supervision of William Dennis. His doctoral research was focused on nonlinear and nonequilibrium phonon dynamics of rare earth-doped fluoride crystals.

Kirkpatrick conducted postdoctoral research at the University of Illinois Urbana-Champaign and investigated laser-induced molecular vibrations for the Air Force Office of Scientific Research (AFOSR) in 1995. Next, Kirkpatrick worked for the United States Naval Research Laboratory through a National Research Council Fellowship from 1996 to 1997.

== Career ==
=== Intelligence work ===
In 1997, Kirkpatrick joined the Air Force Research Laboratory where he developed an ultrafast laser physics laboratory for Air Force applications. In 2003, he joined the Central Intelligence Agency, where he first served as a program manager assigned to the National Reconnaissance Office from 2003 to 2005, and then as a staff scientist for the Directorate of Science and Technology from 2005 to 2007. Kirkpatrick also served as a Chief Technology Officer and Division Chief for a Defense Intelligence Agency program office from 2007 to 2010, and as the Space Control Portfolio Manager for the Deputy Assistant Secretary of Defense for Strategic, Space, and Intelligence Portfolio Management from 2010 to 2012.

After being promoted to the Defense Intelligence Senior Executive Service in 2012, Kirkpatrick served as the Defense Intelligence Officer for Scientific and Technical Intelligence for the Defense Intelligence Agency until 2016. He then served as Deputy Director of Intelligence for United States Strategic Command from 2016 to 2017, Director of National Security Strategy for the National Security Council from 2017 to 2018, and as Deputy Director of Intelligence for United States Space Command from 2019 to 2021. Prior to his appointment as AARO's director in July 2022, Kirkpatrick served at the Defense Intelligence Agency's Missile and Space Intelligence Center in Huntsville, Alabama.

=== Director of AARO and work with UAPs ===
In March 2023, Kirkpatrick and Avi Loeb released a manuscript on the physical constraints of hypothetical alien spaceships existing in the Solar System. The unfinished draft by Kirkpatrick and Loeb included a consideration of the idea that UAPs, "which appear to defy all physics, could be 'probes' from an extraterrestrial 'parent craft'".

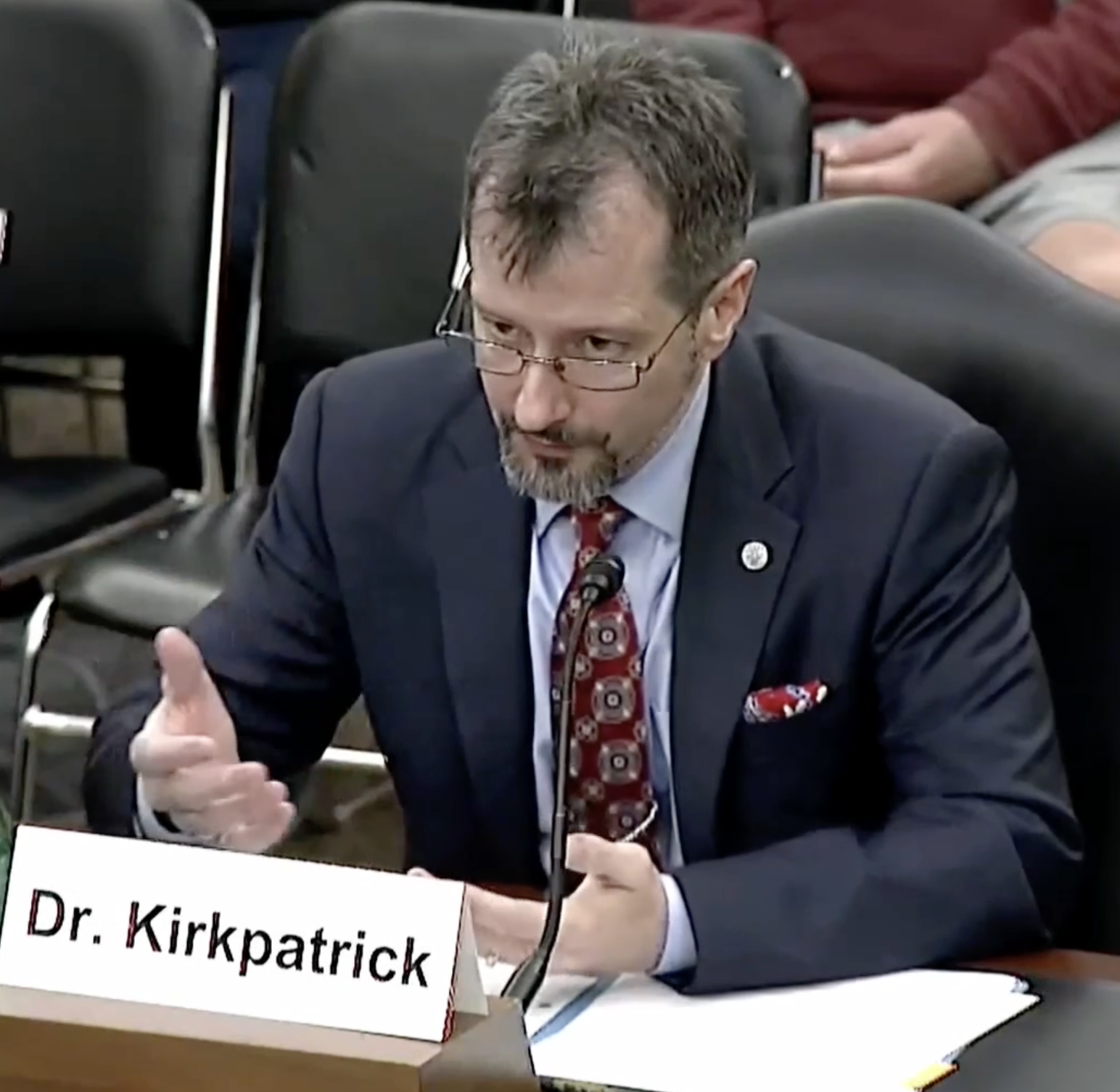
Kirkpatrick as sole witness before subcommittee hearing of the Senate Armed Services Committee on April 19, 2023 to testify about UAPs and his work as director of the All-domain Anomaly Resolution Office

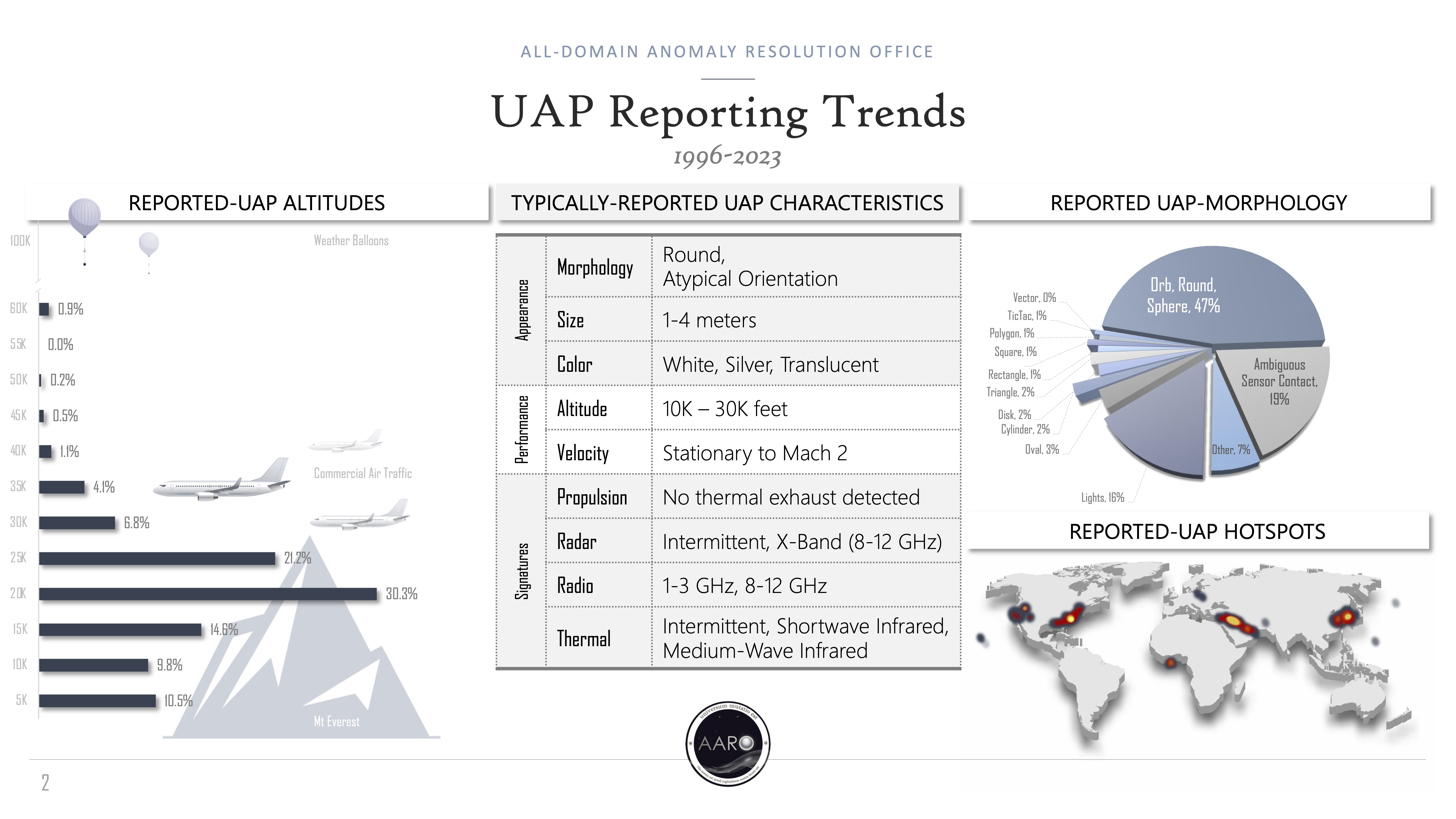
Slide from presentation by Sean Kirkpatrick, Director of AARO, on May 31, 2023 to NASA's UAP independent study team

Kirkpatrick testified on April 19, 2023 as sole witness before a subcommittee of the Senate Armed Services Committee in a hearing about UAPs chaired by Senator Kirsten Gillibrand (D-NY).

In the first public meeting of NASA's UAP independent study team on May 31, 2023, Kirkpatrick was invited to give the opening remarks. Kirkpatrick thanked NASA for bringing additional expertise to the task of UAP data collection and analysis. In answer to later questions, he noted that U.S. military personnel are observing "metallic orbs" in many locations "all over the world", that spherical objects account for the largest proportion — nearly half — of all UAP reports received by his office, and that some of these objects are capable of "very interesting apparent maneuvers".

Following the July 26, 2023 Congressional UAP hearing that included testimony from David Grusch, Kirkpatrick wrote that, "contrary to assertions made in the hearing", Grusch "has refused to speak with AARO" so that some details said to have been given to Congress had not been provided to his office and also that the hearing was "insulting ...to the officers of the Department of Defense and Intelligence Community who chose to join AARO, many with not unreasonable anxieties about the career risks this would entail".

In December, 2023, Kirkpatrick stepped down as the director of AARO. In December 2023, Kirkpatrick joined the Oak Ridge National Laboratory as the chief technology officer for defense and intelligence programs.

In January 2024, Kirkpatrick published an op-ed in Scientific American, stating that he had found no evidence of aliens as director of AARO, and that the allegations of a coverup of UFOs by the US government "derive from inadvertent or unauthorized disclosures of legitimate U.S. programs or related R&D that have nothing to do with extraterrestrial issues or technology. Some are misrepresentations, and some derive from pure, unsupported beliefs. In many respects, the narrative is a textbook example of circular reporting, with each person relaying what they heard, but the information often ultimately being sourced to the same small group of individuals," describing these individuals as “a small group of interconnected believers and others with possibly less than honest intentions” who promote a “whirlwind of tall tales, fabrication and secondhand or thirdhand retellings".

== Honors ==
In 2010, the University of Georgia Department of Physics and Astronomy created a Sean M. Kirkpatrick award for outstanding graduate research in his honor that is given annually to a graduate student for their research work.

== Patents ==
Kirkpatrick holds two public record United States patents:

1. Holographic recording and micro/nanofabrication via ultrafast holographic two-photon induced photopolymerization (H-TPIP), September 23, 2003; application filed by SAIC, current assignee: Leidos.
2. System and method for determining influence of channels in a social network, June 29, 2023; application filed by and assigned to Reveal Systems, Inc.
