= UFO Report (U.S. Intelligence) =

2021 report from the Office of the Director of National Intelligence

Preliminary Assessment: Unidentified Aerial Phenomena

Preliminary Assessment: Unidentified Aerial Phenomena, also known as the UAP Report and colloquially named the Pentagon UFO Report, is a United States federally mandated assessment, prepared and published by the Office of the Director of National Intelligence on June 25, 2021, summarizing information regarding unidentified aerial phenomena (UAPs) which include unidentified flying objects (UFOs). Substantial public attention had been given to the mandated June 25 report, fueled by statements by former high level officials in the U.S. government, including former president Barack Obama, who stated in June 2021 "...there's footage and records of objects in the skies, that we don't know exactly what they are."

The report was supposed to give "detailed analysis of unidentified aerial phenomena data and intelligence" that had been compiled by the Office of Naval Intelligence, the Unidentified Aerial Phenomena Task Force (UAPTF) and the FBI. The report identified national security and pilot safety concerns related with UAPs. U.S. Senator Marco Rubio, Vice Chairman of the Senate Intelligence Committee, stated that he had asked the Director of National Intelligence Avril Haines for additional information in advance of the report's release, terming his request a "pre-briefing." Rubio stated, regarding the nature of the unknown objects, "There's stuff flying in our airspace and we don't know who it is and it's not ours. So we should know who it is, especially if it's an adversary that's made a technological leap."

A reported 43% of the U.S. public are increasingly interested in the topic of UFOs in the wake of the initial release by The New York Times in December 2017 of the Pentagon UFO videos, with considerable additional serious U.S. media attention being paid to the Advanced Aerospace Threat Identification Program.

== Background ==
The Senate Intelligence Committee included in its Senate Report 116-233 accompanying the Intelligence Authorization Act for Fiscal Year 2021 a stipulation that mandated the Director of National Intelligence work with the Secretary of Defense on a report detailing what the government knows about Unidentified Aerial Phenomena (UAP), commonly known as UFOs, to be released to Congress in 180 days, meaning no further than June 25, 2021.

The provision demanded that the report include "detailed analysis of unidentified aerial phenomena data and intelligence" gathered by the Office of Naval Intelligence, the Unidentified Aerial Phenomena Task Force and the FBI. It further called for "a detailed description of an interagency process" that it would ensure that data can be gathered and analyzed across the federal government. Lastly, the report was said to identify potential national security threats and assess whether any of the United States adversaries could be behind such activity. While required to be public, the report could contain a classified annex.

The mandate came after articles published by The New York Times and Politico confirmed the existence of the Advanced Aerospace Threat Identification Program, a Department of Defense program that began in 2007 to investigate unidentified phenomena, which officially ended in 2012. On August 14, 2020, a successor of this program, the Unidentified Aerial Phenomena Task Force, was established in the Office of Naval Intelligence. The Department of Defense would eventually release three videos recorded by US Navy pilots that were part of UAPTF investigations, which became collectively known as the Pentagon UFO videos.

== Report ==
On June 25, 2021, a nine-page preliminary assessment was issued. It states that the UAPTF focused on 144 observations of "unidentified aerial phenomena" by the U.S Armed Forces, mostly from U.S. Navy personnel, from 2004 to 2021. No details are given in the preliminary assessment. The report found that the UAPTF was unable to identify causes of the observations found in 143 reports. The one object that was able to be identified "with high confidence" was "a large, deflating balloon". It asserted 18 of these incidents featured "unusual flight characteristics", these UAP "appeared to remain stationary in winds aloft, move against the wind, maneuver abruptly, or move at considerable speed, without discernible means of propulsion." Some of them, the report says, released radio frequency energy that was picked up and processed by U.S. military aircraft, with further analysis needed to determine if those sightings represented "breakthrough technology". The report said that some of these steps are resource-intensive and would require additional investment. It did not link the sightings to extraterrestrial life, with officials saying "We have no clear indications that there is any nonterrestrial explanation for them — but we will go wherever the data takes us".

There were "11 reports of documented instances in which pilots reported near misses with a UAP." The report established five potential explanatory categories: airborne clutter, natural atmospheric phenomena, U.S. government or American industry developmental programs, foreign adversary systems and a catch-all "other" category.

=== Classified annex ===
The report was published online and delivered to the House and Senate intelligence committees with a classified annex. One person who attended the classified briefing, speaking on condition of anonymity, said that lawmakers were given "little information beyond what's publicly available" and that the only videos shown had already been made public.

== Categories ==
The report observed that "UAP probably lack a single explanation" and named five categories of potential explanations for the objects observed between 2004 and 2021:

- Airborne clutter: These objects include birds, balloons, recreational unmanned aerial vehicles (UAV), or airborne debris like plastic bags that muddle a scene and affect an operator's ability to identify true targets, such as enemy aircraft.
- Natural atmospheric phenomena: Natural atmospheric phenomena includes ice crystals, moisture, and thermal fluctuations that may register on some infrared and radar systems.
- U.S. Government (USG) or industry developmental programs: Some UAP observations could be attributable to developments and classified programs by U.S. entities. The report was unable to confirm, however, that these systems accounted for any of the UAP reports we collected.
- Foreign adversary systems: Some UAP may be technologies deployed by China, Russia, another nation, or a non-governmental entity.
- Other: Although most of the UAP described in our dataset probably remain unidentified due to limited data or challenges to collection processing or analysis, we may require additional scientific knowledge to successfully collect on, analyze and characterize some of them.

According to The Washington Post, the first category includes "junk — man-made objects cluttering the air, such as balloons or even plastic bags, that are mistaken for craft". The second category includes such things as "ice crystals, moisture or heat fluctuations could register as a flying object to cameras and sensors on aircraft or aboard ships at sea". The third category includes aircraft designed by the U.S. government or an American corporation, however officials have stated that they were "unable to confirm" that the UAPs are not American technology. The fourth category describes aircraft designed by a foreign adversary, such as China and Russia, which the Post noted "are making strides in hypersonic technology and directed energy, areas of increasing focus at the Pentagon", and the report stated that the agency "lacked the data" to confirm if the objects reported were deployed by foreign adversary. The fifth category is "something of a catchall that could apply to encounters that were brief or generated too little data", and according to the Post, "one sure to entice ufologists and amateur sleuths, as well as U.S. officials".

== Reactions and aftermath ==
The report was largely considered to be inconclusive.

The UAPTF announced it was working to acquire additional reporting, including from the US Air Force, and had begun receiving data from the Federal Aviation Administration (FAA). It also announced that "efforts are under way to standardize incident reporting across US military services and other government agencies to ensure all relevant data is captured", noting that no standard reporting mechanism existed before the Navy created one in March 2019.

Deputy Secretary of Defense, Kathleen Hicks, issued a memo following the report's release, saying that it highlights the problem of flight hazards near military training ranges. She ordered the Pentagon's top intelligence and security official to establish a more formal means of coordinating the collection, reporting and analysis of UAP information, adding that "It is equally critical that all U.S. military aircrews or government personnel report whenever aircraft or other devices interfere with military training. This includes the observation and reporting of UAPs." Furthermore, the Hicks memo said that all members of the Department of Defense will utilize a set of established processes to ensure that the UAPTF "have reports of UAP observations within two weeks of an occurrence." Pentagon Press Secretary John Kirby said the intelligence office had been ordered to develop a plan to formalize that mission.

Senate Intelligence Committee Chairman Sen. Mark Warner said that "The United States must be able to understand and mitigate threats to our pilots, whether they're from drones or weather balloons or adversary intelligence capabilities." Senator Marco Rubio stated that "This report is an important first step in cataloging these incidents, but it is just a first step", adding that "The Defense Department and Intelligence Community have a lot of work to do before we can actually understand whether these aerial threats present a serious national security concern."

The report mentioned that the agencies would update Congress on their progress within the next 90 days.

== Response and analysis ==
According to Wired writer Adam Mann, "the current craze over UFOs is in many ways traceable back to To the Stars". In 2017, the company made the Pentagon UFO videos available to the New York Times, and subsequent publicity eventually prompted confirmation of the videos' origin from the US military. Mainstream publications such as The New Yorker "subsequently published credulous alien articles", and members of Congress later included a provision ordering the Defense Department to deliver a UFO report within six months as part of their December 2020 omnibus spending and coronavirus-relief legislation.

Although the report found no evidence of alien origins for UAPs and offered technologies deployed by China, Russia, or other nations as a possible explanation, To the Stars executive Jim Semivan and founder Tom DeLonge reject the idea that Russian or Chinese technology is responsible for UAP and UFO reports and instead believe they are the result of "extraterrestrial, the interdimensional, and the ultra-terrestrial, meaning members of a lost human civilization here on Earth, à la Atlantis".

Skeptic and science writer Mick West noted that "advocates of alien disclosure are encroaching on these real issues of UAPs...these believers take mundane videos of incidents that are simply unidentified, then reframe them as evidence of extraordinary technology — which, of course, is intended to mean 'aliens,' even if enthusiasts for that hypothesis will not explicitly say so. This cultivates credulous media attention, which in turn creates a feedback loop of public interest, more media and then pressure on politicians to 'do something'". West has analyzed the UFO videos released by the U.S. military to determine if some of the incidents could be due to flaws in newly deployed radar systems or various visual artifacts regularly seen in cameras. West noted that "there have been many reports of drones above or near restricted areas", and that pilots may misidentify such objects. According to West, "If something there is hard to identify — like a novel drone — then we need to figure out how to identify it. If the pilots are making mistakes, then we need to figure out why". West contends that the report has been mischaracterized in the media and by UFO enthusiasts, saying "UAPs are unidentified because of limited data; that's what makes the cases difficult to explain," adding that "The report suggests the majority of cases, if solved, would turn out to be a variety of things like airborne clutter or natural atmospheric phenomenon. A lack of data does not mean aliens are the likely answer."

Research scientist in planetary studies at NASA's Goddard Space Flight Center Ravi Kumar Kopparapu said "There may not be a single explanation to all such observations". According to Kopparapu, "The report would be immensely helpful if the data that informed it are made publicly available so that more experts and scientists can look at it and hopefully reach a scientific consensus on the nature of some of the unexplained events. Otherwise, there will always be conspiracy theories shrouding, and inhibiting, a proper scientific investigation of UAPs".

University of Pennsylvania historian Kathryn Dorsch sees parallels with Cold War era interest in UFOs and says that alien-piloted UFOs are not a likely explanation. According to Dorsch, "God love the US Air Force, but answering fundamental epistemological questions is not super high on their to-do list. This is why the military has always struggled with this UFO question. They want to know if this thing is a threat, and if it's not, great."

According to New York Magazine writer for the Digital Intelligencer, Jeff Wise, advanced electronic warfare (EW) techniques similar to early "radar spoofing" used by the US military could deceive sensors to give false velocity and position information. Wise worries that US adversaries have developed EW capabilities that exploit weaknesses in US systems that allow information to be missed or created erroneously. Wise speculates that admitting the US has "gaps in its electronic warfare capabilities" would allow it to be looked at objectively. As Navy Spokesman Joseph Gradisher puts it, "The more data you have, the better you are to analyze it and turn that data into information into knowledge."

== See also ==
- Pentagon UFO videos
- Unidentified Aerial Phenomena Task Force
- The Phenomenon (2020 film)
- Project Sign
- Project Grudge
- Project Blue Book
- Robertson Panel
- Condon Committee
- UFO sightings in outer space
- United States UFO files
- 1952 Washington, D.C. UFO incident
