= NASA Unidentified Anomalous Phenomena Independent Study Team =

Panel to study unidentified anomalous phenomena

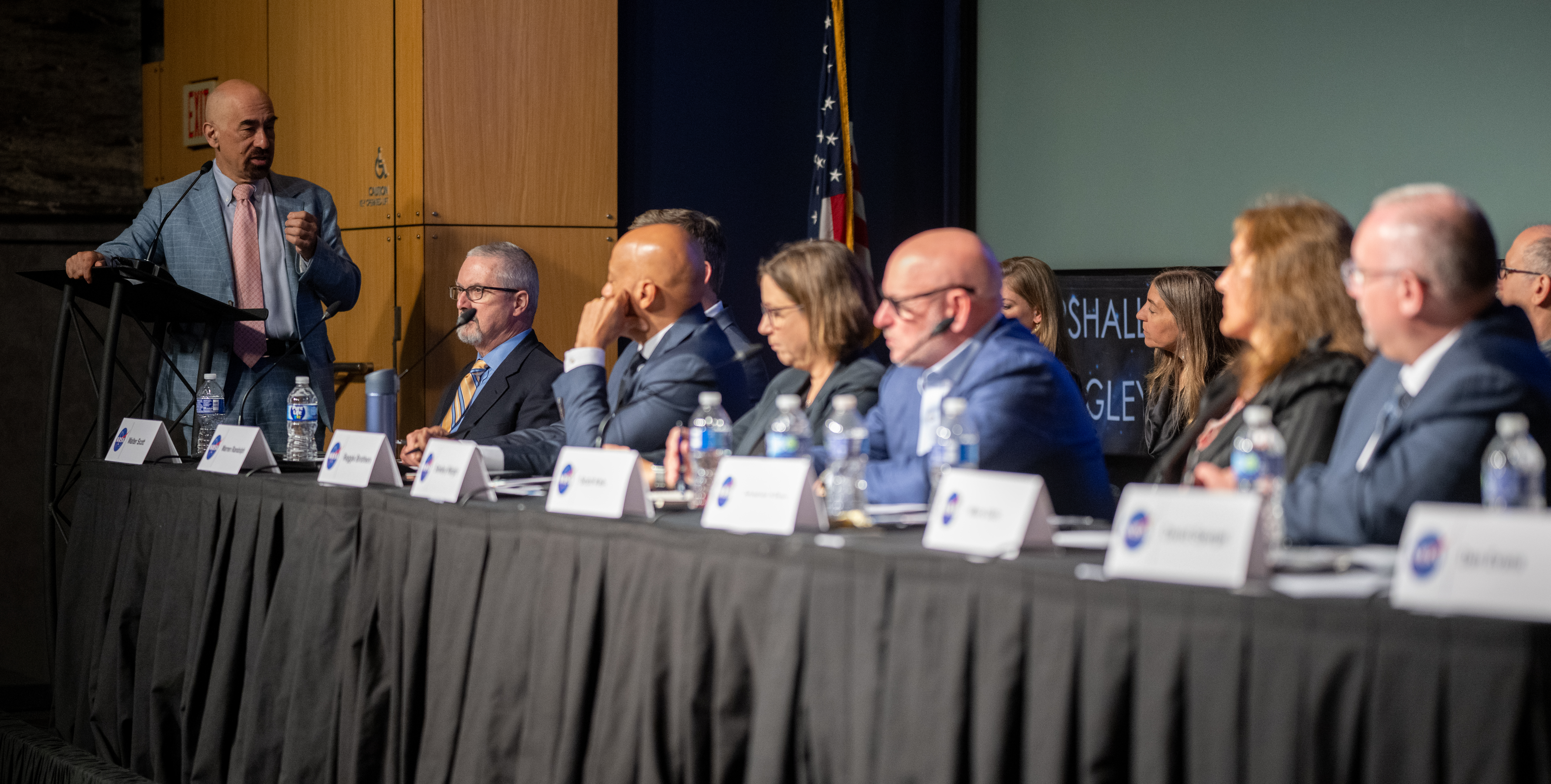
- David Spergel, chair of NASA's independent study on UAPs, answers a question during a public meeting of the team on May 31, 2023.

Agency overview
- Formed: May 24, 2022
- Dissolved: September 14, 2023
- Agency executives: David Spergel, chair; Daniel Evans, designated federal official
- Parent agency: NASA
- Website: Official website

The NASA Unidentified Anomalous Phenomena Independent Study Team (UAPIST) was a panel of sixteen experts assembled in 2022 by the United States National Aeronautics and Space Administration (NASA) and chaired by David Spergel to recommend a roadmap for the analysis of unidentified anomalous phenomena (UAPs) by NASA and other organizations.

UAPs are defined as phenomena or observations of events in the air, sea, space, and land that cannot be identified as aircraft or as known natural phenomena. The acronym UAP seeks to provide separation from the assumptions about extraterrestrial life and other associations in popular culture with the older acronym UFO ("unidentified flying object"). UAP originally stood for "unidentified aerial phenomena", but was expanded at the end of 2022 to mean "unidentified anomalous phenomena". To complete their work, the independent NASA team identified how data gathered by civilian, commercial, and government entities as well as any other sources can most effectively be analyzed to shed light on UAPs.

The study team started work on October 24, 2022, and held its first public meeting on May 31, 2023. The team's report was released on September 14, 2023, and did not find evidence that extra-terrestrial life was responsible for the unexplained phenomena of UAP sightings. Unlike the All-domain Anomaly Resolution Office (AARO) under the United States Office of the Secretary of Defense, the NASA independent study team focused solely on unclassified data.

== Scope and objectives ==
The Unidentified Aerial Phenomena Independent Study Team (UAPIST) was formally established by Karen St. Germain, the director of NASA's Earth Science Division, as a subcommittee of the Earth Science Advisory Committee (ESAC). The terms of reference establishing the group were signed on May 24, 2022.

In its June 2022 announcement of plans to form the UAPIST, NASA named astrophysicist David Spergel as the chair of the team, and Daniel Evans, the assistant deputy associate administrator for research at NASA's Science Mission Directorate, as the official responsible for orchestrating the study. The team's objective, according to Spergel, was to gather the most robust set of data possible, given the lack of observations, and "to identify what data – from civilians, government, non-profits, companies – exists, what else we should try to collect, and how to best analyze it." NASA summarized this objective as securing "the counsel of experts in the scientific, aeronautics, and data analytics communities to focus on how best to collect new data and improve observations of UAPs". They further noted that "consistent with NASA's principles of openness, transparency, and scientific integrity", the findings will be shared publicly as "all of NASA's data is available to the public" and "easily accessible for anyone to see or study". NASA clarified that this new study was unrelated to their "active astrobiology program that focuses on the origins, evolution, and distribution of life beyond Earth". Finally, the announcement specified that NASA's UAP study team would be a second and independent undertaking from the program under Department of Defense direction, saying, "the agency is not part of the Department of Defense's Unidentified Anomalous Phenomena Task Force or its successor, the Airborne Object Identification and Management Synchronization Group" although NASA has "coordinated widely across the government regarding how to apply the tools of science to shed light on the nature and origin of unidentified anomalous phenomena".

In July 2022, one month after NASA's announcement of its independent UAP study team, the United States Department of Defense replaced the Airborne Object Identification and Management Synchronization Group with the All-domain Anomaly Resolution Office (AARO).

Further terms of reference were signed on May 18, 2023, extending the UAPIST and renaming it by changing "Aerial" to "Anomalous". In its first public meeting on May 31, 2023, Sean Kirkpatrick, the director of the Defense Department's AARO task force, was invited to give the opening remarks. Kirkpatrick said that "though NASA and AARO are taking on different aspects of the UAP problem set, our efforts are very much complementary" as both are committed to the scientific method and a data-driven approach. According to Kirkpatrick, "NASA is evaluating unclassified data sources for its study", while "AARO's data set includes classified material with a focus on national security areas". In contrast, "NASA brings unique capabilities, world-class scientists, and a wealth of academic and research linkages" with "access to earth sensing satellites, radiological sensors, tools for gravitational wave and geomagnetic detection and means of analyzing crowd-sourced data that may assist AARO and NASA in their UAP efforts". AARO is "grateful for the partnership", said Kirkpatrick, and welcomes "the opportunity to join with NASA to share our collective findings with the public as the U.S. Government moves towards greater transparency on this issue".

== UAP versus UFO terminology ==
According to Merriam-Webster, "the term UAP first appeared in the late 1960s, while unidentified flying object has been around since 1947". As summarized in ETC: A Review of General Semantics, "aside from UAP's more encompassing description, this term avoids the heavy cultural baggage attached to UFO, whose initial association with extraterrestrial origins ...sets up a narrow and inflexible framework for honest scientific research." The term UFO now has decades of association with aliens across many areas of culture, popular entertainment, conspiracy theories, and religious movements as considered in American Cosmic by Diana Walsh Pasulka. "Unidentified aerial phenomena (UAP), formerly referred to as UFOs, in theory, could include alien spacecraft, but the two aren't synonymous." At the start of 2023, NASA updated the name of its independent study team from "unidentified aerial phenomena" to "unidentified anomalous phenomena" to be "consistent with the James M. Inhofe National Defense Authorization Act for Fiscal Year 2023, signed into law on December 23, 2022".

== Team members ==
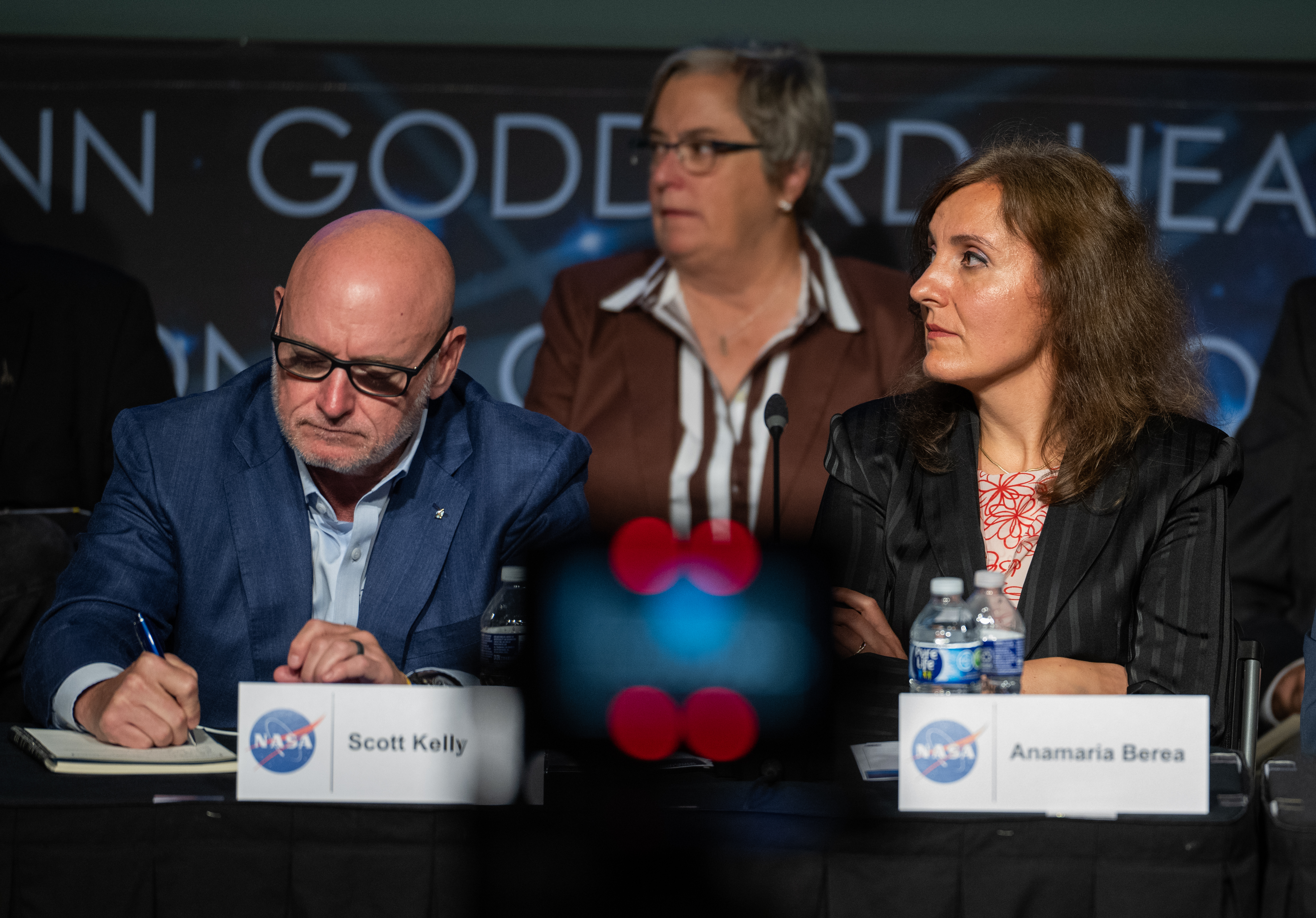
Scott Kelly, former NASA astronaut, left, and Anamaria Berea, associate professor of Computational and Data Science at George Mason University, during a public meeting of NASA's UAP independent study team on May 31, 2023.

NASA's UAP study team members were announced on October 21, 2022.

1. David Spergel
2. Anamaria Berea (professor of Computational and Data Science at George Mason University)
3. Federica Bianco (physics professor at the University of Delaware)
4. Paula Bontempi
5. Reggie Brothers (the operating partner at AE Industrial Partners in Boca Raton, Florida)
6. Jen Buss (the CEO of the Potomac Institute for Policy Studies)
7. Nadia Drake
8. Mike Gold (executive vice president Redwire)
9. David Grinspoon
10. Scott Kelly
11. Matt Mountain
12. Warren Randolph (deputy executive director of the Federal Aviation Administration's (FAA) Accident Investigation and Prevention for Aviation Safety Department)
13. Walter Scott (vice president and chief technology officer of Maxar Technologies)
14. Joshua Semeter (professor of electrical and computer engineering and director of the Center for Space Physics at Boston University)
15. Karlin Toner (acting executive director of the FAA's Office of Aviation Policy and Plans)
16. Shelley Wright (professor of physics at the University of California, San Diego's Center for Astrophysics and Space Studies)

Greg Eghigian, a history professor at Penn State who has written about the history of the UFO phenomenon, noted that the NASA study team represents "a sea change," as "close to a majority of academics now believe that the study of UFOs warrants scholarly research", that the team can establish "a roadmap for looking into UAPs", and that this activity is "unprecedented [because] NASA, historically, wanted nothing to do with UFOs, and [now] these civilian scientists are asking scientifically informed questions".

== Team member commentary ==
In their first public meeting on May 31, 2023, the NASA team faced a wide range of general questions, primarily focused on UFOs. The team reported that their priorities include methods of collecting empirical data on, and improving analysis of, UAPs. Spergel said that "many of the UAP events can be attributed to commercial aircraft, drones, and research balloons, as well as weather and ionospheric phenomena," adding that "there remain events that we do not understand" and that these events "tend to be characterized by poor quality and limited data". Noting the value of further investigating such unknowns, Spergel pointed to the "history of fast radio bursts" because when "examination confirmed the bursts were cosmic in nature, emerging from astrophysical cataclysms scattered across the universe" this demonstrated how "sometimes anomalies are really interesting and point to novel physical phenomenon."

Regarding David Grusch's claims of a government coverup(s) regarding UFOs, team member Joshua Semeter said that, absent more information, little can be said about the Grusch claims, adding that the NASA team is "working in collaboration with the Defense Department's All-domain Anomaly Resolution Office," with his panel's specific objective being "to create a roadmap for how NASA assets and expertise can contribute to determining the origin and nature of UAP."

== Final report ==
NASA Unidentified Anomalous Phenomena Independent Study Team Report

The independent study team's final report was published on September 14, 2023, with NASA also announcing the appointment of a director of UAP research. The study team reported that no evidence of extra-terrestrial life was found. The report also stated that the absence of reproducible data makes it challenging to draw conclusions about some UAP origins. It was recommended that a "rigorous, evidence-based approach" be used to study UAP and that data collection methods include artificial intelligence and citizen observers, and stated that NASA is "well-positioned" to lead this study of UAP. According to its 2023 terms of reference, the team was dissolved upon the completion and submission of its final report.

== See also ==
- NASA Director of UAP Research
- United States UFO files
