= The Report on Unidentified Flying Objects =

1956 book by Edward J. Ruppelt

- Author: Edward J. Ruppelt
- Subject: Unidentified flying objects
- Publisher: Doubleday
- Publication date: 1956
- Publication place: United States
- Pages: 315
- LC Class: TL789 .R8
- Text: The Report on Unidentified Flying Objects at Wikisource

The Report on Unidentified Flying Objects is a 1956 book by then-retired Air Force UFO investigator Edward J. Ruppelt, detailing his experience running Project Blue Book. The book was noted for its suggestion that a few UFO sightings might be linked to spikes of atomic radiation. Contemporary media summarized four topics discussed in the book:

- There is "no real proof" that flying saucers exist—no reliable photographs, no "hardware".
- While the Air Force is officially dismissive of the spaceship theory, that conclusion is "far from unanimous".
- Some staff within the Air Force had produced a UFO analysis, called the "Estimate of the Situation", concluding that some UFOs were interplanetary spaceships. That analysis was rejected by a panel of scientists meeting in January 1953.
- Technological explanations were not considered: "No one at the meeting gave a second thought to the possibility that the UFOs might be super-secret US aircraft or a Soviet Development".

In 1960, Ruppelt authored a second edition in which he reported being "positive" that UFOs do not exist.

== Contents ==
Ruppelt was a captain in the US Air Force who served as director of official investigations into UFOs: Project Grudge and Project Bluebook. During his time as director, Ruppelt had coined the term UFO.

In the foreword, Ruppelt argues: "It is well known that ever since the first flying saucer was reported in June 1947 the Air Force has officially said that there is no proof that such a thing as an interplanetary spaceship exists. But what is not well known is that this conclusion is far from being unanimous among the military and their scientific advisers".

=== Introduction ===
Ruppelt begins Chapter One with a tale, set in Summer 1952, where an unnamed F-86 fighter pilot fires on an unidentified target, only to be ridiculed as having 'cracked up' or panicked. Ruppelt claims the report on the incident was burned and never submitted to Bluebook—Ruppelt claims he learned of the incident through informal channels.

Ruppelt describes how Bluebook handled income UFO reports. Many stories were classed "Insufficient Data for Evaluation", while a "Crackpot" file held reports from people "who had talked with flying saucer crews, who had inspected flying saucers that had landed in the United States, who had ridden in flying saucers, or who were members of flying saucer crews." In contrast, potentially-"good" reports were those from trusted, trained observers like higher-ranking military personnel.

Ruppelt describes giving briefings to students at Air Force's Command and Staff school, Air Force Intelligence School, Office of Naval Research, as well as the Atomic Energic Commission's Los Alamos laboratory and Sandia Base.

Ruppelt notes the discrepancy between public denials of official interest during the same era his groups was actively studying UFOs: "All of this time unnamed Air Force officials were disclaiming serious interest in the UFO subject. Yet every time a newspaper reporter went out to interview a person who had seen a UFO, intelligence agents had already been flown in, gotten the detailed story complete with sketches of the UFO, and sped back to their base to send the report to Project Sign. Many people had supposedly been "warned" not to talk too much. The Air Force was mighty interested in hallucinations."

=== 1947 craze ===
Chapter Two, "The Era of Confusion Begins", discusses the Kenneth Arnold UFO sighting and the subsequent 1947 flying disc craze. After initial skepticism, sightings from military personnel caught the attention of the Air Force Technical Intelligence Center. Ruppelt explains that "as more UFO's were observed near the Air Force's Muroc Test Center, the Army's White Sands Proving Ground, and atomic bomb plants, ATIC's efforts became more concentrated."

Ruppelt described the Maury Island Incident, in which original saucer witness Kenneth Arnold was given mundane lava rocks claimed to have come from flying saucer. Arnold contacted Air Force investigators, who flew to investigate. On their return, the two investigators died when their plane suffered engine trouble.

=== Twining memo ===
Images of the Twining Memo
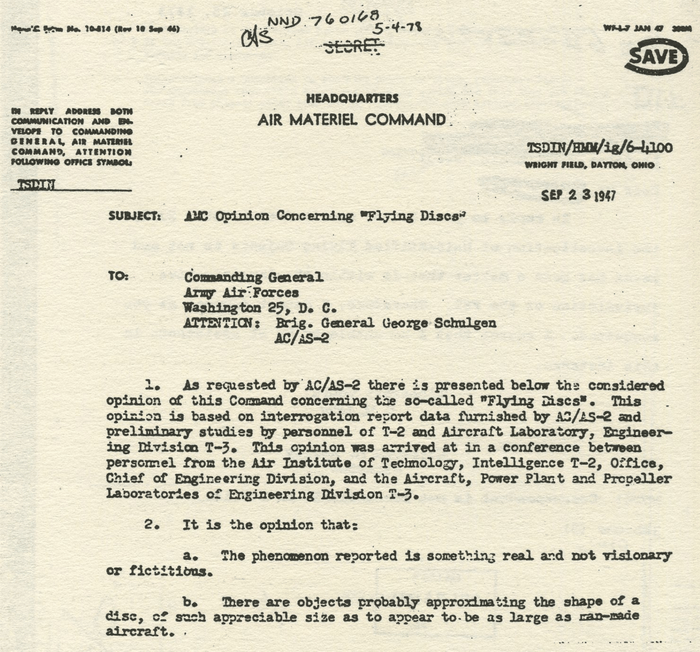
1

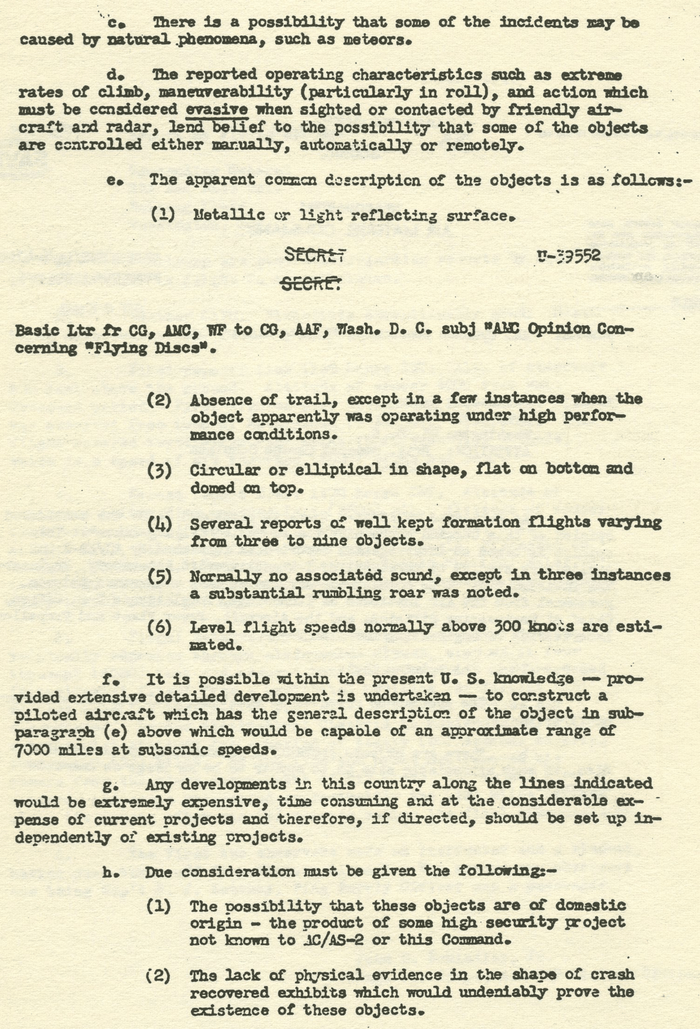
2

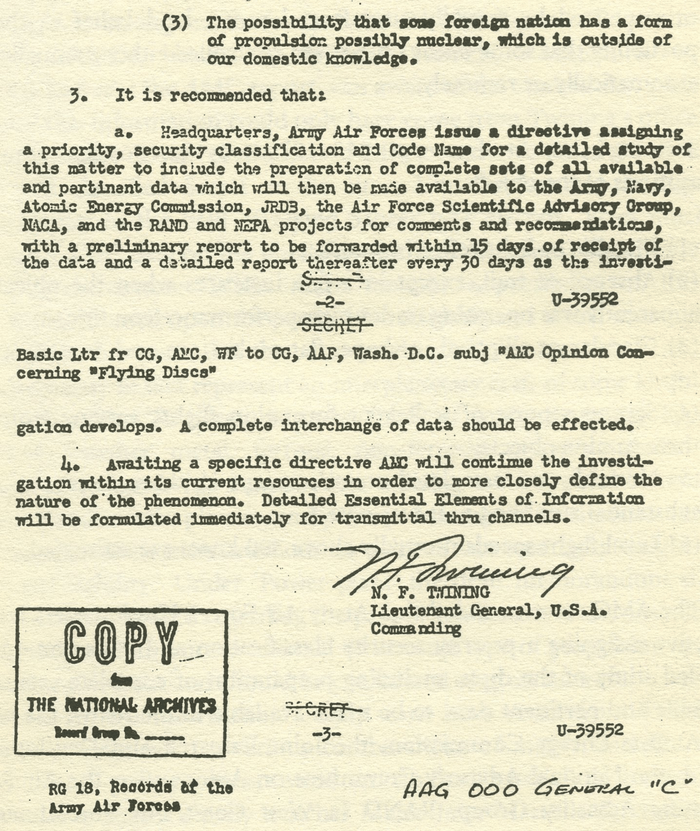
3

The Report on Unidentified Flying Objects was the first to reveal that on September 23, 1947, Lieutenant General Nathan Twining had issued a memo to Brigadier General George Schulgen of the Army Air Forces. The subject line of the memo read "AMC Opinion Concerning 'Flying Discs.'" The general tone of the memo was that unidentified objects seen in the skies by military personnel were not weather, astronomical or other phenomenon but rather objects that warranted further investigation. Twining wrote "The phenomenon reported is something real and not visionary or fictitious."

The Twining memo should not be confused with the "Cutler/Twining memo" dated July 14, 1954, included as part of the alleged Majestic 12 documents in 1985. The Federal Bureau of Investigation (FBI) declared those documents to be "completely bogus", and many ufologists consider them to be an elaborate hoax.

=== 1948: pilot sightings and green fireballs ===
Chapter Three, "The Classics" discusses the three most prominent reports of 1948: The Mantell Incident, where a National Guard pilot died chasing a UFO; The Chiles-Whitted Incident, where airline pilots reported a near-collision with a UFO; and the Gorman Dogfight, where a National Guard pilot engaged a UFO. Ruppelt discusses alleged incidents at Oak Ridge and Hanford, both major US atomic plants. Ruppelt discusses a report from Germany, dated November 23, 1948, which marked the first report featuring visual contact while simultaneously being picked up on radar.

Chapter Four, "Green Fireballs, Project Twinkle, Little Lights, and Grudge", being with descriptions of green fireballs first seen over New Mexico in November 1948. Ruppelt recalls "They might be common meteorites, psychologically enlarged flares, or true UFO's, but whatever they were they were playing around in one of the most sensitive security areas in the United States." Ruppelt reports that a conference was called at Los Alamos in February 1949.

In Summer 1949, the Air Force's Cambridge Research Laboratories established "Project Twinkle" to attempt to photograph the objects; it yielded no results.

=== Project Sign and The Estimate of the Situation ===
The Report on Unidentified Flying Objects was the first to reveal the existence of Project Sign. Ruppelt also claimed that Sign had produced an "Estimate of the Situation" which endorsed an interplanetary explanation for UFOs, but General Hoyt Vandenberg, Chief of Staff of the Air Force, shut down Project Sign for lack of proof.

Folklore historian Curtis Peebles described the Estimate as "the most controversial document in the early history of the flying saucer myth". In the wake of the Report, top Air Force officials denied the Estimate ever existed. No copy of this document or any other corroboration of Ruppelt's claim has been produced, and Popular Mechanics called the report "probably more mythological than real".

=== Project Grudge ===
Chapter Five, "The Dark Ages", describes the shift from Project Sign to Project Grudge, beginning February 11, 1949. Ruppelt charges that "standard intelligence procedures were no longer being used by Project Grudge. Everything was being evaluated on the premise that UFO's couldn't exist. No matter what you see or hear, don't believe it." Ruppelt alleged that some "charter members of Project Sign had been 'purged.' These were the people who had refused to change their original opinions about UFO's."

Chapter Six, "The Presses Roll—The Air Force Shrugs", describes how increasing public reporting of UFOs was met with relative indifference by the Air Force, who continued to maintain such objects did not exist. Chapter Seven, "The Pentagon Rumbles", discussed the publication of Frank Scully's book Behind the Flying Saucers with its tales of the Aztec, NM UFO hoax. After a Life Magazine article, official interest in UFOs begins to climb again.

Chapter Eight, "The Lubbock Lights, Unabridged", discusses the Lubbock Lights incident of September 1951. In Chapter Nine, "The New Project Grudge", Air Force investigators partners with civilian researchers to improve UFO reporting and investigation. Ruppelt argues that "UFO's were seen more frequently around areas vital to the defense of the United States. The Los Alamos-Albuquerque area, Oak Ridge, and White Sands Proving Ground rated high. Port areas, Strategic Air Command bases, and industrial areas ranked next... The frequency of the UFO reports was interesting. Every July there was a sudden increase in the number of reports and July was always the peak month of the year. Just before Christmas there was usually a minor peak." Chapter Ten, "Project Blue Book and the Big Build-Up", describes Ruppelt's activities during the first months of 1952, including a Life Magazine article titled Life Magazine article titled "Have We Visitors From Space?".

=== 1952 'flap' ===
Chapter Eleven, "The Big Flap", discusses the UFO 'wave' of Summer 1952, culminating in the Washington, D.C., UFO incident. Chapter Twelve, "The Washington Merry-Go-Round", describes official reactions to the D.C. incident, culminating in Gen. Sanford's press conference.

=== Radiation and UFOs ===
Chapter Thirteen, "Hoax or Horror?", describes Ruppelt's investigation of a Boy Scout leader alleged burned and rendered unconscious by a UFO. In Chapter Fourteen, "Digesting the Data", Ruppelt describes plans to observe UFOs during the H-Bomb tests in the Pacific and a proposal for 'visual spotting stations' in northern New Mexico. Chapter Fifteen, "The Radiation Story", examines a supposed link between UFOs and radiation. Chapter Sixteen, "The Hierarchy Ponders", describes the composition of the final report.

=== Conclusion ===
In the seventeenth and final chapter, "What Are UFO's?", Ruppelt opines "I wouldn't want to hazard a guess as to what the final outcome of the UFO investigation will be, but I am sure that within a few years there will be a proven answer." The book concludes: "Maybe the final proven answer will be that all of the UFO's that have been reported are merely misidentified known objects. Or maybe the many pilots, radar specialists, generals, industrialists, scientists, and the man on the street who have told me, "I wouldn't have believed it either if I hadn't seen it myself," knew what they were talking about. Maybe the earth is being visited by interplanetary spaceships. Only time will tell."

== 1960 edition ==
Four years after the original publication, Ruppelt released a new edition with three additional chapters. In these, Ruppelt "seemed to have changed course", declaring UFOs to be a "Space Age Myth".

In the first chapter, "And They're Still Flying", Ruppelt covered late 1950s sightings in Ohio, Colorado, and Kansas. Ruppelt discuses the formation of the National Investigations Committee On Aerial Phenomena (NICAP), a non-profit organization established to investigate UFO reports, and his subsequent testimony before the United States Senate Committee on Government Operations. In the second new chapter, "Off They Go into the Wild Blue Yonder", Ruppelt details George Adamski's wild stories of repeatedly traveling to Venus aboard a flying saucer, likening Adamski to P. T. Barnum.

In the final chapter, "Do They or Don't They?", Ruppelt responds to the question "Do unidentified flying objects exist?" with the answer: "I'm positive they don't".

== Reaction and legacy ==
The book has been called the "most significant" of its era. The Buffalo News covered the book under the headline "You Saw a Space Ship? Air Force Won't Deny It", writing "Ruppelt reports their conclusion as one of rejection the theory that the objects are space ships, on the ground that there is no definite proof. However they did not reject the possibility and they urged the Air Force to continue investigating".

A 1956 review described the Report as "the sober reporting of a man who was in charge of one of the official investigations", arguing that "Ruppelt never advances an explanation of what is inexplicable". In the 1970s, UFO researcher J. Allen Hynek suggested that Ruppelt's "book should be required reading for anyone seriously interested in the history of this subject".

Historian Curtis Peebles concludes that the book "should have ended the speculation about an Air Force cover-up. In fact, Ruppelt's statements were converted into support for the cover-up idea."

== See also ==
- Unidentified Flying Objects: The True Story of Flying Saucers, a similar documentary film also from 1956
