= Green fireballs =

Unidentified flying objects

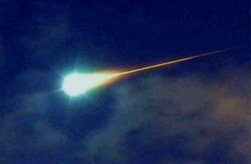
An example of a bright, green-hued bolide

Green fireballs are a type of unidentified flying object (UFO) that has been reported since the late 1940s. Early sightings primarily occurred in the southwestern United States, particularly in New Mexico. Although some ufologists and ufology organizations consider green fireballs to be of possible extraterrestrial origin, mainstream explanations have been provided, including that they are natural bolides, a type of exceptionally bright meteor.

== Reports and responses ==
Early observations of green fireballs date to late 1948 in New Mexico, and include reports from two plane crews, one civilian and the other military, on the night of 5 December 1948. These crews described the observed fireballs as a bright "green ball of fire" and "like a huge green meteor". On 8 December, another aerial observation of a green fireball was reported by two pilots. Ufologist Kevin Randle reported that University of New Mexico astronomer Lincoln LaPaz had addressed officials regarding his own 12 December sighting, attesting that the observed object "was not a conventional meteorite fall", but ultimately stating that its path had experienced a "drooping" near the end of the sighting and that the "green fireball broke into fragments, still bright green". On 13 January 1949, the Director of Army Intelligence from the Fourth Army Headquarters in Texas wrote that the green fireballs "[may be] the result of radiological warfare experiments by a foreign power" and that they "are of such great importance, especially as they are occurring in the vicinity of sensitive installations, that a scientific board [should]...study the situation."

A February 1949 conference at Los Alamos attended by members of Project Sign, scientists including Joseph Kaplan and Edward Teller, and military personnel was unable to identify the origin of the observed green fireballs. Edward Ruppelt and ufologists like Jerome Clark claimed that conferences at Los Alamos and elsewhere that addressed the green fireball phenomenon were secretly convened later in 1949. In December 1949, a network of green fireball observation and photographic units called Project Twinkle was established but never fully implemented. It was discontinued two years later, with the official conclusion that the phenomena were likely natural in origin.

Theoretical astrophysicist and UFO skeptic Donald Menzel claimed to have observed in May 1949 a green fireball near Alamogordo, which he later considered to be an ordinary meteor. Green fireballs have more recently been observed in Japan, Australia, West Virginia, and Tennessee.

== Explanations ==
Some ufologists consider green fireballs to be of artificial, extraterrestrial origin. Beyond meteors or bolides containing magnesium and nickel, outlier scientific explanations include sequelae of atomic weapons tests, including clouds of nuclear fallout, lunar material ejected from meteor impacts on the Moon's surface, and aircraft associated with secret military projects.

== See also ==
- List of UFO sightings
- UFO conspiracy theory

== Sources ==
- Jerome Clark, The UFO Book: Encyclopedia of the Extraterrestrial, Visible Ink Press, 1998.
- Edward J. Ruppelt, The Report on Unidentified Flying Objects, 1956, Chapt. 4
- Brad Steiger, Project Blue Book, Ballantine Books, 1976
