= Lubbock Lights =

Unusual light formation over Lubbock, Texas, between August and September 1951

Location of Lubbock, Texas

The Lubbock Lights were an unusual formation of lights seen over the city of Lubbock, Texas in August and September 1951. The Lubbock Lights incident received national publicity in the United States as a UFO sighting, and was investigated by the U.S. Air Force. According to Captain Edward J. Ruppelt, "Officially all of the sightings, except the UFO that was picked up on radar, are unknowns."

== The sightings ==
Edward J. Ruppelt wrote that the first sighting was reported by three professors from Texas Technological College (now Texas Tech University), located in Lubbock on August 25, 1951, at around 9 pm. According to Ruppelt, they were sitting in the backyard of one of the professor's homes when they observed a total of 20–30 lights, as bright as stars but larger in size, flying overhead. Ruppelt wrote that the professors immediately ruled out meteors as a possible cause for the sightings, and as they discussed their sighting a second, similar, group of lights flew overhead.

Ruppelt said the names of the three professors were A. G. Oberg, chemical engineer; W. L. Ducker, a department head and petroleum engineer; and W. I. Robinson, a geologist who reported their sighting to the local newspaper, the Lubbock Avalanche-Journal. According to UFO author Jerome Clark, three women in Lubbock reported that they had observed "peculiar flashing lights" in the sky on the same night as the professors' sightings, as well as Carl Hemminger, a professor of German at Texas Tech.

Clark writes that on September 5, 1951, all three men, along with E. Richard Heineman, a mathematics professor, and one other professor from Texas Tech, were sitting in Robinson's front yard when the lights flew overhead. According to one of the professors named Grayson Mead, the lights "appeared to be about the size of a dinner plate and they were greenish-blue, slightly fluorescent in color. They were smaller than the full moon at the horizon. There were about a dozen to fifteen of these lights... they were absolutely circular... it gave all of us... an extremely eerie feeling." Mead said that the lights could not have been birds, but he also stated that they "went over so fast... that we wished we could have had a better look." Clark wrote that the professors observed one formation of lights flying above a thin cloud at about 2,000 feet (610 m) which he says allowed them to calculate that the lights were traveling at over 600 miles per hour (970 km/h).

== The Hart photographs ==
Hart photos

On the evening of August 30, 1951, Carl Hart, Jr., a freshman at Texas Tech, observed a group of 18–20 white lights in a "v" formation flying overhead. Hart took a 35-mm Kodak camera and walked to the backyard of his parents’ home to see if the lights would return. Two more lights passed overhead, and Hart captured five photos before they disappeared. After having the photos developed Hart took them to the offices of the Lubbock Avalanche-Journal where the newspaper's editor, Jay Harris, told Hart that the photos would be purchased for $10 and published in the paper, but that he would "run him (Hart) out of town" if the photos were fake. The photographs were soon reprinted in newspapers around the nation and in Life magazine. The physics laboratory at Wright-Patterson Air Force Base in Ohio analyzed the Hart photographs. After an extensive analysis and investigation of the photos, Edward J. Ruppelt, the supervisor of the Air Force's Project Blue Book, released a written statement to the press that "the [Hart] photos were never proven to be a hoax, but neither were they proven to be genuine." The Texas Tech professors claimed that the photos did not represent what they had observed, because their objects had flown in a "u", rather than a "v", formation.

== Air Force investigation and potential explanations ==
In late September 1951, Ruppelt learned about the Lubbock Lights and investigated them as part of Project Blue Book. Ruppelt traveled to Lubbock and interviewed the professors, Carl Hart, and others who claimed to have witnessed the lights. Ruppelt's conclusion at the time was that the professors had seen a type of bird called a plover. The city of Lubbock had installed new vapor street lights in 1951, and Ruppelt believed migrating plovers were reflecting the new street lights. Witnesses who supported this assertion included T. E. Snider, a local farmer who on August 31, 1951, had observed birds flying over a drive-in movie theater; the birds' undersides were reflected in the light. Another pair of witnesses, Joe Bryant and his wife, on August 25 observed groups of lights flying overhead. When a third group of lights passed overhead they began to circle the Bryants' home, and were identified by sight and sound as plovers. J. Allen Hynek, an astronomer and one of Project Blue Book's scientific consultants, later contacted one of the professors and learned that the professor claimed the lights were plovers.

J.C. Cross, the head of Texas Tech's biology department, and a game warden interviewed by Ruppelt both claimed the sightings could not have been birds. Mead, who had observed the lights, also disputed the plover explanation: "these objects were too large for any bird. ... I have had enough experience hunting and I don't know of any bird that could go this fast we would not be able to hear...to have gone as fast as this, to be birds, they would have to have been exceedingly low to disappear quite so quickly." William Hams, chief photographer for the Lubbock Avalanche-Journal, took several nighttime photos of birds flying over Lubbock's street lights and could not duplicate Hart's photos. Regarding the lights, Ruppelt later wrote:

"They weren't birds, they weren't refracted light, but they weren't spaceships [...] [they were] positively identified as a very commonplace and easily explainable natural phenomenon [...] It is very unfortunate that I can't divulge exactly the way the answer was found because it is an interesting story of how a scientist set up complete instrumentation to track down the lights and how he spent several months testing theory after theory until he finally hit upon the answer. Telling the story would lead to his identity and, in exchange for his story, I promised the man complete anonymity. But he fully convinced me that he had the answer, and after having heard hundreds of explanations of UFO's, I don't convince easily."

== The flying wing ==
While investigating the Lubbock Lights, Ruppelt also learned that several people in and around Lubbock claimed to have seen a "flying wing" moving over the city. Among the witnesses was the wife of Ducker, who reported that in August 1951 she had observed a "huge, soundless flying wing" pass over her house. Ruppelt knew that the US Air Force did possess a "flying wing" jet bomber, and he felt that at least some of the sightings had been caused by the bomber, although he could not explain why, according to the witnesses, the wing made no sound as it flew overhead.

== Publicity and media ==
In April 1952 Life magazine published an article about the UFO phenomenon that featured the Lubbock Lights. Ruppelt devoted a chapter of his 1956 book to the incident.

The British release of the 1953 film Invaders From Mars contained an expanded observatory scene which included the protagonists discussing the Lubbock Lights as evidence for alien visitation to Earth.

In November 1999, Dallas, Texas-based television station KDFW aired a news story about the Lubbock Lights. Reporter Richard Ray interviewed Carl Hart, Jr. about taking the famous photos and being investigated by the U.S. Air Force.

The Lubbock Lights were featured in the 2002 Sci Fi Channel miniseries Taken, in which one alien poses as a human in the Lubbock area.

In 2005, a film called Lubbock Lights was released about the music scene in Lubbock which describes some theories about the lights by the musicians from the area.

In 2006, Lubbock-based alternative country band Thrift Store Cowboys wrote and recorded a song titled "Lubbock Lights" on their third album, Lay Low While Crawling or Creeping.

The third episode of the 2019 History Channel television series Project Blue Book is titled "The Lubbock Lights", and is based on the Lubbock Lights incident.

== See also ==
- Marfa lights
- Levelland UFO case, 1957 report about 30 miles west of Lubbock
- List of reported UFO sightings

== Sources ==
- Clark, Jerome (1998). "The Lubbock Lights". The UFO Book. Detroit: Visible Ink Press. pp. 342–350.
- Ruppelt, Edward J. (1956). The Report on Unidentified Flying Objects. New York: Doubleday.
