= Hector Quintanilla =

American Air Force colonel

U.S. Air Force Lieutenant Colonel Hector Quintanilla who became chief Of the UFO Project Blue Book in August 1963

Hector Quintanilla Jr. (May 7, 1923 – May 18, 1998) was a United States Air Force (USAF) Lieutenant Colonel, best known as the last chief officer of Project Blue Book, the USAF's official unidentified flying object investigative arm.

== Biography ==
Quintanilla was born in Monterrey, Nuevo León, Mexico and immigrated to the United States at age six with his parents and three brothers in 1929. He and his family crossed the Gateway to the Americas International Bridge in Laredo, Texas. His family made their home in the west side of San Antonio, Texas around the Laredo and Martin street neighborhoods; the family could only afford a $1.25 a week shack with a dirt floor. Hector and his brothers did not mind, because they mostly wore their shoes on Sundays to go to church. At age seven, he was selling newspapers for the San Antonio Express and San Antonio Light, mornings and evenings, around the Baptist Medical Hospital area. Quintanilla constructed his own shine box and offered a shoe shine service along with the newspapers, due to the reluctance of some customers to spend two cents for a newspaper during the hard economic times of the Great Depression. He would rise at 4:30 a.m. to prepare for his paper route. Quintanilla was a student at Hawthorne Junior High School and graduated from G.W. Brackenridge High School in San Antonio in 1942. A friend later helped him get a part-time job with the U.S. Post Office. He was enrolled in St. Mary's University, Texas as a freshman when he received his draft notice. He was drafted in 1943 and honorably discharged in 1945. Quintanilla served in the South Pacific Theater in the 13th Air Force, 72nd Squadron, as a bombardier.

Quintanilla received a physics degree from St. Mary's University in 1950. He decided to pursue a military career and was offered a commission of Second Lieutenant in the U.S. Air Force in 1951. In 1954 he was a 1st Lt, in the USAF Security Service 6910th Security Group in Landsberg, Bavaria. He was in charge of a Radio Traffic Analysis Group. His wife, Eleanor, joined him on this tour. His troops had been trained in San Antonio and had enjoyed Mexican food. They recalled that his beautiful wife invited them to a Mexican Christmas dinner in 1954. In 1960, Quintanilla was stationed at Griffiss Air Force Base in Rome, New York.

In August 1963, Quintanilla was made chief of Project Blue Book, a post he held until the study's termination in January 1970. Quintanilla succeeded Lieutenant Colonel Robert Friend. He was selected to be the next Project Blue Book Officer by Colonel Eric T. de Jonckheere, who explained to Quintanilla that he was looking to fill the position with a man with a degree in physics, with maturity, drive, and a man who was cool under pressure; Quintanilla shook his head and felt he only met the physics degree requirement. Colonel Joncheere told Quintanilla to take the job for a few weeks and report back to him. Quintanilla felt he was offered the job due to his reluctance to take several other job offers in the escalating Vietnam War. Project Blue Book left a legacy of over 12,000 reported UFOs investigated of which 30 percent or over 4,000 cases, were classified as unknown.

Lieutenant Colonel Quintanilla retired from the Air Force after Project Blue Book was closed. Sometime afterwards, he was injured in a golf cart accident, sustaining a head injury that affected his health in later years. He died May 18, 1998, in San Antonio, Texas. Quintanilla left behind six children — Gene, Tessie, Karl, Nancy, Diane, and Bob — and several grandchildren.

Project Blue Book was often harshly criticized by those who argued it was not properly investigating UFO reports and was prone to improbable and/or untested post hoc explanations. After Blue Book folded, Quintanilla wrote a memoir, unpublished during his life and publicized in the 1990s by the National Institute for Discovery Science, which explained Quintanilla's perspective on Blue Book and UFOs.
