= 1952 Washington, D.C., UFO incident =

U.S. Capital flying saucer incidents on consecutive weekends

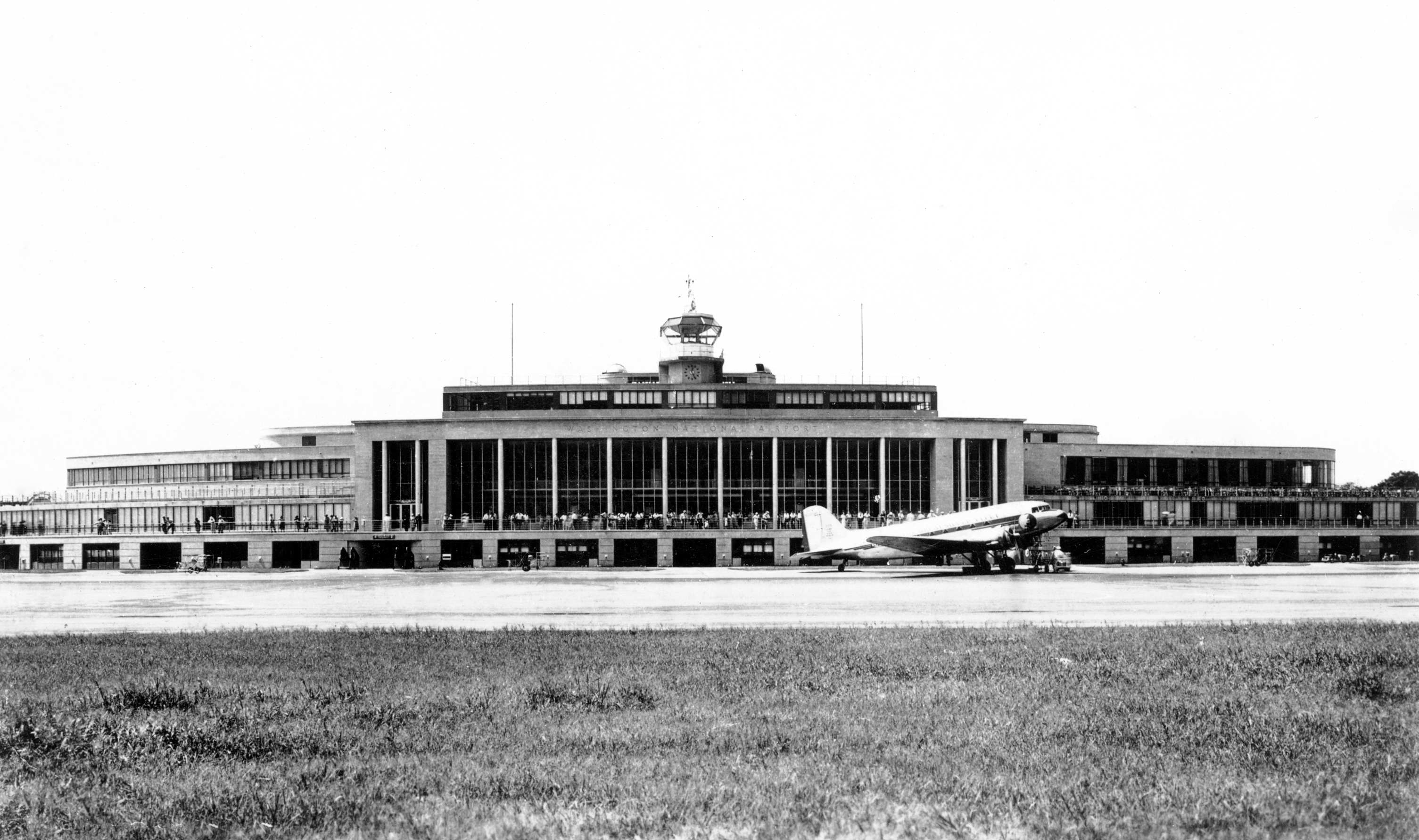
Washington National Airport terminal in 1944

From July 12 to 29, 1952, a series of unidentified flying object (UFO) sightings were reported in Washington, D.C., and later became known as the Washington flap, the Washington National Airport Sightings, or the Invasion of Washington. The most publicized sightings took place on consecutive weekends, July 18–19 and July 26–27. UFO historian Curtis Peebles called the incident "the climax of the 1952 (UFO) flap"—"Never before or after did Project Blue Book and the Air Force undergo such a tidal wave of (UFO) reports."

== 1952 UFO flap ==
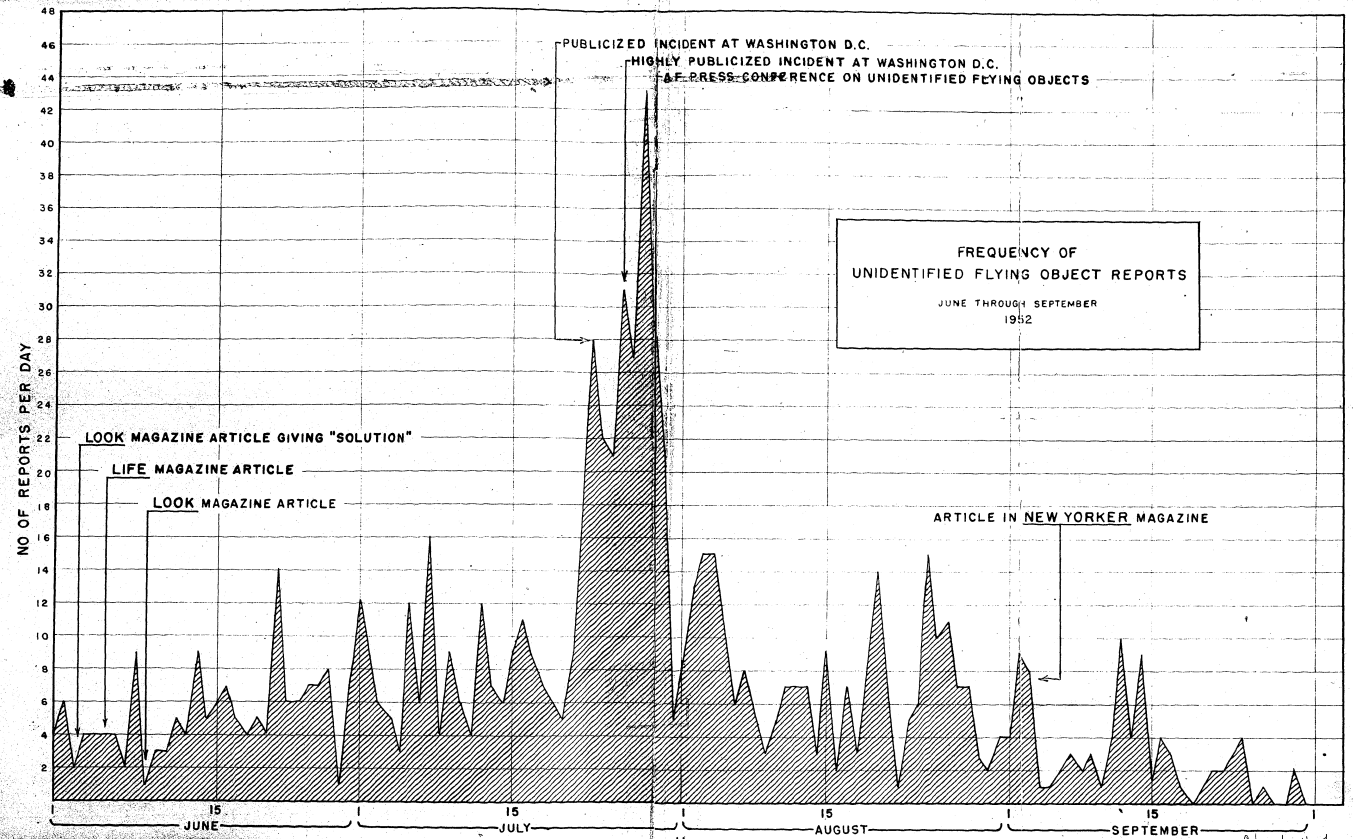
Reports peaked in late July.

The 1952 UFO flap was an unprecedented rash of media attention to unidentified flying object reports during the summer of 1952 that culminated with reports of sightings over Washington, D.C. In the four years prior, the US Air Force had chronicled a total of 615 UFO reports; during the 1952 flap, they received over 717 new reports. Project Blue Book director Edward J. Ruppelt later recalled: "During a six-month period in 1952... 148 of the nation's leading newspapers carried a total of over 16,000 items about flying saucers."

On April 3, the Associated Press reported on an upcoming story in Life magazine that would reveal the Air Force was taking a serious interest in flying saucers. The June edition of Look magazine featured a story where astrophysicist Donald Howard Menzel proposed flying saucers were optical mirages created by temperature inversions. American papers covered similar statements from French astronomer Ernest Esclangon who debunked the "flying saucer reports" by explaining they could not be supersonic craft because no sonic booms were reported.

On April 7, Life magazine, featuring Marilyn Monroe on its cover, published the Flying Saucer article under the title "Have We Visitors From Space?", becoming the most reputable outlet to seriously consider the possibility that flying saucer reports might be caused by extra-terrestrial spaceships. Publicity surrounding the piece is believed to have contributed to the subsequent wave of reports that summer.

== Sightings over Washington, D.C. ==
At the height of the UFO flap, there were UFOs reported at the nation's capital on two consecutive Saturday nights.

=== Night of July 19 ===
At 11:40 p.m. on Saturday, July 19, 1952, Edward Nugent, an air traffic controller at Washington National Airport, spotted seven objects on his radar. The objects were located 15 miles (24 km) south-southwest of the city; no known aircraft were in the area, and the objects were not following any established flight paths. Nugent's superior, Harry Barnes, a senior air-traffic controller at the airport, watched the objects on Nugent's radarscope. He later wrote: "We knew immediately that a very strange situation existed ... their movements were completely radical compared to those of ordinary aircraft."

Barnes had two controllers check Nugent's radar; they found that it was working normally. Barnes then called National Airport's radar-equipped control tower; the controllers there, Howard Cocklin and Joe Zacko, said that they also had unidentified blips on their radar screen, and saw a hovering "bright light" in the sky, which departed with incredible speed. Cocklin asked Zacko, "Did you see that? What the hell was that?"

At this point, other objects appeared in all sectors of the radarscope; when they moved over the White House and the United States Capitol, Barnes called Andrews Air Force Base, located 10 miles (16 km) from National Airport. Although Andrews reported that they had no unusual objects on their radar, an airman soon called the base's control tower to report the sighting of a strange object. Airman William Brady, who was in the tower, then saw an "object which appeared to be like an orange ball of fire, trailing a tail ... [it was] unlike anything I had ever seen before." As Brady tried to alert the other personnel in the tower, the strange object "took off at an unbelievable speed".

On one of National Airport's runways, S. C. Pierman, a Capital Airlines pilot, was waiting in the cockpit of his DC-4 for permission to take off. After spotting what he believed to be a meteor, he was told that the control tower's radar had detected unknown objects closing in on his position. Pierman observed six objects—"white, tailless, fast-moving lights"—over a 14-minute period. Pierman was in radio contact with Barnes during his sighting, and Barnes later related that "each sighting coincided with a pip we could see near his plane. When he reported that the light streaked off at a high speed, it disappeared on our scope."

Meanwhile, at Andrews Air Force Base, the control tower personnel were tracking on radar what some thought to be unknown objects, but others suspected, and in one instance were able to prove, were simply stars and meteors. However, Staff Sgt. Charles Davenport observed an orange-red light to the south; the light "would appear to stand still, then make an abrupt change in direction and altitude ... this happened several times." At one point both radar centers at National Airport and the radar at Andrews Air Force Base were tracking an object hovering over a radio beacon. The object vanished in all three radar centers at the same time.

At 3 a.m., shortly before two United States Air Force F-94 Starfire jet fighters from New Castle Air Force Base in Delaware arrived over Washington, all of the objects vanished from the radar at National Airport. However, when the jets ran low on fuel and left, the objects returned, which convinced Barnes that "the UFOs were monitoring radio traffic and behaving accordingly". The objects were last detected by radar at 5:30 a.m.

=== Publicity and Air Force reaction ===
The sightings of July 19–20, 1952, made front-page headlines in newspapers around the nation. A typical example was the headline from the Cedar Rapids Gazette in Iowa. It read "SAUCERS SWARM OVER CAPITAL" in large black type. By coincidence, USAF Captain Edward J. Ruppelt, the supervisor of the Air Force's Project Blue Book investigation into UFO sightings, was in Washington at the time. However, he did not learn about the sightings until Monday, July 21, when he read the headlines in a Washington-area newspaper. After talking with intelligence officers at the Pentagon about the sightings, Ruppelt spent several hours trying to obtain a staff car so he could travel around Washington to investigate the sightings, but was refused as only generals and senior colonels could use staff cars. He was told that he could rent a taxicab with his own money; by this point Ruppelt was so frustrated that he left Washington and flew back to Blue Book's headquarters at Wright-Patterson AFB in Dayton, Ohio. Upon returning to Dayton, Ruppelt spoke with an Air Force radar specialist, Captain Roy James, who felt that unusual weather conditions could have caused the unknown radar targets. On July 24, two Air Force colonels took off from Hamilton Air Force Base bound for Colorado Springs; they reported witnessing unidentified triangular objects.

=== Night of July 26 ===
At 8:15 p.m. on Saturday, July 26, 1952, a pilot and stewardess on a National Airlines flight into Washington observed some lights above their plane. Within minutes, both radar centers at National Airport, and the radar at Andrews AFB, were tracking more unknown objects. USAF master sergeant Charles E. Cummings visually observed the objects at Andrews, he later said that "these lights did not have the characteristics of shooting stars. There was [sic] no trails ... they traveled faster than any shooting star I have ever seen."

Meanwhile, Albert M. Chop, the press spokesman for Project Blue Book, arrived at National Airport and, due to security concerns, denied several reporters' requests to photograph the radar screens. He then joined the radar center personnel. By this time (9:30 p.m.) the radar center was detecting unknown objects in every sector. At times the objects traveled slowly; at other times they reversed direction and moved across the radarscope at speeds calculated at up to 7,000 mph (11,250 km/h). At 11:30 p.m., two U.S. Air Force F-94 Starfire jet fighters from New Castle Air Force Base in Delaware arrived over Washington. Captain John McHugo, the flight leader, was vectored towards the radar blips but saw nothing, despite repeated attempts. However, his wingman, Lieutenant William Patterson, did see four white "glows" and chased them. He told investigators that "I tried to make contact with the bogies below 1,000 feet," and that "I was at my maximum speed but...I ceased chasing them because I saw no chance of overtaking them." According to Albert Chop, when ground control asked Patterson "if he saw anything", Patterson replied "'I see them now and they're all around me. What should I do?'...And nobody answered, because we didn't know what to tell him."

After midnight on July 27, USAF Major Dewey Fournet, Project Blue Book's liaison at the Pentagon, and Lt. John Holcomb, a United States Navy radar specialist, arrived at the radar center at National Airport. During the night, Lieutenant Holcomb received a call from the Washington National Weather Station. They told him that a slight temperature inversion was present over the city, but Holcomb felt that the inversion was not "nearly strong enough to explain the 'good and solid' returns" on the radar scopes. Fournet relayed that all those present in the radar room were convinced that the targets were most likely caused by solid metallic objects. There had been weather targets on the scope too, he said, but this was a common occurrence and the controllers "were paying no attention to them". Two more F-94s from New Castle Air Force Base were scrambled during the night. One pilot saw nothing unusual; the other pilot saw a white light which "vanished" when he moved towards it. Civilian aircraft also reported glowing objects that corresponded to radar blips seen by Andrews radar operators. As on July 20, the sightings and unknown radar returns ended at sunrise.

== Air Force explanation ==
Maj. Gen. John A. Samford's Statement on Flying Saucers

Air Force Major Generals John Samford, USAF Director of Intelligence, and Roger M. Ramey, USAF Director of Operations, held a well-attended press conference at the Pentagon on July 29, 1952. In his opening comments, Samford noted that, out of the hundreds of UFO reports in recent years investigated by the Air Force, there was "a certain percentage of this volume of reports that have been made by credible observers of relatively incredible things" but that none of them posed any national security threat. At the event, Samford stated that the visual sightings over Washington could be explained as misidentified aerial phenomena such as stars or meteors, and unknown radar targets could be explained by temperature inversion, which was present in the air over Washington on both nights the radar returns were reported. In addition, Samford stated that the unknown radar contacts were not caused by solid material objects, and therefore posed no threat to national security. In response to a question as to whether the Air Force had recorded similar UFO radar contacts prior to the Washington incident, Samford said that there had been "hundreds" of such contacts where Air Force fighter interceptions had taken place, but stated that they were all "fruitless". It was the largest Pentagon press conference since World War II. Press stories called Samford and Ramey the Air Force's two top UFO experts.

Among the witnesses who supported Samford's explanation was the crew of a B-25 bomber, which had been flying over Washington during the sightings of July 26–27. The bomber was vectored several times by National Airport over unknown targets on the airport's radarscopes, yet the crew could see nothing unusual. Finally, as a crew member related, "the radar had a target which turned out to be the Wilson Lines steamboat trip to Mount Vernon... the radar was sure as hell picking up the steamboat." Air Force Captain Harold May was in the radar center at Andrews AFB during the sightings of July 19–20. Upon hearing that National Airport's radar had picked up an unknown object heading in his direction, May stepped outside and saw "a light that was changing from red to orange to green to red again...at times it dipped suddenly and appeared to lose altitude." However, May eventually concluded that he was simply seeing a star that was distorted by the atmosphere, and that its "movement" was an illusion. At 3 a.m. on July 27, an Eastern Airlines flight over Washington was told that an unknown object was in its vicinity; the crew could see nothing unusual. When they were told that the object had moved directly behind their plane, they began a sharp turn to try to see the object, but were told by National Airport's radar center that the object had "disappeared" when they began their turn.

At the request of the Air Force, the CAA's Technical Development and Evaluation Center did an analysis of the radar sightings. Their conclusion was that "a temperature inversion had been indicated in almost every instance when the unidentified radar targets or visual objects had been reported." Project Blue Book would eventually label the unknown Washington radar blips as false images caused by temperature inversion, and the visual sightings as misidentified meteors, stars, and city lights. In later years two prominent UFO skeptics, Donald Menzel, an astronomer at Harvard University, and Philip Klass, a senior editor for Aviation Week magazine, would also argue in favor of the temperature inversion/mirage hypothesis. In 2002 Klass told a reporter that "radar technology in 1952 wasn't sophisticated enough to filter out many ordinary objects, such as flocks of birds, weather balloons, or temperature inversions." The reporter added that "UFO proponents argue that even then seasoned controllers could differentiate between spurious targets and solid, metallic objects. Klass disagrees. It may be that 'we had two dumb controllers at National Airport on those nights'...[Klass] added that the introduction of digital filters in the 1970s led to a steep decline in UFO sightings on radar."

In his 1965 book Anatomy of a Phenomenon, UFO researcher Jacques Vallée lists the 1952 Washington incident as an example of a widely discussed case which is "rather poor" and "in [UFO researchers'] files would be considered second-rate".

=== Criticisms ===
In his book, The Report On Unidentified Flying Objects, author Edward J. Ruppelt wrote that radar and control tower personnel he spoke to, as well as some Air Force officers, disagreed with the Air Force's explanation.

Michael Wertheimer, a researcher for the government-funded Condon Report, investigated the case in 1966, and stated that radar witnesses still disputed the Air Force explanation.

Former radar controller Howard Cocklin told the Washington Post in 2002 that he was still convinced that he saw an object, stating that "I saw it on the [radar] screen and out the window" over Washington National Airport."

== White House concern and CIA interest ==
The sightings of July 26–27 also made front-page headlines, and led President Harry Truman to have his air force aide call Ruppelt and ask for an explanation of the sightings and unknown radar returns. Truman listened to the conversation between the two men on a separate phone, but did not ask questions himself. Ruppelt, remembering the conversation he had with Captain James, told the president's assistant that the sightings might have been caused by a temperature inversion, in which a layer of warm, moist air covers a layer of cool, dry air closer to the ground. This condition can cause radar signals to bend and give false returns. However, Ruppelt had not yet interviewed any of the witnesses or conducted a formal investigation.

CIA historian Gerald Haines, in his 1997 history of the CIA's involvement with UFOs, also mentions Truman's concern. "A massive buildup of sightings over the United States in 1952, especially in July, alarmed the Truman administration. On 19 and 20 July, radar scopes at Washington National Airport and Andrews Air Force Base tracked mysterious blips. On 27 July, the blips reappeared." The CIA would react to the 1952 wave of UFO reports by "forming a special study group within the Office of Scientific Intelligence (OSI) and Office of Current Intelligence (OCI) to review the situation. Edward Tauss reported for the group that most UFO sightings could be easily explained. Nonetheless, he recommended that the Agency continue monitoring the problem." The CIA's concern with the issue would lead to the creation, in January 1953, of the Robertson Panel.

== The Robertson Panel ==
The extremely high numbers of UFO reports in 1952 disturbed both the Air Force and the Central Intelligence Agency (CIA). Both groups felt that an enemy nation could deliberately flood the U.S. with false UFO reports, causing mass panic and allowing them to launch a sneak attack. On September 24, 1952, the CIA's Office of Scientific Intelligence (OSI) sent a memorandum to Walter B. Smith, the CIA's Director. The memo stated that "the flying saucer situation ... [has] national security implications ... [in] the public concern with the phenomena ... lies the potential for the touching-off of mass hysteria and panic."

The result of this memorandum was the creation in January 1953 of the Robertson Panel. Howard P. Robertson, a physicist, chaired the panel, which consisted of prominent scientists and which spent four days examining the "best" UFO cases collected by Project Blue Book. The panel dismissed nearly all of the UFO cases it examined as not representing anything unusual or threatening to national security. In the panel's controversial estimate, the Air Force and Project Blue Book needed to spend less time analyzing and studying UFO reports and more time publicly debunking them. The panel recommended that the Air Force and Project Blue Book should take steps to "strip the Unidentified Flying Objects of the special status they have been given and the aura of mystery they have unfortunately acquired." Following the panel's recommendation, Project Blue Book would rarely publicize any UFO case that it had not labeled as "solved"; unsolved cases were rarely mentioned by the Air Force.

== In popular culture ==
- The tenth and final episode of the first season of the 2019 History Channel television series Project Blue Book is titled "The Washington Merry-Go-Round". It's based on the 1952 Washington, DC UFO incident.
- Several episodes of the 2021 Netflix series Top Secret UFO Projects Declassified refer to the 1952 Washington, DC UFO incident, including the first episode "Project Blue Book Unknown", which reenacts the incident with CGI and plays archival footage with several former witnesses.
