= Robert Friend =

Robert Friend may refer to

- Robert Friend (poet) (1913–1998), American poet
- Robert Friend (pilot) (1920–2019), US Air Force lieutenant colonel and Tuskegee Airman
- Bob Friend (newscaster) (1938–2008), British journalist and one of the original news anchors for the Sky News channel
