= J. Allen Hynek =

American astronomer and ufologist (1910–1986)

Josef Allen Hynek
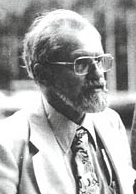
- Born: May 1, 1910; Chicago, Illinois, U.S.
- Died: April 27, 1986 (aged 75); Scottsdale, Arizona, U.S.
- Spouses: Martha Doone Alexander (m. 1932; div. 1939) Mimi Curtis (m. 1942)
- Children: 5, including Joel

Academic background
- Education: University of Chicago (BS, PhD)
- Doctoral advisor: Otto Struve; William Wilson Morgan
- Other advisor: Fred Whipple

Academic work
- Discipline: Astrophysics; Ufology
- Institutions: The Ohio State University; Smithsonian Astrophysical Observatory; Northwestern University; CUFOS

Josef Allen Hynek (May 1, 1910 – April 27, 1986) was an American astronomer, professor, and ufologist. He is perhaps best remembered for his UFO research. Hynek acted as scientific advisor to UFO studies undertaken by the U.S. Air Force under three projects: Project Sign (1947–1949), Project Grudge (1949–1951) and Project Blue Book (1952–1969). In later years, he conducted his own independent UFO research, developing the "Close Encounter" classification system. He was among the first people to conduct scientific analysis of reports and especially of trace evidence purportedly left by UFOs.

== Early life ==
Hynek was born in Chicago to Czech parents on May 1, 1910. In 1931, Hynek received a Bachelor of Science degree from the University of Chicago. In 1935, he completed his PhD in astrophysics at Yerkes Observatory of the Department of Astronomy and Astrophysics at the University of Chicago. His thesis advisors were Otto Struve and William Wilson Morgan. Hynek joined the Department of Physics and Astronomy at The Ohio State University in 1936. He wrote with George Gamow on the origin of the Solar System in 1945. He specialized in the study of stellar evolution and in the identification of spectroscopic binary stars.

== Career ==
During World War II, Hynek was a civilian scientist at the Johns Hopkins Applied Physics Laboratory, where he helped to develop the United States Navy's radio proximity fuze. After the war, Hynek returned to the Department of Physics and Astronomy at Ohio State, rising to full professor in 1950. In 1953, Hynek submitted a report on the fluctuations in the brightness and color of starlight and daylight, with an emphasis on daytime observations.

In 1956, Hynek left to join Fred Whipple, the Harvard astronomer, at the Smithsonian Astrophysical Observatory, which had combined with the Harvard Observatory at Harvard. Hynek had the assignment of directing the tracking of an American space satellite, a project for the International Geophysical Year in 1956 and thereafter. In addition to over 200 teams of amateur scientists around the world that were part of Operation Moonwatch, there were also 12 photographic Baker-Nunn stations. A special camera was devised for the task and a prototype was built and tested and then stripped apart again when, on October 4, 1957, the Soviet Union launched its first satellite, Sputnik 1. After completing his work on the satellite program, Hynek went back to teaching, taking the position of professor and chairman of the astronomy department at Northwestern University in 1960 and worked there until his retirement in 1978.

== Evolution of opinion on UFOs ==
=== Skepticism ===
In response to numerous reports of "flying saucers", the United States Air Force established Project Sign in 1948 to examine sightings of unidentified flying objects. Hynek was contacted to act as a scientific consultant to Project Sign. He studied UFO reports and decided whether the phenomena described therein suggested known astronomical objects. When Project Sign hired Hynek, he was skeptical of UFO reports. Hynek suspected that they were made by unreliable witnesses, or by persons who had misidentified man-made or natural objects. In 1948, Hynek said that "the whole subject seems utterly ridiculous", and described it as a fad that would soon pass. In his 1977 book, Hynek said that he enjoyed his role as a debunker for the Air Force. He also said that debunking was what the Air Force expected of him.

=== Change of opinion ===
In April 1953, Hynek wrote a report for the Journal of the Optical Society of America titled "Unusual Aerial Phenomena", which contained one of his best-known statements:

Ridicule is not part of the scientific method, and people should not be taught that it is. The steady flow of reports, often made in concert by reliable observers, raises questions of scientific obligation and responsibility. Is there ... any residue that is worthy of scientific attention? Or, if there isn't, does not an obligation exist to say so to the public—not in words of open ridicule but seriously, to keep faith with the trust the public places in science and scientists?

In 1953, Hynek was an associate member of the Robertson Panel, which concluded that there was nothing anomalous about UFOs, and that a public relations campaign should be undertaken to debunk the subject and reduce public interest. Hynek would later lament that the Robertson Panel had helped make UFOs a disreputable field of study. As UFO reports continued to be made, some of the testimonies, especially by military pilots and police officers, were deeply puzzling to Hynek. He once said, "As a scientist I must be mindful of the lessons of the past; all too often it has happened that matters of great value to science were overlooked because the new phenomenon did not fit the accepted scientific outlook of the time."

In a 1985 interview, when asked what caused his change of opinion, Hynek responded, "Two things, really. One was the completely negative and unyielding attitude of the Air Force. They wouldn't give UFOs the chance of existing, even if they were flying up and down the street in broad daylight. Everything had to have an explanation. I began to resent that, even though I basically felt the same way, because I still thought they weren't going about it in the right way. You can't assume that everything is black no matter what. Secondly, the caliber of the witnesses began to trouble me. Quite a few instances were reported by military pilots, for example, and I knew them to be fairly well-trained, so this is when I first began to think that, well, maybe there was something to all this."

Hynek remained with Project Sign after it became Project Grudge (though he was far less involved in Grudge than he had been in Sign). Project Grudge was replaced with Project Blue Book in early 1952, and Hynek remained as scientific consultant. Air Force Captain Edward J. Ruppelt, Blue Book's first director, held Hynek in high regard: "Dr. Hynek was one of the most impressive scientists I met while working on the UFO project, and I met a good many. He didn't do two things that some of them did: give you the answer before he knew the question; or immediately begin to expound on his accomplishments in the field of science." Though Hynek thought Ruppelt was a capable director who steered Project Blue Book in the right direction, Ruppelt headed Blue Book for only a few years. Hynek has also stated his opinion that after Ruppelt's departure, Project Blue Book was little more than a public relations exercise, further noting that little or no research was undertaken using the scientific method.

=== Turnaround ===
External videos
- UFO: Friend, Foe, or Fantasy? (May 10, 1966) Walter Cronkite reporting on the Michigan sightings
- Hynek on Merv Griffin (July 13, 1966)

Hynek began occasionally disagreeing publicly with the conclusions of Blue Book. By the early 1960s—after about a decade and a half of study—Clark writes that "Hynek's apparent turnaround on the UFO question was an open secret." Only after Blue Book was formally dissolved did Hynek speak more openly about his "turnaround". Hynek speculated that his personality was a factor in the Air Force keeping him on as a consultant for over two decades.

Some other ufologists thought that Hynek was being disingenuous or even duplicitous in his turnaround. Physicist James E. McDonald, for example, wrote to Hynek in 1970, castigating him for what McDonald saw as his lapses, and suggesting that, when evaluated by later generations, retired Marine Corps Major Donald E. Keyhoe would be regarded as a more objective, honest, and scientific ufologist.

It was during the late stages of Blue Book in the 1960s that Hynek began speaking openly about his disagreements and disappointments with the Air Force. Among the cases about which he openly dissented with the Air Force were the highly publicized Portage County UFO chase, in which several police officers chased a UFO for half an hour, and the encounter of Lonnie Zamora, a police officer who reported an encounter with a metallic, egg-shaped aircraft near Socorro, New Mexico. In 1964, Hynek appeared on the television program To Tell the Truth.

External videos
- Footage of the Hynek press conference

In late March 1966, in Dexter, Michigan, two days of mass UFO sightings were reported, and received significant publicity. After studying the reports, Hynek offered a provisional hypothesis for some of the sightings: a few of about 100 witnesses had mistaken swamp gas for something more spectacular. At the press conference where he made his announcement, Hynek repeatedly and strenuously stated that swamp gas was a plausible explanation for only a portion of the Michigan UFO reports, and certainly not for UFO reports in general. Much to his chagrin, Hynek's qualifications of his hypothesis were largely overlooked, and the term "swamp gas" was repeated ad infinitum in relation to UFO reports. The explanation was subject to national derision.

In his reply dated October 7, 1968, to a request for scientific recommendations regarding Blue Book from Colonel Raymond Sleeper, commander of the USAF Foreign Technology Division, Hynek noted that Blue Book suffered from numerous procedural problems and a lack of resources, which rendered its efforts "totally inadequate". Hynek also noted that one wag had bestowed upon Blue Book the epithet of "Society for the Explanation of the Uninvestigated".

== Center for UFO Studies (CUFOS) ==
Hynek was the founder and first head of the Center for UFO Studies (CUFOS). Founded in 1973 in Evanston, Illinois (but now based in Chicago), CUFOS advocates for scientific analysis of UFO cases. CUFOS's extensive archives include valuable files from civilian research groups such as NICAP, one of the most popular UFO research groups of the 1950s and 1960s.

== Speech before the United Nations ==
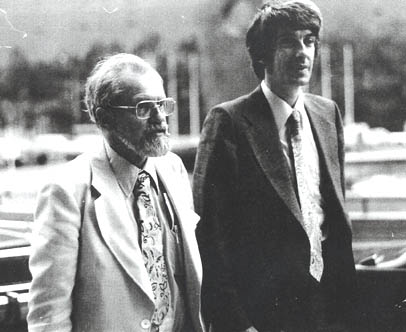
Hynek (left) and Jacques Vallée

In November 1978, Hynek presented a statement on UFOs before the United Nations General Assembly's Special Political Committee on behalf of himself, Jacques Vallée, and Claude Poher. The speech was prepared and approved by the three authors. Their objective was to initiate a centralized, United Nations authority on UFOs.

== UFO origin hypotheses ==
At the MUFON annual symposium in 1973, held in Akron, Ohio, Hynek first expressed his doubts regarding the extraterrestrial (formerly interplanetary or intergalactic) hypothesis, in a speech titled "The Embarrassment of the Riches". He was aware that the number of UFO sightings was much higher than was reflected in the Project Blue Book statistics, stating: "A few good sightings a year, over the world, would bolster the extraterrestrial hypothesis—but many thousands every year? From remote regions of space? And to what purpose? To scare us by stopping cars, and disturbing animals, and puzzling us with their seemingly pointless antics?"

If not publicly, Hynek had been expressing his doubts about the extraterrestrial spacecraft hypothesis to his closest colleagues for years prior to that 1973 symposium. Vallee's journal entry of August 2, 1967, recounts a conversation with Hynek over lunch that day during which, "We turned to the subject of hypotheses. Hynek would like to write a set of axioms from which he would derive the whole study of UFOs. ... Third axiom: The physical plane is not the only level of existence. The hermeticists speak of an 'astral plane.' The spiritists talk about materializations ... ghosts that go through walls. Who knows if UFOs are not observational devices that are materialized into our world by the denizens of another?"

In a paper presented to the Joint Symposium of the American Institute of Aeronautics & Astronautics in Los Angeles in 1975, he wrote, "If you object, I ask you to explain—quantitatively, not qualitatively—the reported phenomena of materialization and dematerialization, of shape changes, of the noiseless hovering in the Earth's gravitational field, accelerations that—for an appreciable mass—require energy sources far beyond present capabilities—even theoretical capabilities, the well-known and often reported E-M (electro-magnetic interference) effect, the psychic effects on percipients, including purported telepathic communications."

In 1977, at the First International UFO Congress in Chicago, Hynek presented his thoughts in his speech "What I Really Believe About UFOs". "I do believe", he said, "that the UFO phenomenon as a whole is real, but I do not mean necessarily that it's just one thing. We must ask whether the diversity of observed UFOs ... all spring from the same basic source, as do weather phenomena, which all originate in the atmosphere", or whether they differ "as a rain shower differs from a meteor, which in turn differs from a cosmic-ray shower." We must not ask, Hynek said, simply which hypothesis can explain the most facts, but rather which hypothesis can explain the most puzzling facts.

Regarding hypotheses of extraterrestrial intelligence (ETI) and extradimensional intelligence (EDI), Hynek continued, "There is sufficient evidence to defend both". As evidence for the ETI hypothesis, he mentioned the cases involving radar as good evidence of something solid, as well as the cases of physical evidence. Then he turned to defending the EDI hypothesis: in addition to the observations of materialization and dematerialization, he cited the "poltergeist" phenomenon experienced by some people after a close encounter; the photographs of UFOs, sometimes in only one frame, and not seen by witnesses; the changing of form in front of witnesses; the puzzling question of telepathic communication; that in close encounters of the third kind, the creatures seem to be at home in Earth's gravity and atmosphere; the sudden stillness in the presence of the craft; levitation of cars or people; and the development by some of psychic abilities after an encounter. "Do we have two aspects of one phenomenon or two different sets of phenomena?" Hynek asked.

Hynek introduced a third hypothesis. He said: "I hold it entirely possible that a technology exists, which encompasses both the physical and the psychic, the material and the mental. There are stars that are millions of years older than the sun. There may be a civilization that is millions of years more advanced than man's. We have gone from Kitty Hawk to the moon in some seventy years, but it's possible that a million-year-old civilization may know something that we don't ... I hypothesize an 'M&M' technology encompassing the mental and material realms. The psychic realms, so mysterious to us today, may be an ordinary part of an advanced technology." In Vallee's foreword to his 1992 collection of journal entries from 1957 to 1969, he writes that Hynek, looking far less than millions of years into the future, "liked to remind us that beyond today's science there would be a twenty-first century science that would have to take into account phenomena that seemed paranormal to us simply because of our parochial mental attitudes and the limitations of what he aptly called our cultural provincialism."

In Hynek and Vallee's 1975 book The Edge of Reality, Hynek published a stereoscopic photograph of a UFO he took during a flight. According to the book, the object stayed in sight long enough for Hynek to unpack his camera from his luggage and take two exposures. UFO researcher Robert Sheaffer writes in his book Psychic Vibrations that Hynek seemed to have forgotten the photographs when he later told a reporter for The Globe and Mail that he had never seen a UFO. The article states that in all the years he had been looking upward, Hynek "has never seen 'what I would so dearly love to see. Oh, the subject has been so ridiculed that I would never report a UFO even if I did see one—not without a witness.'" Nevertheless, Hynek's role in ufology took a heavy toll on his professional reputation, as noted in a March 1968 journal entry in Vallee (1992): "[Hynek's] colleagues' attitude towards him is changing to the point of contempt. ... He is not taken seriously among astronomers [anymore]. ... At the recent ceremony for the tenth anniversary of Sputnik they could not avoid inviting him to speak, but [they] told him to be sure not to mention UFOs."

== Close encounter ==
In his first book, Hynek published the "close encounter" scale that he had developed to better catalog UFO reports. Hynek was later a consultant to Columbia Pictures and Steven Spielberg for the popular 1977 UFO movie Close Encounters of the Third Kind, named after a level of Hynek's scale. He made a cameo appearance in the film. At the end of the film, after the abducted World War II fighter pilots disembark from the "mother ship", he can be seen, bearded and with pipe in mouth, stepping forward to view the spectacle.

== Controversies and criticisms ==
Hynek's most prolific public critic was acclaimed aerospace journalist and UFO researcher Philip J. Klass. In his book UFOs: The Public Deceived, the chapter on "Eyewitness Unreliability" begins (p. 81) with criticism of Hynek's insistence "for many years that no useful insights could be gained from the study of UFO reports that proved to be IFOs" (i.e., subsequently identified), as Hynek reiterated to a congressional committee in 1968: "These have little scientific value ... ; it matters not whether 100 or 100,000 people fail to identify [for example] an artificial satellite or a high–altitude balloon." Klass argues that "UFO reports that prove to be IFOs show that intelligent people, including pilots, scientists, and law–enforcement officers, unwittingly embellish their accounts with inaccurate details and seeming cause–effects that are really unrelated. It follows logically that similar inaccuracies in other UFO reports may prevent their explanations." In a later chapter (p. 287), he illustrates how "when Hynek speaks to those inclined to believe in UFOs and other paranormal claims, he is much more candid" about his mystical worldview. He quotes Hynek as telling the Spiritual Frontiers Fellowship, "I can feel freer [here] to discuss the more esoteric aspects of the subject of UFOs. ... You have an awareness of the possibilities that the solely materialistically oriented person, like scientists in general, do not have. Talking to them about certain subjects would be like trying to explain calculus to a kindergarten student." Klass then (pp. 287–288) cites the Center for UFO Studies' failure to fulfill Hynek's expectation of promptly and scientifically establishing UFO reality. From Hynek's article, "The UFO Gap", in the December 1967 issue of Playboy: "If UFOs ... actually exist, we would have photographs, movies, spectrograms, plaster casts of indentations (if a landing occurs) and detailed measurements ... of brightness, speeds, and so on within a year of the initiation of such a no–nonsense program. ... [But if not] this, in itself, would be of great negative significance." Klass concludes, "Nearly a decade has now passed since CUFOS was created. ... Today all that CUFOS has to show for this effort are several thousand additional [similar] reports ... plus a growing number of bizarre tales of 'occupants' and 'abductions.' ... Thus, this decade of CUFOS effort has provided what Hynek in 1967 called evidence of 'great negative significance,' that is, that there is no mysterious UFO phenomenon." (emphasis in original).

Robert Sheaffer, a Klass protégé who studied astronomy under (and somewhat befriended) Prof. Hynek at Northwestern University, accuses Hynek of gullibility on his Bad UFOs blog as well as in his 1998 book UFO Sightings: The Evidence and additional writings. While still a student in 1970, Sheaffer was afforded the opportunity to preview a chapter in Hynek's first book–in–progress, and their back–and–forth (along with an appraisal by Philip Klass of that correspondence) is among the material posted in the "Historical Documents" section of Sheaffer's UFO–related website, as is Sheaffer's commentary on Hynek's April 1969 Northwestern freshman orientation lecture on UFOs. Sheaffer's review of the Proceedings of the 1976 CUFOS Conference includes, "Having swallowed [one particular presenter's] tales with no apparent difficulty, [Hynek's CUFOS is] about ready for sightings of the Tooth Fairy. ... Papers that are generally skeptical about UFOs, or even those that shoot down faulty UFO cases, are not represented here" (emphasis in original). His review of Hynek and Vallee's Edge of Reality ("the authors have gleefully swallowed a dismally high number of UFO hoaxes") was followed by replies from both authors and by Sheaffer's response in which he thanks Hynek for "a reply that nicely illustrates all of my principal criticisms of his book", including "reckless errors of fact", adding that Hynek's "'scientific' UFO Center operates on the principle that 'responsible criticism does not exist.'" In UFO Sightings: The Evidence, Sheaffer further concludes that ufology, as practiced by Hynek (and others), is "a powerful social movement [that is] fundamentally a reaction against science and reason" (emphasis in original).

Andrew Fraknoi, Executive Director of the Astronomical Society of the Pacific from 1978 to 1992, in a 1981 letter to Science Digest—speaking strictly for himself and not ASP—declined the magazine's invitation to offer a nomination for its Cutty Sark Science Award. An excerpt: "While I think such an award is an excellent idea, I have chosen not to participate in the process because of your inclusion of Dr. Allen Hynek on your panel of judges. I feel it demeans the entire process ... to have as one of the judges a man who has been one of the loudest and [most] exploitative exponents of pseudo–science in this country" (emphasis in original).

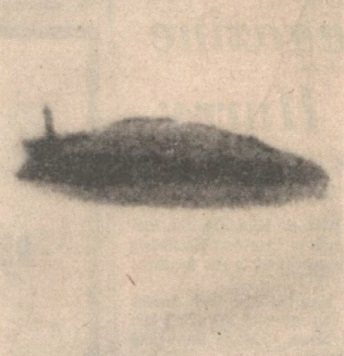
The Jaroslaw "hamburger" UFO (AP Wirephoto, January 10, 1967)

Researcher Curt Collins, in a comprehensive weblog titled "Dr. Hynek and the UFO Photo Investigation of 1967", chronicles Hynek's role as an "[unwitting] secondary dupe" in fanning the flames of what would become an indelible UFO–photo case—thanks in large part to the Associated Press and the CBS Evening News with Walter Cronkite—involving several Polaroid instant photographs of a "hamburger"–shaped object taken on January 9, 1967, by Michigan teenager Grant Jaroslaw who, along with his brother Dan, were the two lone "witnesses". Hynek was unfortunately denied the original prints by the family, and it would be nine years before a letter of confession from the brothers would ultimately convince him of their hoax. His premature endorsements (though hedged) led to newspaper headlines across the country such as "Expert Sees 'No Hoax' in Boys' UFO Photos" and "Saucers In Photo Real? UFO Expert Says 'Yes.'" Apparently unbeknownst to Hynek at the time—despite an article widely disseminated by the Associated Press nearly a week prior to his initial endorsements—a local newspaper reporter, being shown the original prints within hours of the incident and observing Polaroid's sequential serial numbers on the reverse sides, noted that the photographs' sequencing was incompatible with the brothers' chronology of events.

Author John Franch, in an article titled "The Secret Life of J. Allen Hynek", disputes the "legend" that "Hynek was a [scientifically oriented] skeptic before becoming an outspoken Ufologist." He notes that "Since his teens Hynek had been an enthusiastic though closeted student of the occult" with "a particular fondness for the writings of the Rosicrucian secret societies, with their tantalizing promises of hidden ancient knowledge, and those of the so–called hermetic philosophers, especially Rudolf Steiner", and "even endorsed alleged instances of 'psychic surgery' and 'psychic photography.'" For these and other reasons, Franch asserts that Hynek's initial "skeptical attitude" toward UFO reality "was in fact a façade for public consumption."

== Personal life ==
Hynek and his second wife, Miriam Curtis Hynek, had five children. Hynek's son Joel Hynek is an Oscar-winning visual effects supervisor. He oversaw the design of the camouflage effect for the movie Predator, and won the Best Visual Effects Oscar for his work on What Dreams May Come.

In 2019, the History Channel created and aired a highly fictionalized TV show based on Hynek UFO research and the organization he worked for dubbed Project Blue Book.

On April 27, 1986, Hynek died of a malignant brain tumor, at Memorial Hospital in Scottsdale, Arizona. He was 75 years old.

== Books ==
- The Close Encounters Man: How One Man Made the World Believe in UFOs (2017) ISBN 978-0-06-248417-8
- The UFO Experience: A Scientific inquiry (1972) ISBN 978-1-56924-782-2
- The Edge of Reality: A Progress Report on the Unidentified Flying Objects, with Jacques Vallée (1975) ISBN 978-0-8092-8150-3
- The Hynek UFO Report (1977) ISBN 0-440-19201-3
- Night Siege: The Hudson Valley UFO Sightings, with Philip Imbrogno and Bob Pratt (1987) ISBN 978-0-345-34213-3

== Bibliography ==
- Fuller, Curtis (1980). Proceedings of the First International UFO Congress. New York: Warner Books.
- Schneidman; Daniels (1987), The UFO Phenomenon, Mysteries of the Unknown, Time-Life Books, ISBN 0-8094-6324-5
- Stringfield, Leonard (1977). Situation Red. Fawcett Crest Books. ISBN 0-449-23654-4.
