= International UFO Congress =

American ufology organization located in Arizona

The International UFO Congress is an annual conference established in 1991 in Arizona dedicated to the dissemination of information related to many aspects of ufology. Previously held in Laughlin, Nevada, the conference moved to the Phoenix, Arizona area in 2011. It features presentations given by authors, researchers, experts, enthusiasts, and those who claim to have witnessed paranormal or anomalous phenomena from all over the world. This week-long event usually has over thirty speakers, a film festival, vendors, and "experiencer" and findings-discussion sessions. Topics generally covered are alien abduction, UFO sightings, UFO crashes, crop circles, paranormal experiences, and government conspiracy. Previous speakers include Richard Dolan, Travis Walton, George Knapp, Yvonne Smith, Kathleen Marden, Jeremy Corbell, David Childress, Kevin Day and Alejandro Rojas among others.

== Congress history ==
The International UFO Congress was owned by the Brown family, who in 2010 sold the conference to Open Minds Production. In 2017, it once again changed hands and is now owned by Out of This World Media and Events Incorporated.
