= Project Sign =

U.S. Air Force study of UFOs (1948)

Project Sign report

Project Sign or Project Saucer was an official U.S. government study of unidentified flying objects (UFOs) undertaken by the United States Air Force (USAF) and active for most of 1948. It was the precursor to Project Grudge.

== History ==
The project was established in 1948 by Air Force General Nathan Farragut Twining, head of the Air Technical Service Command, and was initially named Project SAUCER. The goal of the project was to collect, evaluate, and distribute within the government all information relating to UFO sightings, on the premise that they might represent a national security concern.

On April 27, 1949, the U.S. Air Force publicly released a paper prepared by the Intelligence Division of the Air Materiel Command at Wright-Patterson Field, Ohio. The paper stated that while some UFOs appeared to represent actual aircraft, there was not enough data to determine their origin. Almost all cases were explained by ordinary causes, but the report recommended a continuation of the investigation of all sightings.

Project Sign was first asserted in the 1956 book The Report on Unidentified Flying Objects by retired Air Force Captain Edward J. Ruppelt, who later directed Project Blue Book. In this publication, he also claimed that Sign had produced a "Top Secret Estimate of the Situation" which "concluded UFOs were real". No copy of this document or any other corroboration of Ruppelt's claim has been produced, and Popular Mechanics called the report "probably more mythological than real". On January 18, 1966, in a Hearing of the Eighty-ninth Congress, Second Session, L. Mendel Rivers asserted no such Estimate had ever existed.

Project Sign was followed by Project Grudge after a conclusion was reached that UFO reports could be exploited by a foreign power to induce panic in the population and were therefore a military issue in the post-World War II, Cold War climate. Project Grudge came to the conclusion (page vi) that UFO reports were the result of "A. Misidentifications of various conventional objects, B. A mild form of mass-hysteria and war nerves, C. Individuals who fabricate such reports to perpetuate a hoax or to seek publicity, and D. Psychopathological persons."

== Caldwell investigation ==
In May 1949, officers of Project Sign received a letter from the shareholder of an aeronautical company, who explained that the enterprise had been building aircraft similar to the "flying saucers" which were then a popular topic in the press. This was during the UFO craze following Kenneth Arnold's report of seeing UFOs over Mount Rainier and the Roswell Incident that occurred shortly thereafter. The Air Force had canvassed for reports of flying saucers, and the shareholder apparently felt that inventor Jonathan Edward Caldwell's disk-rotor might explain them.

Tracking down the leads, the team, accompanied by the Maryland Police, visited an abandoned farm in Glen Burnie, Maryland (outside Baltimore), where the damaged remains of Caldwell's disk-rotor aircraft were discovered. They also tracked down one of the former test pilots of the machine who told them the story of the attempted flight in 1937–8. The team reported that the prototypes could not be responsible for the "flying saucer" reports that were being received from all around the country.

Photographs of the broken disk-rotor machine continue to appear in UFOs books to this day. They were often described as "crashed" flying saucers in earlier works, claiming it was one more example of the USAF being in possession of such vehicles. More recently, they have been connected to claims that the Nazis had built working flying saucers late in the war, lumped together with other disk-shaped aircraft like the Avrocar, Sack AS-6, and Vought V-173, in an effort to demonstrate that such aircraft were both possible and well-researched.

== See also ==
- Project Grudge
- Project Blue Book
- Project Magnet

Preceded by None	US military projects investigating the UFO phenomenon	Succeeded by Project Grudge
