= Robert Friend (pilot) =

Tuskegee airman and leader of Project Blue Book (1920–2019)

Lieutenant Colonel Robert Friend
- Born: Robert Jones Friend; February 29, 1920; Columbia, South Carolina, U.S.
- Died: June 21, 2019 (aged 99); Long Beach, California, U.S.
- Spouses: Doris “Bunny” Goodwin (divorced); Kathryn Ann Holland (divorced); Anna Rice (m. 1959; died 2010)
- Children: 8
- Military career
- Allegiance: United States of America
- Branch: United States Army Air Force
- Service years: 1943-1971
- Rank: Lieutenant colonel
- Nickname: Bob
- Unit: 332nd Fighter Group
- Awards: Distinguished Flying Crosses (2); Bronze Star; Presidential Unit Citation; 3 Distinguished Service Medals; Air Medal; Congressional Gold Medal awarded to the Tuskegee Airmen

Robert Jones Friend (February 29, 1920 – June 21, 2019) was an American military officer and pilot who served with the Tuskegee Airmen during World War II and led the USAF's Project Blue Book from 1958 to 1963. He also served during the Korean War and the Vietnam War. He had a 28-year military career.

== Early life and education ==
Friend was born in Columbia, South Carolina on February 29, 1920. From an early age, he loved airplanes and wanted to sign up to fly for the army, but he was turned away because he was black. He attended Lincoln University in Pennsylvania and studied aviation.

== Military career ==
During World War II, Friend had 142 combat missions. After the war began the Army established a segregated program for black pilots in Tuskegee, Alabama. Friend immediately signed up and completed training. The United States Army Air Corps commissioned him as an officer in the 332nd Fighter Group. He was sent to Africa and later Europe.

After World War II, Friend stayed in the service and eventually served in the Korean and Vietnam Wars. He was in the military for a total of 28 years. He was a graduate of the Air Force Institute of Technology.

=== Air Force study on UFOs ===
Friend said he believed in the possibility of extraterrestrial life in the universe. Friend led Project Blue Book, a classified U.S. Air Force study on UFOs. The project was started in 1952 and shut down in 1969 even though 701 documented incidents remain a mystery.

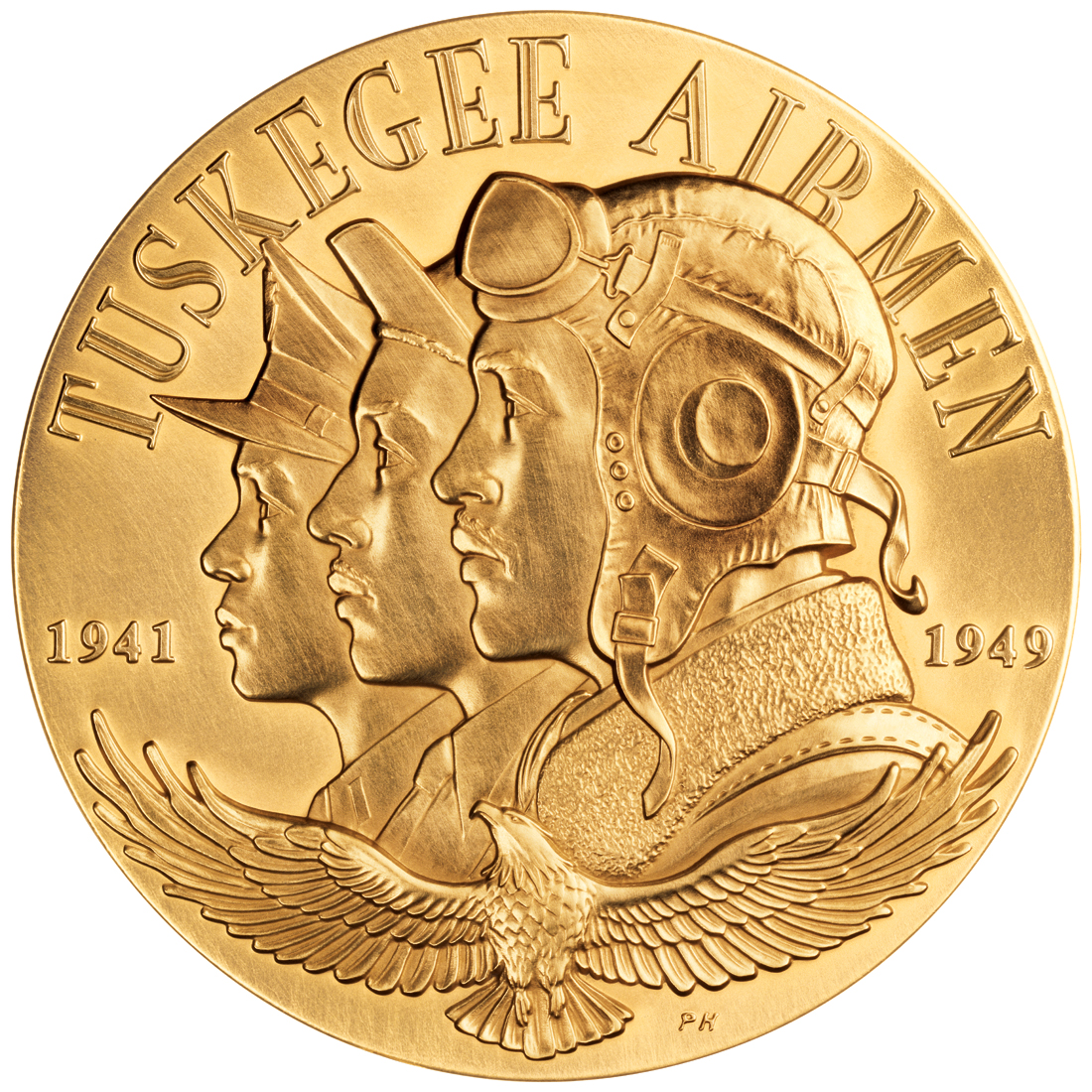
Tuskegee Airmen Congressional Gold Medal front

== Awards ==
- 2 Distinguished Flying Crosses (United States)
- Bronze Star Medal ribbon
- U.S. Army Presidential Unit Citation ribbon
- 3 U.S. Army Distinguished Service Medal ribbons
- The Air Medal
- Congressional Gold Medal awarded to the Tuskegee Airmen in 2006

== Death ==
Lt. Col. Friend died on June 21, 2019, in Long Beach, California at the age of 99 due to sepsis, according to his daughter. At the time, he was one of 12 remaining Tuskegee Airmen. He had flown 142 combat missions in World War II as part of the elite group of fighter pilots trained at Alabama's Tuskegee Institute. A public viewing and memorial was held at the Palm Springs Air Museum on July 6. He had spoken about his experiences in many different events prior to his death, such as in John Murdy Elementary School's "The Gratitude Project" in Garden Grove.

== See also ==
- Executive Order 9981
- List of Tuskegee Airmen
- List of Tuskegee Airmen Cadet Pilot Graduation Classes
- Military history of African Americans
