= Project Grudge =

USAF investigation of UFOs (1949–1951)

Reports from Project Grudge and Project Blue Book

Project Grudge was a short-lived project by the U.S. Air Force (USAF) to investigate unidentified flying objects (UFOs). Grudge succeeded Project Sign in February 1949, and formally ended in December 1949. It was followed by Project Blue Book in 1952.

== History ==
Project Grudge was intended to alleviate public anxiety over UFOs and persuade the public that UFOs constituted nothing unusual or extraordinary. UFO sightings were explained as conventional aircraft, balloons, stars, planets, meteors, optical illusions, solar reflections, or even "large hailstones". Project officials recommended that the project be reduced in scope because the very existence of Air Force official interest encouraged people to believe in UFOs and contributed to a "war hysteria" atmosphere. On 27 December 1949, the Air Force announced the termination of the project.

== Conclusions ==
Project Grudge issued its only formal report in August 1949. The report's conclusions included:

A. There is no evidence that objects reported upon are the result of an advanced scientific foreign development; and, therefore they constitute no direct threat to the national security. In view of this, it is recommended that the investigation and study of reports of unidentified flying objects be reduced in scope.
B. All evidence and analyses indicate that reports of unidentified flying objects are the result of:

1. Misinterpretation of various conventional objects.
2. A mild form of mass-hysteria and war nerves.
3. Individuals who fabricate such reports to perpetrate a hoax or to seek publicity.
4. Psychopathological persons.

The "Recommendations" section suggested that Air Force personnel receive basic instruction in astronomical phenomena.

== Response ==
An article by Sidney Shalett appeared in two consecutive issues of the Saturday Evening Post (30 April and 7 May 1949) and supported Project Grudge's assessment that UFO reports could be explained by mundane phenomena. Shalett wrote: "There are any number of logical and perfectly normal solutions by which most of the saucer sightings can be explained." Shalett went on to suggest that various weather and research balloons could explain many of the phenomena described in serious reports, while also acknowledging that "hoaxers and publicity seekers" could be responsible for some of the later reports during the then-recent craze.

Astronomer and ufologist J. Allen Hynek criticized Project Grudge, claiming that the project was "less science and more of a public relations campaign". Project Grudge also received criticism from former intelligence officer Edward J. Ruppelt, who was "convinced of the alien nature of UFOs and how he has seen the military and the U.S. government trying to discredit the extraterrestrial hypothesis". Both Hynek and Ruppelt claimed that Project Grudge was "as far from an objective, scientific examination of the phenomenon as one could get".

== See also ==
- Project Sign
- Project Blue Book
- Project Magnet

Preceded by Project Sign	US military projects investigating the UFO phenomenon	Succeeded by Project Blue Book
