= Project Blue Book =

U.S. Air Force study of UFOs (1952–1969)

Project Blue Book, complete status reports (1 to 12 and 14), including Project Grudge data, and up to May 1955

Captain Edward J. Ruppelt (left), head of Project Blue Book, at the Wright-Patterson Air Force Base project office in March 1953

Hector Quintanilla became chief of Project Blue Book in August 1963

Project Blue Book was the code name for the systematic study of unidentified flying objects (UFOs) by the United States Air Force from March 1952 to its termination on December 17, 1969. The project, headquartered at Wright-Patterson Air Force Base, Ohio, was initially directed by Captain Edward J. Ruppelt and followed projects of a similar nature such as Project Sign established in 1947, and Project Grudge in 1949. Project Blue Book had two goals, namely, to determine if UFOs were a threat to national security, and to scientifically analyze UFO-related data.

Thousands of UFO reports were collected, analyzed, and filed. As a result of the Condon Report, which concluded that the study of UFOs was unlikely to yield major scientific discoveries, and a review of the report by the National Academy of Sciences, Project Blue Book was terminated in 1969. The Air Force supplies the following summary of its investigations:

1. No UFO reported, investigated, and evaluated by the Air Force was ever an indication of threat to our national security;
2. There was no evidence submitted to or discovered by the Air Force that sightings categorized as "unidentified" represented technological developments or principles beyond the range of modern scientific knowledge; and
3. There was no evidence indicating that sightings categorized as "unidentified" were extraterrestrial vehicles.

By the time Project Blue Book ended, it had collected 12,618 UFO reports, and concluded that most of them were misidentifications of natural phenomena (clouds, stars, etc.) or conventional aircraft. According to the National Reconnaissance Office a number of the reports could be explained by flights of the formerly secret reconnaissance planes U-2 and A-12. 701 reports were classified as unexplained, even after stringent analysis. The UFO reports were archived and are available under the Freedom of Information Act, but names and other personal information of all witnesses have been redacted.

== Previous projects ==
Public USAF UFO studies were first initiated under Project Sign at the end of 1947, following many widely publicized UFO reports (see Kenneth Arnold). Project Sign was initiated specifically at the request of General Nathan F. Twining, chief of the Air Force Materiel Command at Wright-Patterson Air Force Base. Wright-Patterson was also to be the home of Project Sign and all subsequent official USAF public investigations.

Project Sign was officially inconclusive regarding the cause of the sightings. However, according to U.S. Air Force Captain Edward J. Ruppelt, the first director of Project Blue Book, Sign's initial intelligence estimate — the so-called Estimate of the Situation — written in the late summer of 1948, concluded that the flying saucers were real craft, were not made by either the Soviet Union or United States, and were likely extraterrestrial in origin. (See also Extraterrestrial UFO hypothesis.) This was subsequently rejected by Gen. Hoyt Vandenberg, U.S. Air Force Chief of Staff, citing a lack of physical proof. Vandenberg subsequently dismantled Project Sign.

Project Sign was succeeded at the end of 1948 by Project Grudge, which was criticized as having a debunking mandate. Ruppelt referred to the era of Project Grudge as the "dark ages" of early USAF UFO investigation. Grudge concluded that all UFOs were natural phenomena or other misinterpretations, although it also stated that 23 percent of the reports could not be explained.

== Project Blue Book history ==
=== Captain Ruppelt era ===
According to Captain Edward J. Ruppelt, by the end of 1951, several high-ranking, very influential USAF generals were so dissatisfied with the state of Air Force UFO investigations that they dismantled Project Grudge and replaced it with Project Blue Book in March 1952. One of these men was Gen. Charles P. Cabell. Another important change came when General William Garland joined Cabell's staff; Garland thought the UFO question deserved serious scrutiny because he had witnessed a UFO.

The new name, Project Blue Book, was selected to refer to the blue booklets used for testing at some colleges and universities. The name was inspired, said Ruppelt, by the close attention that high-ranking officers were giving the new project; it felt as if the study of UFOs was as important as a college final exam. Blue Book was also upgraded in status from Project Grudge, with the creation of the Aerial Phenomenon Branch.

Ruppelt was the first head of the project. He was an experienced airman, having been decorated for his efforts with the Army Air Corps during World War II, and having afterward earned an aeronautics degree. He officially coined the term "Unidentified Flying Object", to replace the many terms ("flying saucer", "flying disk" and so on) the military had previously used; Ruppelt thought that "unidentified flying object" was a more neutral and accurate term. Ruppelt resigned from the Air Force some years later and wrote the book The Report on Unidentified Flying Objects, which described the study of UFOs by the United States Air Force from 1947 to 1955. American scientist Michael D. Swords wrote that "Ruppelt would lead the last genuine effort to analyze UFOs".

Ruppelt implemented a number of changes: He streamlined the manner in which UFOs were reported to (and by) military officials, partly in hopes of alleviating the stigma and ridicule associated with UFO witnesses. Ruppelt also ordered the development of a standard questionnaire for UFO witnesses, hoping to uncover data that could be subject to statistical analysis. He commissioned the Battelle Memorial Institute to create the questionnaire and computerize the data. Using case reports and the computerized data, Battelle then conducted a massive scientific and statistical study of all Air Force UFO cases, completed in 1954 and known as "Project Blue Book Special Report No. 14" (see summary below).

Knowing that factionalism had harmed the progress of Project Sign, Ruppelt did his best to avoid the kinds of open-ended speculation that had led to Sign's personnel being split among advocates and critics of the extraterrestrial UFO hypothesis. As Michael Hall writes, "Ruppelt not only took the job seriously but expected his staff to do so as well. If anyone under him either became too skeptical or too convinced of one particular theory, they soon found themselves off the project". In his book, Ruppelt reported that he fired three personnel very early in the project because they were either "too pro" or "too con" one hypothesis or another. Ruppelt sought the advice of many scientists and experts, and issued regular press releases (along with classified monthly reports for military intelligence).

Each U.S. Air Force Base had a Blue Book officer to collect UFO reports and forward them to Ruppelt. During most of Ruppelt's tenure, he and his team were authorized to interview any and all military personnel who witnessed UFOs and were not required to follow the chain of command. This unprecedented authority underlined the seriousness of Blue Book's investigation.

Under Ruppelt's direction, Blue Book investigated a number of well-known UFO cases, including the so-called Lubbock Lights, and a widely publicized 1952 radar/visual case over Washington, D.C. According to Jacques Vallée, Ruppelt started the trend, largely followed by later Blue Book investigations, of not giving serious consideration to numerous reports of UFO landings and/or interaction with purported UFO occupants.

Astronomer J. Allen Hynek was the scientific consultant of the project. He had been with Projects Sign and Grudge. He worked for the project up to its termination and initially created the categorization which has been extended and is known today as Close encounters. He was a pronounced skeptic when he started, but said that his feelings changed to a more wavering skepticism during the research, after encountering a minority of UFO reports he thought were unexplainable.

Ruppelt left Blue Book in February 1953 for a temporary reassignment. He returned a few months later to find his staff reduced from more than ten, to two subordinates. Frustrated, Ruppelt suggested that an Air Defense Command unit (the 4602nd Air Intelligence Service Squadron) be charged with UFO investigations.

==== Robertson Panel ====
In July 1952, after a build-up of hundreds of sightings over the previous few months, a series of radar detections coincident with visual sightings were observed near the National Airport in Washington, D.C.

After much publicity, these sightings led the Central Intelligence Agency to establish a panel of scientists headed by H. P. Robertson, a physicist of the California Institute of Technology, which included various physicists, meteorologists, and engineers, and one astronomer (Hynek). The Robertson Panel first met on January 14, 1953 in order to formulate a response to the overwhelming public interest in UFOs.

Ruppelt, Hynek, and others presented the best evidence, including movie footage, that had been collected by Blue Book. After spending 12 hours reviewing six years of data, the Robertson Panel concluded that most UFO reports had prosaic explanations and that all could be explained with further investigation, which they deemed not worth the effort.

In their final report, they stressed that low-grade, unverifiable UFO reports were overloading intelligence channels, with the risk of missing a genuine conventional threat to the U.S. Therefore, they recommended the Air Force de-emphasize the subject of UFOs and embark on a debunking campaign to lessen public interest. They suggested debunkery through the mass media, including Walt Disney Productions, and using psychologists, astronomers, and celebrities to ridicule the phenomenon and put forward prosaic explanations. Furthermore, civilian UFO groups "should be watched because of their potentially great influence on mass thinking ... The apparent irresponsibility and the possible use of such groups for subversive purposes should be kept in mind."

It is the conclusion of many researchers that the Robertson Panel was recommending controlling public opinion through a program of official propaganda and spying. They also believe these recommendations helped shape Air Force policy regarding UFO study not only immediately afterward, but also into the present day. There is evidence that the Panel's recommendations were being carried out at least two decades after its conclusions were issued (see the main article for details and citations).

In December 1953, Joint Army-Navy-Air Force Regulation number 146 made it a crime for military personnel to discuss classified UFO reports with unauthorized persons. Violators faced up to two years in prison and/or fines of up to $10,000.

==== Aftermath of Robertson Panel ====
In his book (see external links) Ruppelt described the demoralization of the Blue Book staff and the stripping of their investigative duties following the Robertson Panel jurisdiction.

As an immediate consequence of the Robertson Panel recommendations, in February 1953, the Air Force issued Regulation 200-2, ordering air base officers to publicly discuss UFO incidents only if they were judged to have been solved, and to classify all the unsolved cases to keep them out of the public eye.

The same month, investigative duties started to be taken on by the newly formed 4602nd Air Intelligence Squadron (AISS) of the Air Defense Command. The 4602nd AISS was assigned the task of investigating only the most important UFO cases with intelligence or national security implications. These cases were deliberately siphoned away from Blue Book, leaving Blue Book to deal with the more trivial reports.

General Nathan F. Twining, who started Project Sign in 1947, was now Air Force Chief of Staff. In August 1954, he was to further codify the responsibilities of the 4602nd AISS by issuing an updated Air Force Regulation 200-2. In addition, UFOs (called "UFOBs") were defined as "any airborne object which by performance, aerodynamic characteristics, or unusual features, does not conform to any presently known aircraft or missile type, or which cannot be positively identified as a familiar object." Investigation of UFOs was stated to be for the purposes of national security and to ascertain "technical aspects." AFR 200-2 again stated that Blue Book could discuss UFO cases with the media only if they were regarded as having a conventional explanation. If they were unidentified, the media were to be told only that the situation was being analyzed. Blue Book was also ordered to reduce the number of unidentified to a minimum.

All this work was done secretly. The public face of Blue Book continued to be the official Air Force investigation of UFOs, but the reality was it had essentially been reduced to doing very few serious investigations and had become almost solely a public relations outfit with a debunking mandate. To cite one example, by the end of 1956, the number of cases listed as unsolved had dipped to barely 0.4 percent, from 20 to 30% only a few years earlier.

Eventually, Ruppelt requested reassignment; at his departure in August 1953, his staff had been reduced from more than ten (precise numbers of personnel varied) to just Ruppelt and two subordinates. His temporary replacement was a non-commissioned officer. Most who succeeded him as Blue Book director exhibited either apathy or outright hostility to the subject of UFOs or were hampered by a lack of funding and official support.

UFO investigators often regard Ruppelt's brief tenure at Blue Book as the high-water mark of public Air Force investigations of UFOs, when UFO investigations were treated seriously and had support at high levels. Thereafter, Project Blue Book descended into a new "Dark Ages" from which many UFO investigators argue it never emerged. However, Ruppelt later came to embrace the Blue Book perspective that there was nothing extraordinary about UFOs; he even labeled the subject a "Space Age Myth".

=== Captain Hardin era ===
In March 1954, Captain Charles Hardin was appointed the head of Blue Book; however, the 4602nd conducted most UFO investigations, and Hardin did not object. Ruppelt wrote that Hardin "thinks that anyone who is even interested [in UFOs] is crazy. They bore him."

In 1955, the Air Force decided that the goal of Blue Book should not be to investigate UFO reports but to minimize the number of unidentified UFO reports. By late 1956, the number of unidentified sightings had dropped from the 20–25% of the Ruppelt era to less than 1%.

=== Captain Gregory era ===
Captain George T. Gregory took over as Blue Book's director in 1956. Clark writes that Gregory led Blue Book "in an even firmer anti-UFO direction than the apathetic Hardin." The 4602nd was dissolved, and the 1066th Air Intelligence Service Squadron was charged with UFO investigations.

In fact, there was actually little or no investigation of UFO reports; a revised AFR 200-2 issued during Gregory's tenure emphasized that unexplained UFO reports must be reduced to a minimum.

One way that Gregory reduced the number of unexplained UFOs was by simple reclassification. "Possible cases" became "probable", and "probable" cases were upgraded to certainties. By this logic, a possible comet became a probable comet, while a probable comet was flatly declared to have been a misidentified comet. Similarly, if a witness reported an observation of an unusual balloon - like object, Blue Book usually classified it as a balloon, with no research and qualification. These procedures became standard for most of Blue Book's later investigations; see Hynek's comments below.

=== Major Friend era ===
Lt. Col. Robert J. Friend was appointed the head of Blue Book in 1958. Friend made some attempts to reverse the direction Blue Book had taken since 1954. Clark writes that "Friend's efforts to upgrade the files and catalog sightings according to various observed statistics were frustrated by a lack of funding and assistance."

Heartened by Friend's efforts, Hynek organized the first of several meetings between Blue Book staffers and ATIC personnel in 1959. Hynek suggested that some older UFO reports should be reevaluated, with the ostensible aim of moving them from the "unknown" to the "identified" category. Hynek's plans came to naught.

During Friend's tenure, ATIC contemplated passing the oversight of Blue Book to another Air Force agency, but neither the Air Research and Development Center nor the Office of Information for the Secretary of the Air Force was interested.

In 1960, there were U.S. Congressional hearings regarding UFOs. Civilian UFO research group National Investigations Committee On Aerial Phenomena (NICAP) had publicly charged Blue Book with covering up UFO evidence and had also acquired a few allies in the U.S. Congress. Blue Book was investigated by the Congress and the CIA, with critics — most notably, the civilian UFO group NICAP asserting that Blue Book was lacking as a scientific study. In response, ATIC added personnel (increasing the total personnel to three military personnel, plus civilian secretaries) and increased Blue Book's budget. This seemed to mollify some of Blue Book's critics, but it was only temporary. A few years later (see below), the criticism would be even louder.

By the time he was transferred from Blue Book in 1963, Friend thought that Blue Book was effectively useless and ought to be dissolved, even if it caused an outcry amongst the public.

=== Major Quintanilla era ===
Major Hector Quintanilla took over as Blue Book's leader in August 1963. He largely continued the debunking efforts, and it was under his direction that Blue Book received some of its sharpest criticism. UFO researcher Jerome Clark goes so far as to write that, by this time, Blue Book had "lost all credibility."

Physicist and UFO researcher James E. McDonald once flatly declared that Quintanilla was "not competent" from either a scientific or an investigative perspective, although he also stressed that Quintanilla "shouldn't be held accountable for it," as he was chosen for his position by a superior officer, and was following orders in directing Blue Book.

Blue Book's explanations of UFO reports were not universally accepted, however, and critics — including some scientists — suggested that Project Blue Book performed questionable research or, worse, was perpetrating cover-up. This criticism grew especially strong and widespread in the 1960s.

Take, for example, the many mostly nighttime UFO reports from the midwestern and southeastern United States in the summer of 1965: Witnesses in Texas reported "multicolored lights" and large aerial objects shaped like eggs or diamonds. The Oklahoma Highway Patrol reported that Tinker Air Force Base (near Oklahoma City) had tracked up to four UFOs simultaneously, and that several of them had descended very rapidly: from about 22000 feet to about 4000 feet in just a few seconds, an action well beyond the capabilities of conventional aircraft of the era. John Shockley, a meteorologist from Wichita, Kansas, reported that, using the state Weather Bureau radar, he tracked a number of odd aerial objects flying at altitudes between about 6000 and 9000 feet. These and other reports received wide publicity.

Project Blue Book officially determined the witnesses had mistaken Jupiter or bright stars (such as Rigel or Betelgeuse) for something else.

Blue Book's explanation was widely criticized as inaccurate. Robert Riser, director of the Oklahoma Science and Art Foundation Planetarium offered a strongly worded rebuke of Project Blue Book that was widely circulated: "That is as far from the truth as you can get. These stars and planets are on the opposite side of the earth from Oklahoma City at this time of year. The Air Force must have had its star finder upside-down during August".

A newspaper editorial from the Richmond News Leader opined that "Attempts to dismiss the reported sightings under the rationale as exhibited by Project Bluebook [sic] won't solve the mystery ... and serve only to heighten the suspicion that there's something out there that the air force doesn't want us to know about", while a Wichita-based UPI reporter noted that "Ordinary radar does not pick up planets and stars".

Another case that Blue Book's critics seized upon was the so-called Portage County UFO Chase, which began at about 5 a.m., near Ravenna, Ohio on April 17, 1966. Police officers Dale Spaur and Wilbur Neff spotted what they described as a disc-shaped, silvery object with a bright light emanating from its underside, at about 1000 feet in altitude. They began following the object (which they reported sometimes descended as low as 50 feet), and police from several other jurisdictions were involved in the pursuit. The chase ended about 30 minutes later near Freedom, Pennsylvania, some 85 miles away.

The UFO chase made national news, and the police submitted detailed reports to Blue Book. Five days later, following brief interviews with only one of the police officers (but none of the other ground witnesses), Blue Book's director, Major Hector Quintanilla, announced their conclusions: The police (one of them an Air Force gunner during the Korean War) had first chased a communications satellite, then the planet Venus.

This conclusion was widely derided, and police officers strenuously rejected it. In his dissenting conclusion, Hynek described Blue Book's conclusions as absurd: in their reports, several of the police had unknowingly described the Moon, Venus and the UFO, though they unknowingly described Venus as a bright "star" very near the Moon. Ohio Congressman William Stanton said that "The Air Force has suffered a great loss of prestige in this community ... Once people entrusted with the public welfare no longer think the people can handle the truth, then the people, in return, will no longer trust the government".

In September 1968, Hynek received a letter from Colonel Raymond Sleeper of the Foreign Technology Division. Sleeper noted that Hynek had publicly accused Blue Book of shoddy science, and further asked Hynek to offer advice on how Blue Book could improve its scientific methods. Hynek was to later declare that Sleeper's letter was "the first time in my 20 year association with the air force as scientific consultant that I had been officially asked for criticism and advice [regarding] ... the UFO problem".

Hynek wrote a detailed response, dated October 7, 1968, suggesting several areas where Blue Book could improve. In part, he wrote:

1. ... neither of the two missions of Blue Book [determining if UFOs are a threat to national security and using scientific data gathered by Blue Book] are being adequately executed.
2. The staff of Blue Book, both in numbers and in scientific training, is grossly inadequate ...
3. Blue Book suffers ... in that it is a closed system ... there is virtually no scientific dialogue between Blue Book and the outside scientific world ...
4. The statistical methods employed by Blue Book are nothing less than a travesty.
5. There has been a lack of attention to significant UFO cases ... and too much time spent on routine cases ... and on peripheral public relations tasks. Concentration could be on two or three potentially scientific significant cases per month [instead of being] spread thin over 40 to 70 cases per month.
6. The information input to Blue Book is grossly inadequate. An impossible load is placed on Blue Book by the almost consistent failure of UFO officers at local air bases to transmit adequate information ...
7. The basic attitude and approach within Blue Book is illogical and unscientific ...
8. Inadequate use had been made of the Project scientific consultant [Hynek]. Only cases that the project monitor deems worthwhile are brought to his attention. His scope of operation ... has been consistently thwarted ... He often learns of interesting cases only a month or two after the receipt of the report at Blue Book.

Despite Sleeper's request for criticism, none of Hynek's commentary resulted in any substantial changes in Blue Book.

Quintanilla's own perspective on the project is documented in his manuscript, "UFOs, An Air Force Dilemma." Lt. Col Quintanilla wrote the manuscript in 1975, but it was not published until after his death in 1998. Quintanilla stated in the text that he personally believed it arrogant to think human beings were the only intelligent life in the universe. Yet, while he found it highly likely that intelligent life existed beyond Earth, he had no hard evidence of any extraterrestrial visitation.

=== Congressional hearing ===
In 1966, a string of UFO sightings in Massachusetts and New Hampshire provoked a Congressional Hearing by the House Committee on Armed Services. According to attachments to the hearing, the Air Force had at first stated that the sightings were the result of a training exercise happening in the area. But NICAP, the National Investigations Committee on Aerial Phenomena, reported that there was no record of a plane flying at the time the sightings occurred. Another report alleged that the UFO was actually a flying billboard advertising gasoline. Raymond Fowler (of NICAP) added his own interviews with the locals, who saw Air Force officers confiscating newspapers with the story of UFOs and telling them not to report what they had seen. Two police officers who had witnessed the UFOs, Eugene Bertrand and David Hunt, wrote a letter to Major Quintanilla stating that they felt their reputations were destroyed by the Air Force. "It was impossible to mistake what we saw for any kind of military operation, regardless of altitude," the irritated officers wrote, adding that there was no way it could have been a balloon or helicopter. According to Secretary Harold Brown of the Air Force, Blue Book consisted of three steps: investigation, analysis, and the distribution of information gathered to interested parties. After Brown gave permission, the press were invited into the hearing. By the time of the hearing, Blue Book had identified and explained 95% of the reported UFO sightings. None of these were extraterrestrial or a threat to national security. Brown himself proclaimed, "I know of no one of scientific standing or executive standing with a detailed knowledge of this, in our organization who believes that they came from extraterrestrial sources." J. Allen Hynek, a science consultant to Blue Book, suggested in an unedited statement that a "civilian panel of physical and social scientists" be formed "for the express purpose of determining whether a major problem really exists" in regards to UFOs. Hynek remarked that he has "not seen any evidence to confirm" extraterrestrials, "nor do I know any competent scientist who has, or who believes that any kind of extraterrestrial intelligence is involved."

=== Condon Committee ===
Criticism of Blue Book continued to grow through the mid-1960s. NICAP's membership ballooned to about 15,000, and the group charged the U.S. Government with a cover-up of UFO evidence.

Following U.S. Congressional hearings, the Condon Committee was established in 1966, ostensibly as a neutral scientific research body. However, the Committee became mired in controversy, with some members charging director Edward U. Condon with bias, and critics would question the validity and the scientific rigor of the Condon Report.

In the end, the Condon Committee suggested that there was nothing extraordinary about UFOs, and while it left a minority of cases unexplained, the report also argued that further research would not be likely to yield significant results.

=== End ===
In response to the Condon Committee's conclusions, Secretary of the Air Force Robert C. Seamans, Jr. announced that Blue Book would soon be closed because further funding "cannot be justified either on the grounds of national security or in the interest of science." The last publicly acknowledged day of Blue Book operations was December 17, 1969. However, researcher Brad Sparks, citing research from the May 1970 issue of NICAP's UFO Investigator, reports that the last day of Blue Book activity was actually January 30, 1970. According to Sparks, Air Force officials wanted to keep the Air Force's reaction to the UFO problem from overlapping into a fourth decade, and thus altered the date of Blue Book's closure in official files.

Blue Book's files were sent to the Air Force Archives at Maxwell Air Force Base in Alabama. Major David Shea was to later claim that Maxwell was chosen because it was "accessible yet not too inviting."

Ultimately, Project Blue Book stated that UFOs sightings were generated as a result of:

- A mild form of mass hysteria.
- Individuals who fabricate such reports to perpetrate a hoax or seek publicity.
- Psychopathological persons.
- Misidentification of various conventional objects.

In April 2003, the USAF publicly indicated that there were no immediate plans to re-establish any official government UFO study programs. However, in December 2017 it was disclosed that a new secret UFO study titled the Advanced Aerospace Threat Identification Program (AATIP) had been funded at 22 million dollars from 2007 to 2012.

== USAF official statement on UFOs ==
Below is the United States Air Force's official statement regarding UFOs, as noted in USAF Fact Sheet 95-03:

From 1947 to 1969, the Air Force investigated Unidentified Flying Objects under Project Blue Book. The project, headquartered at Wright-Patterson Air Force Base, Ohio, was terminated on December 17, 1969. Of a total of 12,618 sightings reported to Project Blue Book, 701 remained "unidentified."

The decision to discontinue UFO investigations was based on an evaluation of a report prepared by the University of Colorado, titled "Scientific Study of Unidentified Flying Objects"; a review of the University of Colorado's report by the National Academy of Sciences; previous UFO studies and Air Force experience investigating UFO reports during 1940 to 1969.

As a result of these investigations, studies and experience gained from investigating UFO reports since 1948, the conclusions of Project Blue Book were:

1. No UFO reported, investigated, and evaluated by the Air Force has ever given any indication of threat to our national security.
2. There has been no evidence submitted to or discovered by the Air Force that sightings categorized as "unidentified" represent technological developments or principles beyond the range of present-day scientific knowledge.
3. There has been no evidence indicating the sightings categorized as "unidentified" are extraterrestrial vehicles.

With the termination of Project Blue Book, the Air Force regulation establishing and controlling the program for investigating and analyzing UFOs was rescinded. Documentation regarding the former Blue Book investigation was permanently transferred to the Modern Military Branch, National Archives and Records Service, and is available for public review and analysis.

Since the termination of Project Blue Book, nothing has occurred that would support a resumption of UFO investigations by the Air Force.

There are a number of universities and professional scientific organizations that have considered UFO phenomena during periodic meetings and seminars. A list of private organizations interested in aerial phenomena may be found in "Encyclopaedia of Associations", published by Gale Research. Interest in and timely review of UFO reports by private groups ensures that sound evidence is not overlooked by the scientific community. Persons wishing to report UFO sightings should be advised to contact local law enforcement agencies.

=== Post-Blue Book U.S.A.F. UFO activities ===
An Air Force memorandum (released via the Freedom of Information Act) dated October 20, 1969, and signed by Brigadier General Carroll H. "Rip" Bolender (the Deputy Director of Development and Acquisitions under the Air Force's Deputy Chief of Staff, Research and Development) states that even after Blue Book was dissolved, that "reports of UFOs" would still "continue to be handled through the standard Air Force procedure designed for this purpose." Furthermore, wrote Bolender, "Reports of unidentified flying objects which could affect national security ... are not part of the Blue Book system." To date, these other investigation channels, agencies or groups (and Bolender's involvement therein) are unknown. Upon drafting the memo, Bolender, who assumed his generalship in 1965, had recently completed a detached tour as Program Manager for Lunar Excursion Module Operations in the Apollo program, likely reporting to fellow detached Air Force officer Samuel C. Phillips. He would continue to serve in this position and rank until he retired from the Air Force in 1972.

Additionally, author Howard Blum reports that Freedom of Information Act requests show that the U.S. Air Force has continued to catalog and track UFO sightings, particularly a series of dozens of UFO encounters from the late 1960s to the mid-1970s that occurred at U.S. military facilities with nuclear weapons. Blum writes that some of these official documents depart drastically from the normally dry and bureaucratic wording of government paperwork, making obvious the sense of "terror" that these UFO incidents inspired in many U.S.A.F. personnel.

== Project Blue Book Special Report No. 14 ==
In late December 1951, Ruppelt met with members of the Battelle Memorial Institute, a think tank based in Columbus, Ohio. Ruppelt wanted their experts to assist them in making the Air Force UFO study more scientific. It was the Battelle Institute that devised the standardized reporting form. Starting in late March 1952, the Institute started analyzing existing sighting reports and encoding about 30 report characteristics onto IBM punched cards for computer analysis.

Project Blue Book Special Report No. 14 was their massive statistical analysis of Blue Book cases to date, some 3200 by the time the report was completed in 1954, after Ruppelt had left Blue Book. Even today, it represents the largest such study ever undertaken. Battelle employed four scientific analysts, who sought to divide cases into "knowns", "unknowns", and a third category of "insufficient information". They also broke down knowns and unknowns into four categories of quality, from excellent to poor. E.g., cases deemed excellent might typically involve experienced witnesses such as airline pilots or trained military personnel, multiple witnesses, corroborating evidence such as radar contact or photographs, etc. In order for a case to be deemed a "known", only two analysts had to independently agree on a solution. However, for a case to be called an "unknown", all four analysts had to agree. Thus the criterion for an "unknown" was quite stringent.

In addition, sightings were broken down into six different characteristics—color, number, duration of observation, brightness, shape, and speed and then these characteristics were compared between knowns and unknowns to see if there was a statistically significant difference.

The main results of the statistical analysis were:

- About 69% of the cases were judged known or identified (38% were considered conclusively identified while 31% were still "doubtfully" explained); about 9% fell into insufficient information. About 22% were deemed "unknown", down from the earlier 28% value of the Air Force studies.
- In the known category, 86% of the knowns were aircraft, balloons, or had astronomical explanations. Only 1.5% of all cases were judged to be psychological or "crackpot" cases. A "miscellaneous" category comprised 8% of all cases and included possible hoaxes.
- The higher the quality of the case, the more likely it was to be classified unknown. 35% of the excellent cases were deemed unknowns, as opposed to only 18% of the poorest cases.

(More detailed statistics can be found at Identification studies of UFOs.)

Despite this, the summary section of the Battelle Institute's final report declared it was "highly improbable that any of the reports of unidentified aerial objects ... represent observations of technological developments outside the range of present-day knowledge." A number of researchers, including Bruce Maccabee, who extensively reviewed the data, have noted that the conclusions of the analysts were usually at odds with their own statistical results, displayed in 240 charts, tables, graphs and maps. Some conjecture that the analysts may simply have had trouble accepting their own results or may have written the conclusions to satisfy the new political climate within Blue Book following the Robertson Panel.

When the Air Force finally made Special Report #14 public in October 1955, it was claimed that the report scientifically proved that UFOs did not exist. Critics of this claim note that the report actually proved that the "unknowns" were distinctly different from the "knowns" at a very high statistical significance level. The Air Force also incorrectly claimed that only 3% of the cases studied were unknowns, instead of the actual 22%. They further claimed that the residual 3% would probably disappear if more complete data were available. Critics counter that this ignored the fact that the analysts had already thrown such cases into the category of "insufficient information", whereas both "knowns" and "unknowns" were deemed to have sufficient information to make a determination. Also, the "unknowns" tended to represent the higher quality cases, q.e. reports that already had better information and witnesses.

The result of the monumental BMI study was echoed by a 1979 French GEPAN report, which stated that about a quarter of over 1,600 closely studied UFO cases defied explanation, stating, in part, "These cases ... pose a real question." When GEPAN's successor SEPRA closed in 2004, 5800 cases had been analyzed, and the percentage of inexplicable unknowns had dropped to about 14%. The head of SEPRA, Jean-Jacques Velasco, found the evidence of extraterrestrial origins so convincing in these remaining unknowns, that he wrote a book about it in 2005.

== Criticism ==
Hynek was an associate member of the Robertson Panel, which recommended that UFOs needed debunking. A few years later, however, Hynek claimed that Air Force personnel were indifferent, incompetent, and conducted shoddy research. Hynek notes that during its existence, critics dubbed Blue Book "The Society for the Explanation of the Uninvestigated." Regarding Ruppelt, Hynek wrote, "In my contacts with him I found him to be honest and seriously puzzled about the whole phenomenon," and of Friend he wrote, "Of all the officers I worked with in Blue Book, Colonel Friend earned my respect [and] conducted himself with dignity and a total lack of the bombast that characterized several of the other Blue Book heads." Hynek claimed that Quintanilla "disregard[ed] any evidence that was counter to his hypothesis." Hynek also reported bitter exchanges with Moody, describing Moody as "the master of the possible: possible balloon, possible aircraft, possible birds, which then became, by his own hand (and I argued with him violently at times) the probable."

Author and columnist Robert Sheaffer has written that Project Blue Book "amassed 12,618 reports, and none of them amounted to anything significant, or added to our knowledge of any subject, even after more than 50 years of investigation."

== Project Blue Book in fiction ==
=== Project UFO ===
Jack Webb produced and narrated Project U.F.O., a 1978–1979 television series based on Project Blue Book (though shifting the investigation to the present day rather than its original 1950s–1960s era.)

The series followed two Air Force investigators, William Jordan as Major Jake Gatlin (replaced in the second season by Edward Winter as Major Ben Ryan), and Caskey Swaim as Staff Sergeant (later Technical Sergeant) Harry Fitz, covering a wide variety of UFO incidents.

A former Project Blue Book officer served as the technical advisor for the series. Each episode ended with the following statement superimposed over the U.S. Air Force service mark: "The United States Air Force, after twenty-two years of investigations, concluded that none of the unidentified flying objects reported and evaluated posed a threat to our national security."

=== Twin Peaks ===
Project Blue Book played a major role in the second season of the 1990–1991 television series Twin Peaks. Major Garland Briggs, an Air Force officer who worked on the program, approaches protagonist Dale Cooper and reveals that Cooper's name turned up in an otherwise nonsensical radio transmission intercepted by the Air Force, which inexplicably originated from the woods surrounding the town of Twin Peaks. As the season progresses, it is revealed that the source of the transmission is the transdimensional realm of the Black Lodge, inhabited by beings which feed on the human emotions of pain and suffering; it eventually comes out that Briggs worked with Cooper's rival, corrupt FBI agent Windom Earle, on Project Blue Book, and that the two men apparently uncovered evidence of the Lodge during the course of their work.

=== Galactica 1980 ===
Every episode of the original Battlestar Galactica spin-off series Galactica 1980 ended with a short statement about the U.S. Air Force's 1969 Project Blue Book findings that UFOs are not proven to exist and "are not a threat to national security".

=== Project Blue Book (2019) ===
Project Blue Book is the inspiration for the drama series Project Blue Book, which began airing on the History Channel in January 2019.

== See also ==
- Advanced Aerospace Threat Identification Program – U.S. program to study UFOs (2007–2012)
- Robertson Panel – 1953 scientific committee for UAP reports
- UFO conspiracy theories – Claims of an alien visitation cover-up

Preceded by Project Grudge	US military projects investigating the UFO phenomenon	Succeeded by Advanced Aerospace Threat Identification Program
