= Edward J. Ruppelt =

American UFO researcher (1923–1960)

- Captain Edward J. Ruppelt (left), head of Project Blue Book, at Wright-Patterson Air Force Base in March 1953
- Born: Edward James Ruppelt; July 17, 1923; Grundy Center, Iowa, U.S.
- Died: September 15, 1960 (aged 37); Long Beach, California, U.S.
- Military career
- Branch: United States Air Force
- Service years: 1942–1954
- Rank: Captain
- Conflicts: World War II; Korean War
- Awards: Battle star (5); Theater combat ribbon (2); Air Medal (3); Distinguished Flying Cross (2)
- Other work: Research engineer for Northrop Aircraft Company

Edward James Ruppelt (July 17, 1923 – September 15, 1960) was a United States Air Force officer probably best known for his involvement in Project Blue Book, a formal governmental study of unidentified flying objects (UFOs). He is generally credited with coining the term "unidentified flying object", to replace the terms "flying saucer" and "flying disk" — which had become widely known — because the military thought them to be "misleading when applied to objects of every conceivable shape and performance. For this reason the military prefers the more general, if less colorful, name: unidentified flying objects. UFO (pronounced 'Yoo-foe') for short."

Ruppelt was the director of Project Grudge in 1949 and then Project Blue Book in March 1952; he remained with Blue Book until late 1953. UFO researcher Jerome Clark writes, "Most observers of Blue Book agree that the Ruppelt years comprised the project's golden age, when investigations were most capably directed and conducted. Ruppelt was open-minded about UFOs, and his investigators were not known, as Grudge's were, for force-fitting explanations on cases."

== Biography ==
=== Early life and career ===
Ruppelt was born and raised in Iowa. He enlisted in the Army Air Corps during World War II in 1942, and served with distinction as a decorated bombardier: he was awarded "five battle stars, two theater combat ribbons, three Air Medals, and two Distinguished Flying Crosses".

After the war, Ruppelt was released into the Army reserves. He attended Iowa State College, where in 1951 he earned a Bachelor of Science degree in aeronautical engineering.

Ruppelt was called back to active military duty during the Korean War in early January 1951. He was assigned to the Air Technical Intelligence Center as an intelligence officer headquartered at Wright-Patterson Air Force Base.

=== With Blue Book ===
External audio
- Presentation by Captain Edward J. Ruppelt (March 26, 1952), courtesy of DVIDS.

When Project Grudge was ordered dissolved, Project Blue Book was developed to replace it. Lt. Col. N. R. Rosengarten asked Ruppelt to take over as the new project's leader, partly because Ruppelt "had a reputation as a good organizer", and had helped get other wayward projects back on track. Though he was initially scheduled to stay with Blue Book for only a few months, when Project Grudge was reorganized in late 1951 and renamed Project Blue Book, Ruppelt (then a captain) was kept on as director.

Ruppelt wrote that the Air Force's initial approach to the UFO question "was tackled with organized confusion." In defending General Samford's press conference on 29 July 1952, immediately after the big UFO flap at Washington National Airport, Ruppelt wrote that "his [Samford's] people had fouled up in not fully investigating the sightings." Astronomer and Blue Book consultant J. Allen Hynek thought that Ruppelt did his best, only to see his efforts stymied. Hynek wrote "In my contacts with [Ruppelt] I found him to be honest and seriously puzzled about the whole phenomenon".

=== After Blue Book ===
Ruppelt requested reassignment from Blue Book in late 1953 shortly after the Robertson Panel issued its conclusions. Based partly on the panel's official report, Ruppelt's Blue Book staff was reduced from more than ten personnel to three, including Ruppelt. He retired from the Air Force not long afterwards, then worked in the aerospace industry. In 1956, he worked as a research engineer for Northrop Aircraft Company, according to publisher information in the online version of his 1956 book The Report on Unidentified Flying Objects. Hynek suggested that Ruppelt's "book should be required reading for anyone seriously interested in the history of this subject". In the book, Ruppelt detailed his time with Projects Grudge and Blue Book, and offered his assessments of some UFO cases.

In 1956, Donald Keyhoe asked Ruppelt to serve as an adviser to the newly created National Investigations Committee On Aerial Phenomena (NICAP). Ruppelt had recently suffered a heart attack, and declined Keyhoe's offer. Ruppelt's book indicates that he held some dim views of Keyhoe and his early writings; Ruppelt stated that while Keyhoe generally had his facts straight, his interpretation of those facts was another question entirely. He thought Keyhoe often sensationalized the material and accused Keyhoe of "mind reading" what he and other officers were thinking.

In what would turn out to be a matter of months before his death, Ruppelt came out with an expanded 20-chapter edition of his book, which was published by Doubleday & Co. In new chapters that were notably conservative in tone, and frequently attributed by reviewers to author disillusionment or disenchantment, Ruppelt declared UFOs a "space age myth". Content of this nature was of a noticeably different tone to famous quotes from the original "Report" that had, for example, referred critically to a 1949 change of attitude in the Project whereby "everything was being evaluated on the premise UFO's couldn't exist. No matter what you see or hear, don't believe it". Ruppelt had also been prompted to write in 1956, "This period of "mind changing" bothered me", and "this change in the operating policy of the UFO project was so pronounced that, I like so many other people, wondered if there was a hidden reason for the change. Was it actually an attempt to go underground — to make the project more secretive?"

== Death ==
In what one newspaper referred to as a "sudden" death, Ruppelt suffered a second heart attack at age 37 and died on September 15, 1960.
