= List of reported UFO sightings in the United States =

List of alleged UFO sightings

This is a list of alleged UFO sightings in the United States.

Date	City	State	Main article	Description
September 1865	Cadotte Pass	Montana		Sighting by trapper James Lumley of a craft and a subsequent crash, with reports of sulfur smells and descriptions of hieroglyphics.
1896–1897	Multiple	Multiple	Mystery airships	Alleged sightings of airship-like vehicles across the United States.
April 17, 1897	Aurora	Texas	Aurora, Texas, UFO incident	Local residents alleged that an airship crashed here, with the dead alien pilot being subsequently buried in the local cemetery.
February 24, 1942	Los Angeles	California	Battle of Los Angeles	The "Battle of Los Angeles", also known as "The Great Los Angeles Air Raid", is the name given by contemporary sources to an alleged enemy attack, and subsequent anti-aircraft artillery barrage which took place from late February 24 to early February 25, 1942, over Los Angeles, California. Initially, the target of the aerial barrage was thought to be an attacking force from Japan, but Secretary of the Navy Frank Knox, speaking at a press conference shortly afterward, called the incident a "false alarm". When documenting the incident in 1983, the US Office of Air Force History attributed the event to a case of "war nerves", likely triggered by a lost weather balloon, and exacerbated by stray flares and shell bursts from adjoining batteries.
August 1945	Jornada del Muerto	New Mexico	Trinity UFO Case	About a month after the first atomic bomb was detonated in the Jornada del Muerto desert of New Mexico, two local boys reported that they saw an "avocado-shaped" object fall from the sky. They alleged that it was a crashed vehicle containing three insect-like alien creatures.
June 21, 1947	Maury Island	Washington	Maury Island incident	The Maury Island incident is alleged to have occurred on June 21, 1947. This encounter was notably reported before Kenneth Arnold's sighting, the latter event famously having marked the start of the 1947 flying disc craze. It is also one of the earliest reported instances of an alleged encounter with so-called "men in black suits".
June 24, 1947	Mount Rainier	Washington	Kenneth Arnold UFO sighting	On June 24, 1947, Arnold said he saw nine unusual objects flying in a chain near Mount Rainier, Washington, while he was searching for a missing military aircraft in his CallAir A-2. He described the objects as almost blindingly bright when they reflected the Sun's rays; their flight as "erratic" ("like the tail of a Chinese kite") and flying at "tremendous speed". Arnold's story was widely carried by the Associated Press and other news outlets, and helped coin the term flying saucer.
July 1947	Roswell	New Mexico	Roswell UFO incident	The Roswell UFO incident involved the recovery of materials near Roswell, New Mexico, in early July 1947, which have since become the subject of intense speculation and research. There are widely divergent views on what actually happened. The United States military maintains that what was recovered was a top-secret research balloon that had crashed, whereas many ufologists believe the wreckage was of a crashed alien craft. The incident has evolved into a recognized and referenced pop culture phenomenon.
January 7, 1948	Maysville	Kentucky	Mantell UFO Incident	The Mantell Incident involved the crash and death of 25-year-old Kentucky Air National Guard pilot, Captain Thomas F. Mantell, on January 7, 1948, while in pursuit of a UFO. Historian David Michael Jacobs argued that the Mantell case marked a shift in both public and governmental perceptions of UFOs.
July 24, 1948	Montgomery	Alabama	Chiles-Whitted UFO Encounter	The Chiles-Whitted UFO Encounter is alleged to have occurred on July 24, 1948, when two American commercial pilots reported that their Douglas DC-3 had nearly collided with a strange torpedo-shaped object. The incident was investigated by the US Air Force's Project Sign.
October 1, 1948	Fargo	North Dakota	Gorman Dogfight	The Gorman Dogfight is alleged to have occurred on October 1, 1948, when a US Air Force pilot sighted and pursued a UFO for 27 minutes over Fargo, North Dakota.
May 11, 1950	McMinnville	Oregon	McMinnville UFO photographs	The McMinnville UFO photographs were taken on a farm near McMinnville, Oregon, on May 11, 1950, by Paul and Evelyn Trent.
May 29, 1950	Mount Vernon	Maryland		Captain Willis Sperry and other crewmembers on an airborne American Airlines DC-6 reported "a brilliant, diffused, bluish light of fluorescent type".
August 15, 1950	Great Falls	Montana	Mariana UFO incident	The Mariana UFO incident occurred during the summer of 1950 in Great Falls, Montana. The event garnered national media attention, as the concept of UFOs and alien invasion was extremely popular amongst Americans at the time.
August 25, 1951	Lubbock	Texas	Lubbock Lights	The Lubbock Lights were a V-shaped formation of lights seen over the town of Lubbock, Texas in August 1951.
May 24, 1952	Burbank	California	Orfeo Angelucci	Beginning in mid-1952, according to Orfeo Angelucci in his book The Secret of the Saucers (1955), he began to encounter flying saucers and their friendly human-appearing pilots during his drives home from an aircraft plant.
July 13, 1952	Washington, D.C.	Washington, D.C.	1952 Washington D.C. UFO incident	The 1952 Washington, D.C., UFO incident was a series of unidentified flying object reports from July 13 to 29, 1952, over Washington, D.C. A July headline from the New York Times read: "flying objects near Washington spotted by both pilots and radar: Air Force reveals reports of something, perhaps ‘saucers,’ traveling slowly but jumping up and down."
September 12, 1952	Flatwoods	West Virginia	Flatwoods monster	Six local boys and a local woman of Flatwoods, West Virginia, reported sighting a UFO landing and later having discovered an unusual being near the site on September 12, 1952.
November 23, 1953	Sault Ste. Marie	Michigan	Felix Moncla	Felix Moncla, Jr. was a United States Air Force pilot who disappeared with 2nd Lt. Robert Wilson while pursuing an unidentified flying object over Lake Superior in 1953. The US Air Force reported that Moncla had crashed and that the "unknown" object was a misidentified Canadian Air Force airplane, but the Royal Canadian Air Force (RCAF) disputed this claim, reporting that none of their craft were near the area in question.
November 2, 1957	Levelland	Texas	Levelland UFO case	The Levelland UFO case occurred on November 2–3, 1957, in the small town of Levelland, Texas. Levelland, which in 1957 had a population of about 10,000, is located west of Lubbock on the flat prairie of the Texas panhandle.
September 19, 1961	Lancaster	New Hampshire	Betty and Barney Hill abduction	Betty and Barney Hill claimed to have been abducted by extraterrestrials on September 19–20, 1961. Their story, commonly called the Hill Abduction and occasionally the Zeta Reticuli Incident, was the first widely publicized UFO abduction report.
April 24, 1964	Socorro	New Mexico	Lonnie Zamora incident	Lonnie Zamora was a New Mexico police officer who reported a UFO close encounter on Friday, April 24, 1964, near Socorro, New Mexico.
September 3, 1965	Exeter	New Hampshire	Exeter incident	The Exeter incident of Exeter, New Hampshire, occurred on September 3, 1965. A UFO the size of a barn was seen as close as 500 feet (150 m) away by a teenager and two police officers.
December 9, 1965	Kecksburg	Pennsylvania	Kecksburg UFO incident	The Kecksburg UFO incident of Kecksburg, Pennsylvania, occurred on December 9, 1965. A large, brilliant fireball was seen by thousands in at least six states and Ontario, Canada. It streaked over the Detroit, Michigan and Windsor, Ontario area, dropped reported metal debris over Michigan and northern Ohio, and caused sonic booms in western Pennsylvania. It was generally assumed and reported by the press to be a meteor.
1969	Leary	Georgia	Jimmy Carter UFO incident	Jimmy Carter claimed that he had seen a UFO in 1969. In 1973, while Governor of Georgia, he filed a report with the International UFO Bureau in Oklahoma City, Oklahoma.
October 11, 1973	Pascagoula	Mississippi	Pascagoula Abduction	The abduction of Charles Hickson and Calvin Parker, also known as the Pascagoula Abduction is, after the Hill Abduction, among the best-known cases of reports of alien abduction.
October 25, 1974	Medicine Bow; National Forest	Wyoming		An oil driller named Carl Higdon was reported to have experienced a close encounter of the third kind while hunting in Medicine Bow National Forest. The being he claimed to have interacted with was described as a "hunter or explorer" with strawlike hair who was capturing elk for food production. He further claims to have been invited aboard their craft to join them, but was ultimately told he was "not what [they] need" and brought back. As the majority of the encounter was recalled only through hypnosis, it has been particularly called into question by skeptics.
January 12, 1975	North Bergen	New Jersey	Stonehenge incident	Occurred in the North Hudson Park near the Stonehenge apartment building in North Bergen, New Jersey, as was reported in the Village Voice and other local media.
November 5, 1975	Snowflake	Arizona	Travis Walton	Travis Walton claims to have been abducted by a UFO on November 5, 1975, while working on a logging crew in the Apache–Sitgreaves National Forests in Arizona. Walton could not be found, but reappeared after five days of intensive search.
December 17, 1977	Council Bluffs	Iowa	Council Bluffs, Iowa fireball	Local residents reported seeing a reddish fireball approximately 500–600 feet (150–180 m) in the air falling straight down and disappearing behind trees, followed by a flash of bluish-white light suggesting an impact. The fire department was called to extinguish a grass fire where it recovered molten metal. Samples of the metal were analyzed and determined to be a simple high-carbon steel of a type common in manufacturing.
August 27, 1979	Stephen	Minnesota	Val Johnson incident	At 1:40 a.m. in August 1979, in Marshall County, Minnesota, Deputy Sheriff Val Johnson was on duty and driving close to the North Dakota border when his patrol car was struck by a blinding ball of light. Johnson was knocked unconscious, and his patrol car was damaged.
December 29, 1980	Dayton	Texas	Cash-Landrum incident	The Cash-Landrum Incident was a reported UFO sighting in 1980, after which witnesses claimed damage to their health. It is one of very few UFO cases to result in civil court proceedings. It might be classifiable as a close encounter of the second kind, due to its reported physical effects on the witnesses and their automobile.
November 11, 1987	Gulf Breeze	Florida	Gulf Breeze UFO incident	The Gulf Breeze UFO incident occurred on November 11, 1987, in Gulf Breeze, Florida.
March 8, 1994	Multiple	Michigan	1994 Lake Michigan UFO event	Over 100 witnesses reported five or six cylindrically shaped or circular objects with blue, red, white and green lights across West Michigan.
March 13, 1997	Phoenix	Arizona	Phoenix Lights	The Phoenix Lights, sometimes referred to as "The Lights Over Phoenix", is the popular name given to a series of optical phenomena that took place in the sky over the US states of Arizona and Nevada on March 13, 1997. Lights of varying descriptions were seen by thousands of people between 19:30 and 22:30 MST, in a space of about 300 miles, from the Nevada line, through Phoenix, to the edge of Tucson. UFO proponents claimed they were part of an aircraft unknown to man, while the USAF identified them as flares dropped by A-10 Warthog aircraft which were on training exercises. In 2007, former Arizona governor Fife Symington came forward and admitted that he had seen "a massive, delta-shaped craft silently navigate over Squaw Peak" in 1997.
January 5, 2000	Highland	Illinois	St. Clair Triangle	The "St. Clair Triangle", "UFO Over Illinois", "Southern Illinois UFO", or "Highland, Illinois UFO" sighting occurred on January 5, 2000, over the towns of Highland, Dupo, Lebanon, Summerfield, Millstadt, and O'Fallon, Illinois, beginning shortly after 4:00 am. Five on-duty Illinois police officers in separate locales, along with various other witnesses, sighted and reported a massive, silent, triangular aircraft at treetop altitudes. The craft's velocity dramatically accelerated from a near-hover to an incredible, high-speed departure. The incident was examined in an ABC Special, Seeing is Believing, by Peter Jennings.
October 14, 2003	Vandenberg Air Force Base	California	Vandenberg UFO sightings	On October 14, 2003, two separate UFO sightings were reported at Vandenberg Air Force Base in California. The first involved a large, silent, red rectangular object observed by three Boeing contractors near missile defence installations. Later that evening, several Air Force Security Forces personnel, including Jeffrey Nuccetelli and Chaz King, reported a huge, silent triangular object hovering over a launch facility before rapidly departing. Nuccetelli testified about the incidents before a U.S. House of Representatives task force in September 2025, while King recounted his experience in the documentary The Age of Disclosure (2025).
August 21, 2004	Chicago	Illinois		A triangular formation of reddish lights was seen at low to intermediate altitude by hundreds of witnesses, on three separate occasions in late 2004 and early 2005, producing multiple videos, photos, and mainstream local news coverage over two suburbs of Chicago, Illinois. The object(s) maneuvered slowly within a busy airspace near O'Hare International Airport. The incident was reported by local media.
November 7, 2006	Chicago	Illinois	Chicago O'Hare UFO sighting 2006	At approximately 4:30 p.m. on November 7, 2006, federal authorities at Chicago O'Hare International Airport received a report that a group of twelve airport employees were witnessing a metallic, saucer-shaped craft hovering over gate C-17.
January 5, 2009	Morristown	New Jersey	Morristown UFO	On January 5, 2009, five unidentified red objects were seen over Morristown, New Jersey. On April 1, 2009, Joe Rudy and Chris Russo admitted it was a hoax and came forward with video evidence proving they were the perpetrators, saying they wanted to demonstrate how easy it is to fool the so-called UFO "experts".
February 19, 2018	Desert	Arizona		According to the Federal Aviation Administration, three commercial pilots saw an unidentified object fly over them in open airspace above Arizona. Investigators reported that the pilots most likely saw a "high-altitude research balloon".
February 21, 2021	Clayton	New Mexico		A pilot reported seeing a long cylindrical object that almost looked like a "cruise missile type of thing" moving really fast right over the top of them, according to published audio. The sighting occurred at an altitude of 37,000 feet (11,278 m). American Airlines confirmed that the radio transmission came from Flight 2292. A few days later, the FAA stated: "A pilot reported seeing an object over New Mexico shortly after noon local time on Sunday, Feb. 21, 2021. FAA air traffic controllers did not see any object in the area on their radarscopes".
February 10, 2023	Deadhorse	Alaska	2023 Alaska high-altitude object	A high-altitude object entered U.S. airspace on February 9 and was shot down over the Beaufort Sea by the U.S. Air Force. The Department of Defense said it was the size of a small car and flying northeast at approximately 40,000 feet (12,192 m), posing a risk to civilian flight.
February 12, 2023	Lake Huron	Michigan	2023 Lake Huron high-altitude object	An octagonal object with strings hanging from it was detected over northern Montana, Wisconsin, and the Upper Peninsula of Michigan at 20,000 feet (6,096 m). Airspace was temporarily closed in the Lake Huron area, where the object was shot down by the US Air Force and National Guard, falling into Canadian waters.
June 2026	Unknown / Redacted	Western United States		In June 2026, two U.S. Government federal agents reported a dark, nonreflective triangular object near a redacted national-security site in the western United States. This UFO report was released publicly on October 23, 2026.

== See also ==
- List of reported UFO sightings
- Psychological perspectives on UFO belief
