= Chiles-Whitted UFO encounter =

1948 UFO incident in the skies near Montgomery, Alabama, United States

The Chiles-Whitted UFO encounter occurred at approximately 2:45 am on July 24, 1948, in the skies near Montgomery, Alabama, United States. Two commercial pilots, Clarence S. Chiles and John B. Whitted, claimed to have observed a "glowing object" pass by their plane before it appeared to pull up into a cloud and travel out of sight.

According to United States Air Force (USAF) officer and Project Blue Book supervisor Edward J. Ruppelt, the Chiles-Whitted sighting was one of three "classic" UFO incidents in 1948 that convinced the personnel of Project Sign, Blue Book's predecessor, "that UFOs were real", along with the Mantell UFO incident and the Gorman dogfight. However, later studies by Air Force and civilian researchers indicated that Chiles and Whitted had seen a meteor, possibly a bolide, and in 1959 Project Blue Book formally stated that a meteor was the cause of the incident.

== The incident ==
In the early morning hours of July 24, 1948, Clarence Chiles, chief pilot, and John Whitted, co-pilot, were flying an Eastern Air Lines Douglas DC-3 passenger plane near Montgomery, Alabama, at about 5,000 feet altitude. The night sky was clear with "the Moon, four days past full, shining through scattered clouds."

At about 2:45 am, Chiles "saw a dull red glow above and ahead of the aircraft." He told Whitted, "Look, here comes a new Army jet job." The object closed on their DC-3 in a matter of seconds, and both men later said they saw the object fly past the right side of their plane at high speed before it pulled "up with a tremendous burst of flame out of its rear and zoomed up into the clouds." They observed the object for a total of ten to fifteen seconds. Chiles and Whitted stated that the object "looked like a wingless aircraft...it seemed to have two rows of windows through which glowed a very bright light, as brilliant as a magnesium flare." Both pilots claimed the object was 100 feet (30 m) long and 25–30 feet (7.6–9.1 m) in diameter, torpedo- or cigar-shaped, "similar to a B-29 fuselage", with flames coming out of its tail. Only one of the plane's passengers, C. L. McKelvie, saw anything unusual. He reported seeing a "bright streak of light" that flashed by his window.

== Investigation and explanation ==
Shortly after landing in Atlanta, Georgia, Chiles and Whitted reported their sighting to the United States Air Force (USAF). They were interviewed by personnel from Project Sign, the first Air Force research group assigned to investigate UFO sightings. The personnel found that the two pilots did disagree on some details: Chiles claimed to see a lighted cockpit, long boom on the nose of the object, and the center section was transparent. Whitted did not see a cockpit or boom, and instead of the center section being transparent he claimed to see a series of rectangular windows. Neither pilot had heard any sound, and although some books and articles would later claim the plane had been hit by turbulence from the object, both pilots and the passenger who saw the "streak of light" stated that the plane was not affected at all by the object.

USAF Captain Edward Ruppelt wrote that "according to the old-timers at ATIC (Air Technical Intelligence Center), the [Chiles-Whitted] report shook them worse than the Mantell Incident... this was the first time two reliable sources had been really close enough to a UFO to get a good look." Project Sign's personnel developed a map of the object's trajectory which showed that it would have passed over Macon, Georgia. When an Air Force crew chief at Robins Air Force Base near Macon reported seeing "an extremely bright light pass overhead at high speed" on the same night as the Chiles-Whitted incident, it "seemed to confirm the [Chiles-Whitted] sighting", Ruppelt wrote. According to Ruppelt, as a result of the Chiles-Whitted incident and earlier sightings in 1947 and 1948, Project Sign's personnel decided to send an "Estimate of the Situation" to Air Force Chief of Staff Hoyt S. Vandenberg. The Estimate of the Situation "was a rather thick document with a black cover... stamped across the front were the words TOP SECRET." Project Sign's conclusion "was that [UFOs] were interplanetary!"

However, Gen. Vandenberg rejected the Estimate of the Situation in October 1948, citing that "the report's evidence was insufficient to support its conclusions." Additionally, J. Allen Hynek, an astronomer at Ohio State University and a scientific consultant to Project Sign, concluded that Chiles and Whitted had actually seen a very bright meteor. Hynek noted that "the flaming tail and sudden disappearance were consistent with the brief passage of a meteor." He also stated that a large number of bright meteors had been observed by amateur astronomers on the night of July 23–24. As for the rectangular windows and cockpit that Chiles and Whitted claimed to have seen on the object, Hynek wrote that, "It will have to be left to the psychologists to tell us whether the immediate trail of a bright meteor could produce the subjective impression of a ship with lighted windows." Although a Project Sign officer disagreed with Hynek's explanation, arguing that "it is obvious that this object was not a meteor" and that the object should remain labeled as unidentified, later researchers supported Hynek's conclusion.

Donald Menzel, an astronomer at Harvard University and a prominent UFO skeptic of that era, noted that July 24 "falls into a period of greatly increased meteor activity, when the Earth is moving through the Aquarid streams...the reports [from amateur astronomers] for the Southeast for [July 24] have particular interest for the Chiles-Whitted case." On the night of July 24, an observer in Alabama "counted fifteen meteors in one hour's watching." Two days after the Chiles-Whitted sighting, a "huge fireball flashed over North Carolina and Tennessee." Menzel wrote that "when Chiles and Whitted observed the UFO, its appearance and motion were identical with those of many other bright meteors but the pilots, startled by the sudden apparition [of the meteor] misinterpreted what they saw... there can be no doubt that Chiles and Whitted misinterpreted the appearance of an unusually bright meteor, its body glowing to white and blue incandescence... shooting off flaming gases (the "exhaust") and vaporizing from the friction of the atmosphere." Menzel also recounted the experience of a pilot in 1959 who described a fiery object very similar to the one experienced by Chiles and Whitted, but which the pilot eventually recognized to be a brilliant meteor.

Philip Klass, another prominent UFO skeptic, agreed with the meteor explanation, writing that the original Project Sign conclusion that the object was an interplanetary spacecraft was "grossly in error." Although James E. McDonald, a physicist at the University of Arizona and a prominent ufologist, interviewed Chiles and Whitted in the 1960s and concluded that they had not seen a meteor, in 1959 the USAF, based on the analysis of Hynek, Menzel, and others, labeled the Chiles-Whitted incident as having been caused by a fireball-type meteor.

== See also ==
- Kenneth Arnold UFO sighting
- UFO sightings in the United States
- List of reported UFO sightings
