= 165th Airlift Squadron =

165th Airlift Squadron

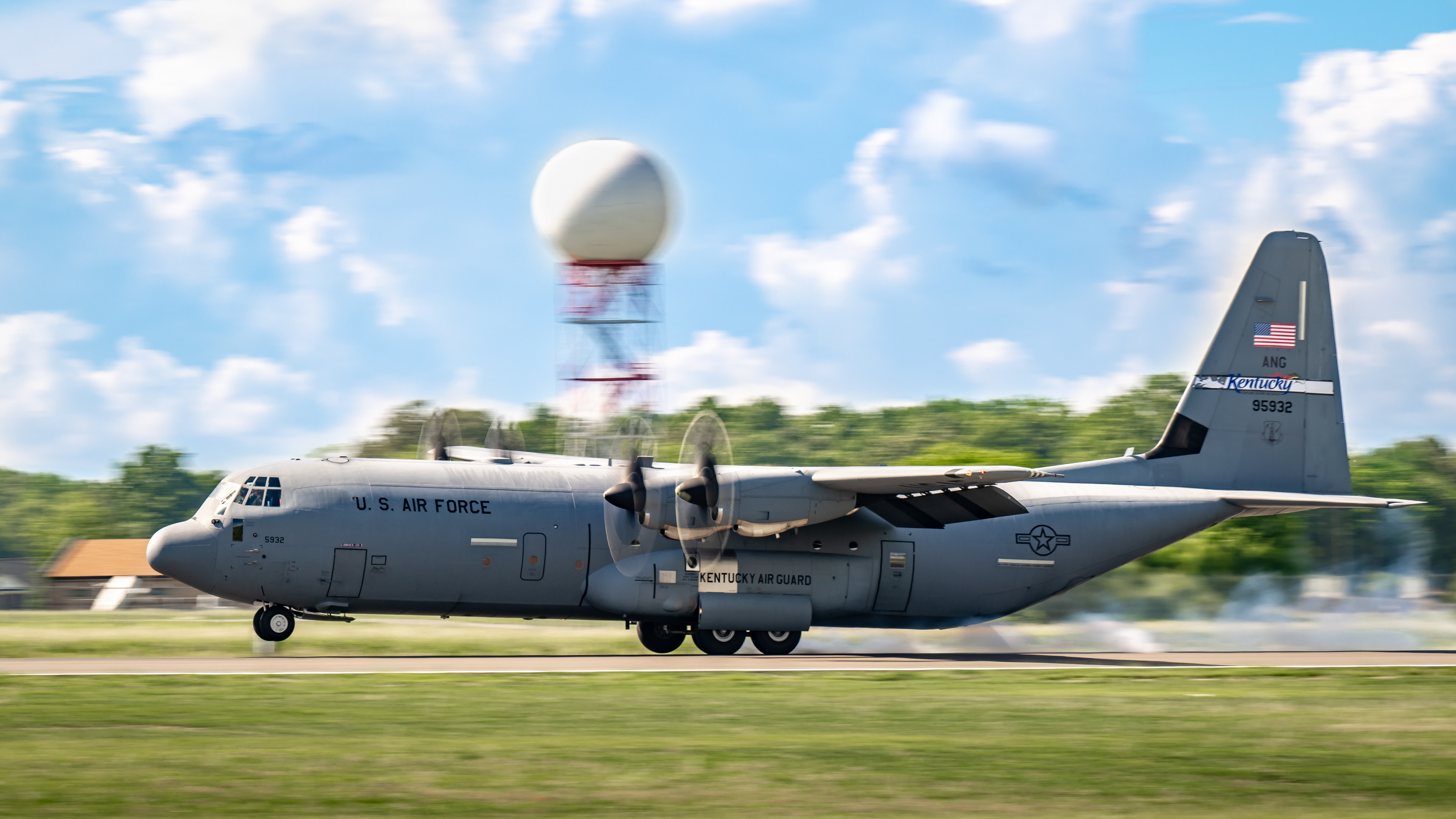
- 165th Airlift Squadron C-130J Super Hercules lands at Barkley Regional Airport in Paducah, Kentucky.
- Active: 1943-1945; 1947–1952; 1952–present
- Country: United States
- Allegiance: Kentucky
- Branch: Air National Guard
- Type: Squadron
- Role: Airlift
- Part of: Kentucky Air National Guard
- Garrison/HQ: Louisville Air National Guard Base, Kentucky
- Motto: Unbridled Spirit
- Decorations: Distinguished Unit Citation Air Force Outstanding Unit Award

Commanders
- Current commander: Lt Col Dave Flynn

Insignia
- 165th Airlift Squadron emblem

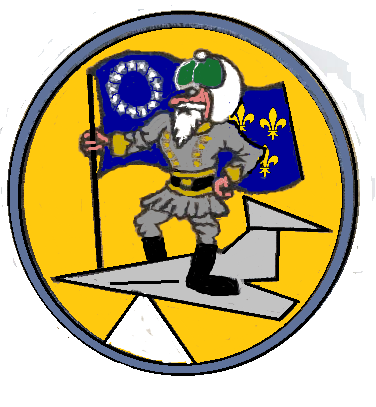
- 165th Tactical Reconnaissance Squadron emblem

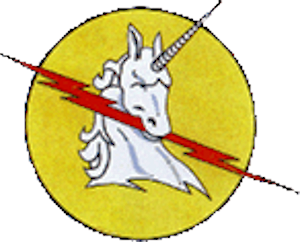
- 368th Fighter Squadron emblem

- Tail stripe

The 165th Airlift Squadron is a unit of the Kentucky Air National Guard 123d Airlift Wing located at Louisville Air National Guard Base, Kentucky. The 165th is equipped with the C-130J Super Hercules.

== History ==
=== World War II ===
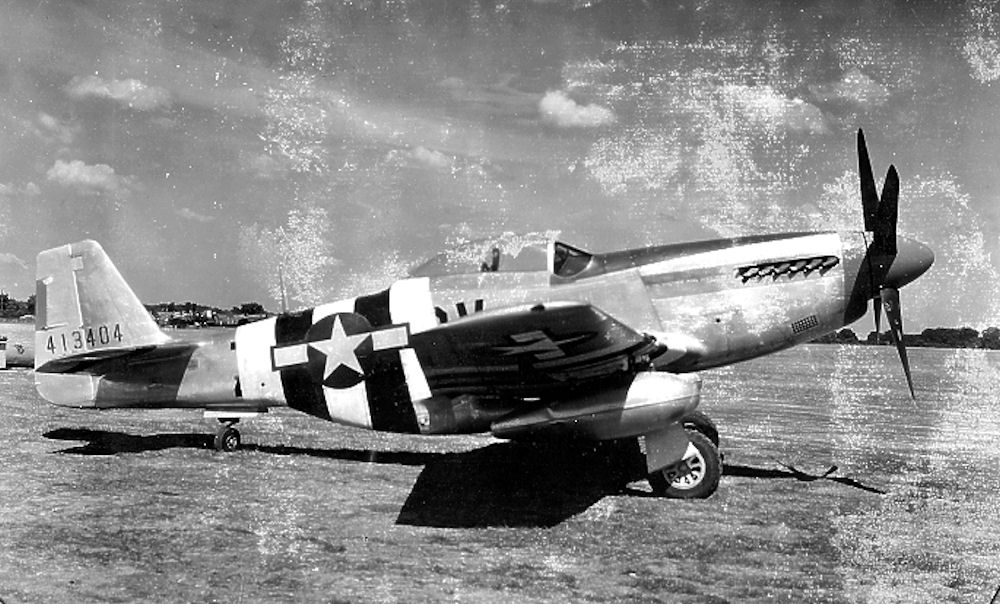
368th Fighter Squadron P-51D Mustang 44-13404 in D-Day markings, RAF East Wretham, England.

Organized and trained in New England during 1943. Moved to England in January 1944, being assigned to VIII Fighter Command. Entered combat in mid-December 1943, supported the invasion of Normandy during June 1944 by patrolling the English Channel, escorting bombardment formations to the French coast, and dive-bombing and strafing bridges, locomotives, and rail lines near the battle area. After D-Day, engaged chiefly in escorting bombers to oil refineries, marshalling yards, and other targets in such cities as Ludwigshafen, Stuttgart, Frankfurt, Berlin, Merseburg, and Bruex. Continued combat operations until the German capitulation in May 1945. Returned to the United States and was inactivated in November, 1945.

=== Kentucky Air National Guard ===
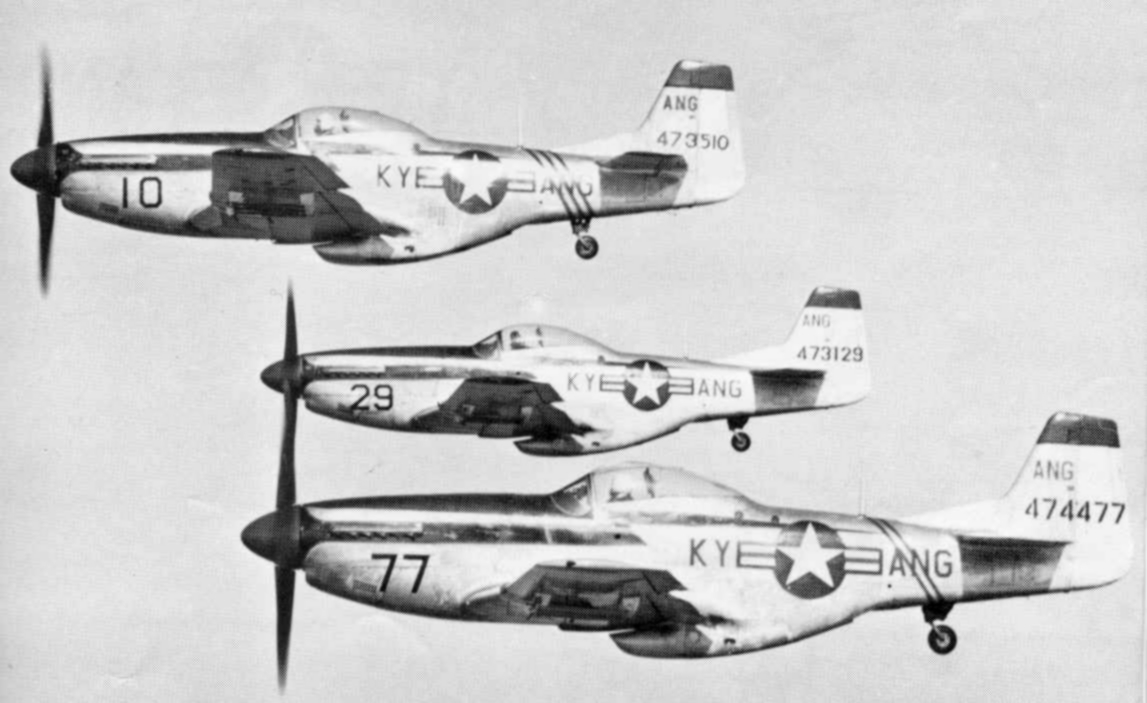
F-51Ds of the Kentucky ANG

The wartime 368th Fighter Squadron was re-designated as the 165th Fighter Squadron, and was allotted to the Kentucky Air National Guard, on 16 February 1947 . It was organized at Standiford Field, Louisville, Kentucky, and was extended federal recognition on 9 June 1947 by the National Guard Bureau. The 165th Fighter Squadron was bestowed the history, honors, and colors of the 368th Fighter Squadron. The squadron was equipped with 25 F-51D Mustangs and was assigned to the 123d Fighter Group, with an air defense mission for the state of Kentucky.

During the postwar years, the Air National Guard was almost like a flying country club and a pilot could often show up at the field, check out an aircraft and go flying. However, these units also had regular military exercises that kept up proficiency and in gunnery and bombing contests they would often score better than full-time USAF units. The unit's aircrews rapidly attained a high level of combat readiness, and just two years later, the unit earned its first Spaatz Trophy—an award given each year to the premier Air National Guard flying unit. In 1948, Captain Thomas Francis Mantell Jr., a pilot in the 165th Fighter Squadron, was killed while in pursuit of an Unidentified Flying Object in the Mantell UFO incident.

==== Korean War federalization ====
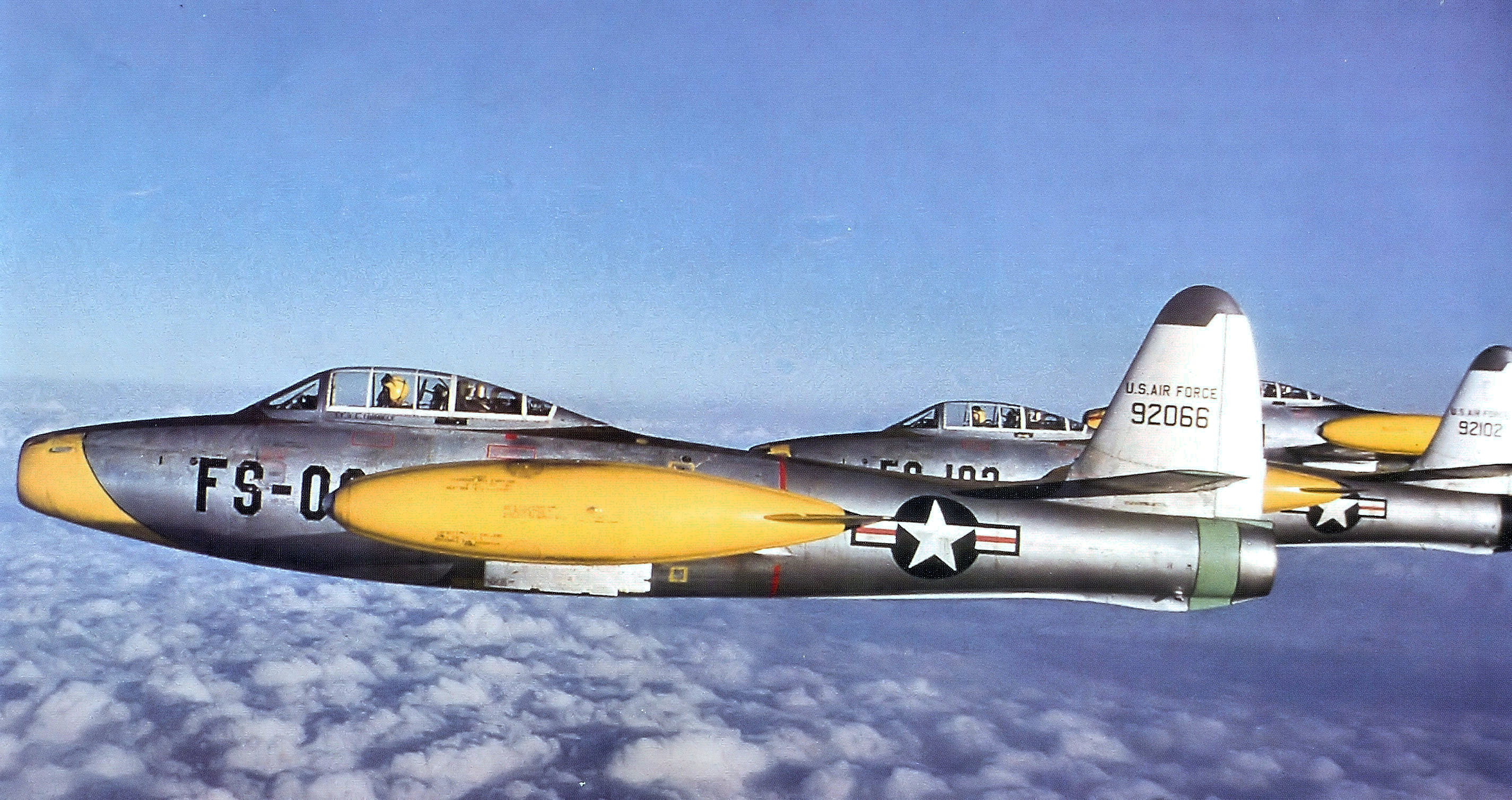
Republic F-84E Thunderjet flown by the 123d Fighter Group at RAF Manston, England

With the surprise invasion of South Korea on 25 June 1950 all three squadrons were equipped with F-51Ds.

After over a year of training at Godman Air Force Base, the squadron was redesignated as the 165th Fighter-Bomber Squadron and deployed to RAF Manston, Kent, England to replace the Strategic Air Command (SAC) 12th Fighter-Escort Wing which was returned to Bergstrom Air Force Base, Texas. In England, the mission of the 123d was to provide fighter escort for SAC B-50 Superfortress and B-36 Peacemaker bombers while flying over Western European airspace on their deterrence alert missions. The 123d left their F-51Ds at Godman and the personnel boarded C-124 Globemaster II transports to England where they initially began conversion training on F-84E Thunderjets.

The training program began with the inexperienced F-51D pilots experiencing training difficulties with the jet aircraft, with several aircraft being lost in accidents. However, by March 1952 the 134th was judged to be 80% combat ready on the Thunderjets. However, the period of federalization for the 123d was expiring and in July 1952, the unit personnel were returned to the United States, the aircraft at RAF Manston being passed on to the active-duty 406th Fighter-Bomber Wing was activated in place.

==== Tactical fighter mission ====
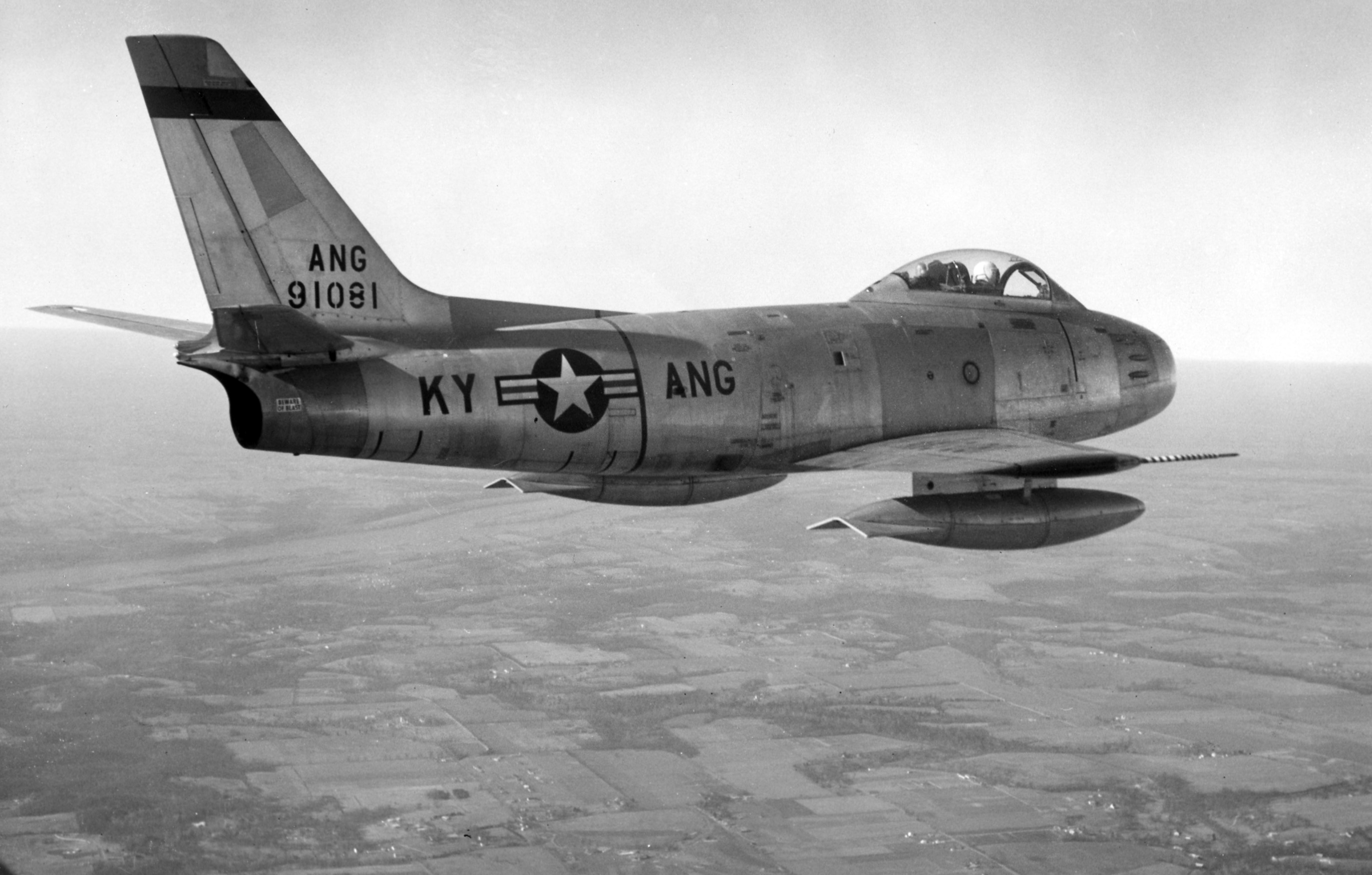
Kentucky ANG F-86A Sabre

After returning from England, the unit reformed at Louisville. Because most jet aircraft were still in USAF use, the squadron received F-51D Mustangs and initially returned to its pre-federalization air defense mission, being designated as a Fighter-Interceptor unit. However, with the F-51s, the Kentucky Air National Guard was limited to daylight training only.

On 1 January 1953, the Group was transferred to Tactical Air Command jurisdiction and re-equipped with refurbished F-86A Sabre air superiority fighter. With the switchover to TAC, the unit designation was changed to "Fighter-Bomber".

==== Tactical reconnaissance mission ====
The 165th only flew the Sabre for two years, when it was re-equipped with Martin RB-57A Canberra reconnaissance aircraft. it became the 165th Tactical Reconnaissance Squadron, in which it would remain for the next thirty years. The 165th would perform day and night, high and low, and visual and photographic reconnaissance. Unlike the Sabre fighters, the RB-57A was totally unarmed. The crew was two—one pilot and one photo-navigator. One of their major activities of the 123d in the United States was to carry out photographic surveys of areas hit by natural disasters such as hurricanes or tornadoes. In 1965, the 123d was awarded its second Spaatz Trophy for superior combat readiness and flight training.

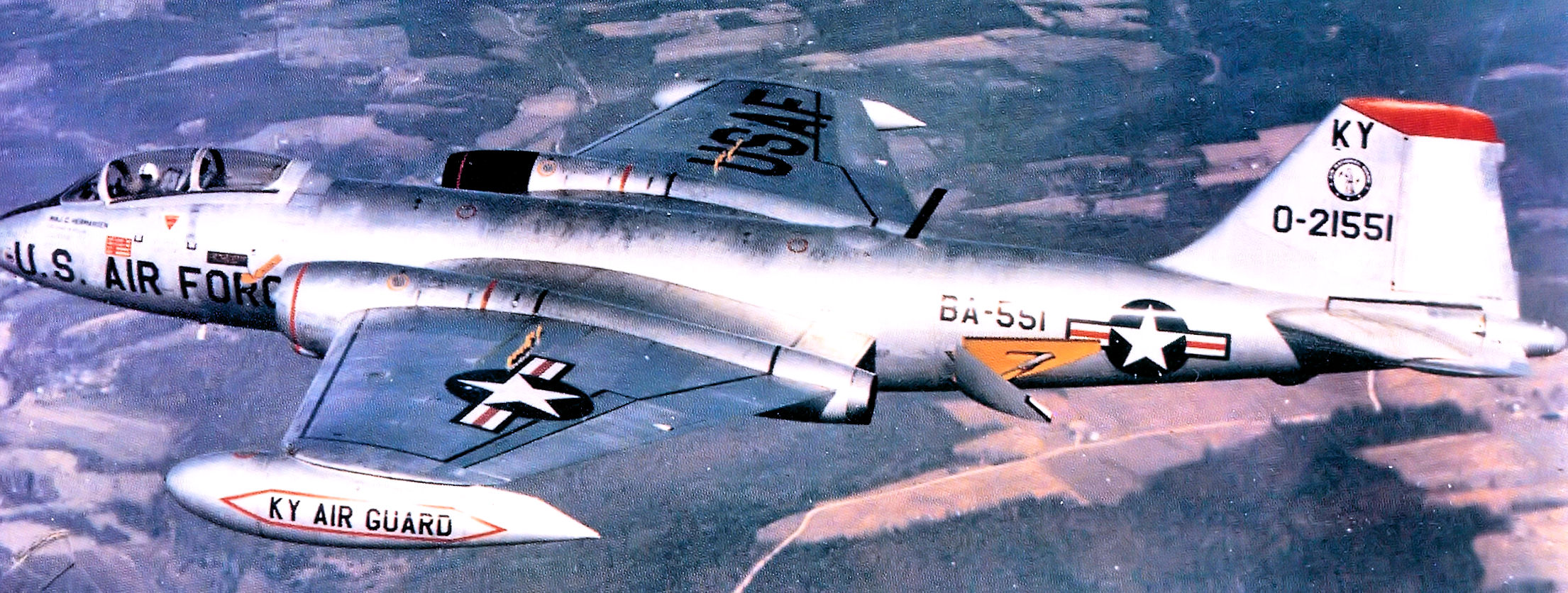
KY ANG Martin B-57B Canberra, about 1963

In 1965, the unit transferred its RB-57s to active duty to be deployed to South Vietnam. In return the 123d was re-equipped, receiving the RF-101G Voodoo. The RF-101G was a derivative aircraft from twenty-nine ex-USAF F-101A Tactical Fighters that were withdrawn from fighter duty and were modified by Lockheed Aircraft Service Company of Ontario, California to serve as unarmed tactical reconnaissance aircraft for use by the Air National Guard. These aircraft were re-designated as RF-101G. As compared to the RF-101A dedicated photo-reconnaissance version of the F-101A, the RF-101G had a shorter and broader nose. These aircraft went to the Kentucky Air National Guard in July 1965, replacing the RB-57B.

On 26 January 1968, the Pueblo Crisis precipitated the 123d's recall to federal service. Now officially known as the 123d Tactical Reconnaissance Wing, the unit flew just under 20,000 tactical flying hours with the RF-101G and delivered nearly 320,000 reconnaissance prints to requesting agencies. Assigned personnel served on active duty for 16 months.

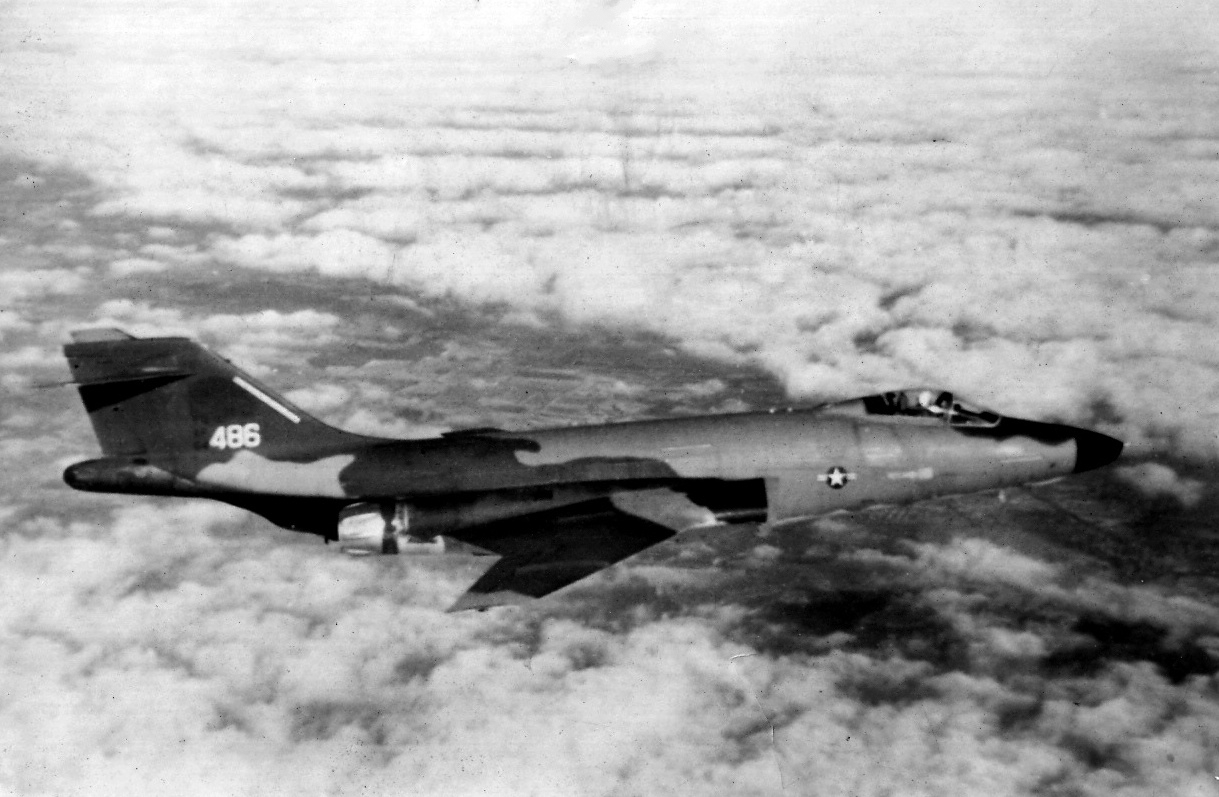
Kentucky ANG RF-101H flying a combat mission in South Vietnam, 1968

The 123d TRW experienced a rocky tour of active duty. The wing had not been rated combat-ready when mobilized on 26 January 1968 primarily due to equipment shortages. It was not part of Secretary McNamara's Selected Reserve Force. The unit was given an unsatisfactory ORI rating in October 1968. Despite those problems, the 123d made a significant contribution to active force operations. It began functioning as the primary Air Force tactical reconnaissance unit in the continental U.S. Elements of its squadrons rotated temporary duty assignments in Japan and South Korea from July 1968 until April 1969 providing photo reconnaissance support to American forces in those areas, including service in South Vietnam flying combat reconnaissance missions.

The 123d was released from active duty and returned to Kentucky state control on 8 June 1969. The wing earned its first Air Force Outstanding Unit Award for its exceptional performance during this period.

In 1971, there was a re-organization of Air National Guard tactical reconnaissance units, with all the RF-101Gs being sent to the Arkansas ANG 184th Tactical Reconnaissance Squadron. The Kentucky ANG transferred its RF-101Gs to the Arkansas ANG and transitioned to the RF-101H Voodoo, a follow-on to the RF-101G. Being derived from the F-101C tactical fighter, the RF-101H differed from the RF-101G in having a strengthened airframe designed to allow maneuvers at up to 7.33 G. and having different fuel pumps and fuel feed and control systems, increasing its maximum available afterburner time from six minutes to 15.

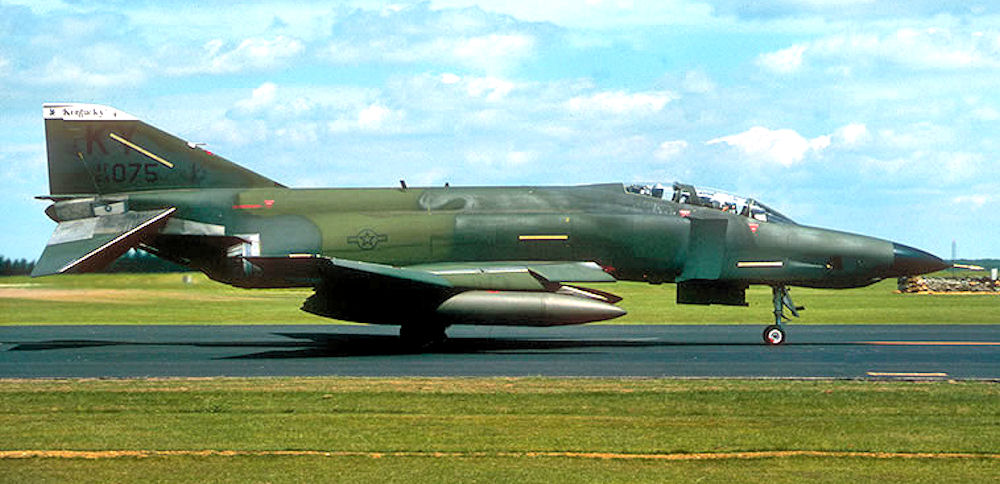
165th TRS RF-4C 64-1075 in the late 1980s

During 1976, a no-notice conversion announced by the National Guard Bureau brought the two-seat RF-4C Phantom II to the Kentucky Air National Guard, with the RF-101Hs aircraft being retired to AMARC. The unit attained combat-ready status within seven months—a record time. The Phantom years were marked with many overseas deployments, participation in international photo reconnaissance competitions and a remarkable flight safety record. In 1981, the unit placed first in the Air National Guard Photo Finish Competition and earned an unprecedented third Spaatz Trophy.

In May 1983 the unit reached another historic milestone when it earned the highest possible rating from Tactical Air Command during its Operational Readiness Inspection. This was the first time that a TAC unit had received an outstanding rating. On 1 January 1989 the unit was awarded its seventh Air Force Outstanding Unit Award—a record for any Air National Guard unit.

==== Tactical airlift ====
The collapse of the Soviet Union and the dissolution of the Warsaw Pact led to accelerated retirement plans for active duty USAF RF-4Cs. In 1988, the Kentucky Air National Guard's Phantoms were sent to AMARC, and on 9 January 1989 the 123d was officially re-designated the 123d Tactical Airlift wing and began conversion to the C-130B Hercules transport aircraft. By the end of the year, the unit had been involved in many worldwide airlift missions, including exercise Volant Oak in Panama. The unit also participated in an airlift competition, Sentry Rodeo. The wing's first humanitarian airlift came in the aftermath of Hurricane Hugo.

Although the 165th Tactical Airlift Squadron, the wing's flying component, was not federally mobilized for Operations Desert Shield and Desert Storm, unit volunteers stepped forward to support the war effort. From August 1990 to March 1991, the 165th flew 1,240 airlift sorties worldwide in direct support of the Gulf War—the most for any Air National Guard unit. An additional 88 wing members were activated in support of Desert Shield/Storm.

==== Post Cold War era ====
In May 1992 the 123d received the 2000th C-130 straight off the assembly line as it began conversion to the C-130H Hercules. Eight months later, the 123rd deployed to Mombassa, Kenya, to fly relief missions into Somalia for Operation Restore Hope and Operation Provide Relief. Citizen-soldiers from the 123d flew 150 sorties and transported 720 tons of relief supplies and 1,444 passengers into some of the hardest-hit areas in Somalia.

When the world's attention shifted to Eastern Europe in February 1993, the 123d responded again, deploying in support of Operation Provide Promise. The unit's all-volunteer force flew 1,082 airdrop and air-land sorties and delivered 2,215 tons of food and supplies into war-torn Bosnia-Herzegovina. To support the operation, the wing deployed 451 personnel into Rhein-Main Air Base, Germany, over several rotations until May 1994.

In July 1994 the 123d answered another call for help and deployed within 72 hours of notification to fly relief missions into Rwanda and Zaire for Operation Support Hope. Operating out of Mombassa, Kenya, unit personnel flew 147 sorties, transporting 652.5 tons of relief supplies to the beleaguered Rwandan refugees. Personnel from the unit's 205th Combat Communications Squadron also deployed to Haiti that year as part of Operation Uphold Democracy, providing satellite communications links for the theater commander.

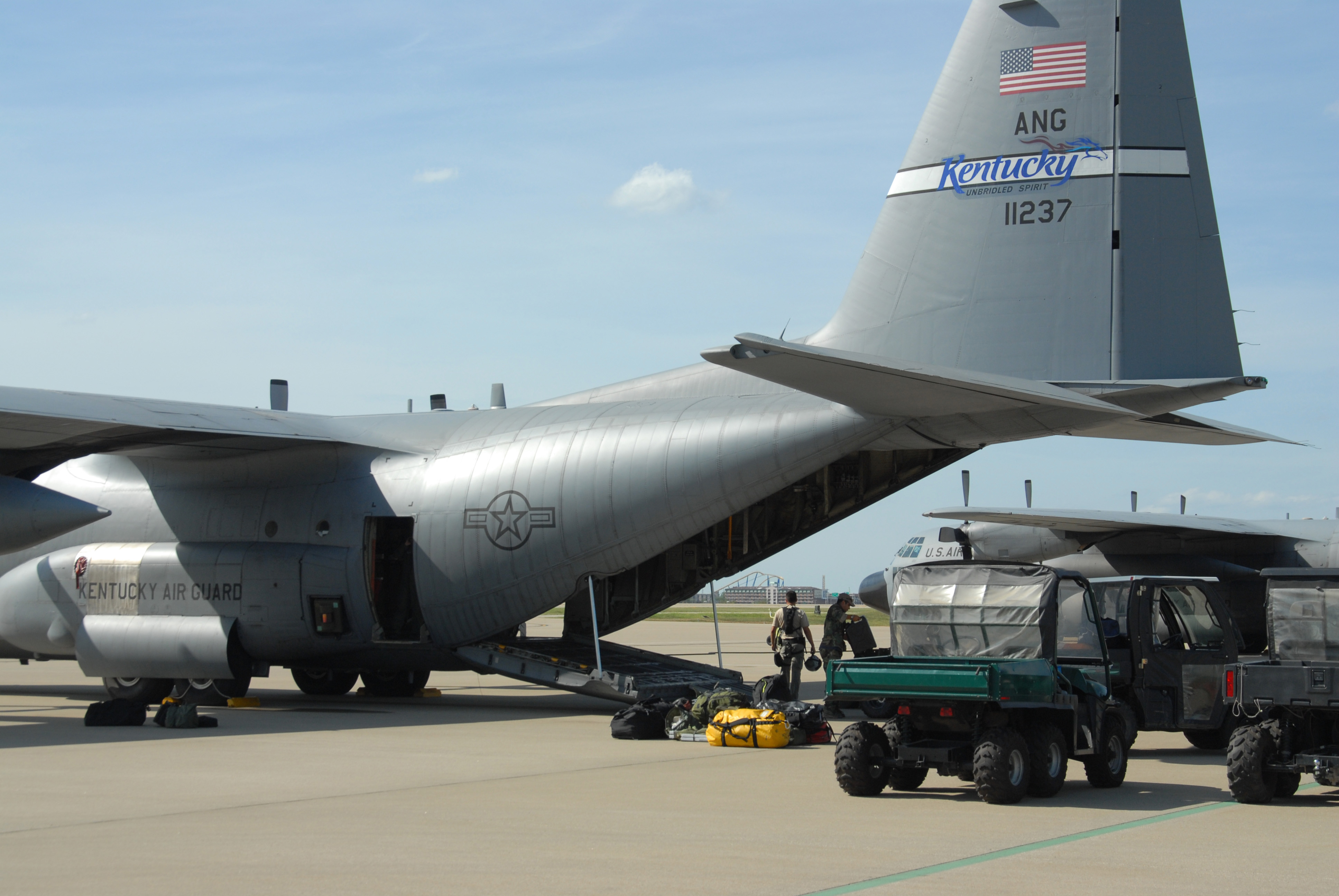
Members of the Kentucky Air Guard's 123rd Special Tactics Squadron load rescue gear onto a C-130 for deployment to coastal Texas

In September 1994 the wing's sustained record of achievement was recognized by award of the 1993 Curtis N. Rusty Metcalf Trophy, presented annually to the best Air National Guard airlift or air refueling unit. The wing also earned the Air National Guard Distinguished Flying Unit Plaque and Air Force Flight Safety Plaque. In November 1994 the unit was granted its eighth Air Force Outstanding Unit Award.

The wing returned to Bosnia in 1996 to provide airlift for U.S. and NATO troops who were protecting the fragile peace. More than 170 Kentuckians volunteered for the mission, which delivered 913 tons of cargo and transported 2,296 passengers. The wing also achieved the highest readiness rate of any unit in the theater. That commitment to service continued in 1997, when the unit participated in several overseas deployments while offering a helping hand at home. More than 100 Kentucky Air Guard troops provided security forces, medical aid, communications links and civil engineering crews after record flooding ravaged several Kentucky communities.

The unit also made its presence felt overseas, offering civil engineering skills in Spain and airlift services in Saudi Arabia as part of Operation Southern Watch, which enforced the no-fly zone in Southern Iraq. Other wing members deployed to Egypt as part of a multinational training exercise that integrated 7,000 troops from every branch of the U.S. military and six foreign countries.

In February 1998, the 123d Airlift Wing received its ninth Air Force Outstanding Unit Award. The following month, the wing accepted its sixth Distinguished Flying Unit Plaque, recognizing the 123d Airlift Wing as one of the top five Air Guard flying units in the nation for 1997. A mere three months later, the wing as presented with the 15th Air Force Reserve Forces Trophy as the top reserve unit in the numbered Air Force.

1998 continued the 123rd Airlift Wing's tradition of global deployments with missions to Panama as part of Operation Coronet Oak and Ecuador for Nuevos Horizontes '98. The latter operation, whose name means New Horizons in Spanish, was a Southern Command joint training exercise that gave Kentucky Army and Air Guard engineers the opportunity to fine-tune military skills while constructing clinics, schools, and latrines in rural areas of the South American nation. Nearly 1,300 of the Commonwealth's citizen-soldiers participated in the effort, which also provided impoverished Ecuadorians with basic dental and medical care.

The following year, the wing returned to Bosnia once more to provide theater airlift for the continuing peacekeeping mission, now called Operation Joint Forge. More than 350 Kentucky aircrew, maintainers, and support personnel deployed for the operation, along with about 200 members of the Ohio Air National Guard's 179th Airlift Wing.

The two unit's C-130s flew nearly 500 sorties during the deployment, delivering 3,500 passengers and more than 1,000 tons of cargo to sites across Europe and inside Bosnia, including Sarajevo and Tuzla. The units also were tasked with helping stockpile equipment for what became Operation Allied Force, the NATO air campaign against Serbian forces in the former Republic of Yugoslavia. Working around the clock with the 37th Airlift Squadron at Ramstein Air Base, Germany, the Kentucky and Ohio crews flew more than 70 tons of fighter support equipment from RAF bases in England and Germany to bases in Italy. The Kentucky Air Guard closed out 1999 by again deploying for Operation Southern Watch, providing theater airlift services from an air base in Muscat, Oman.

==== Air expeditionary deployments ====
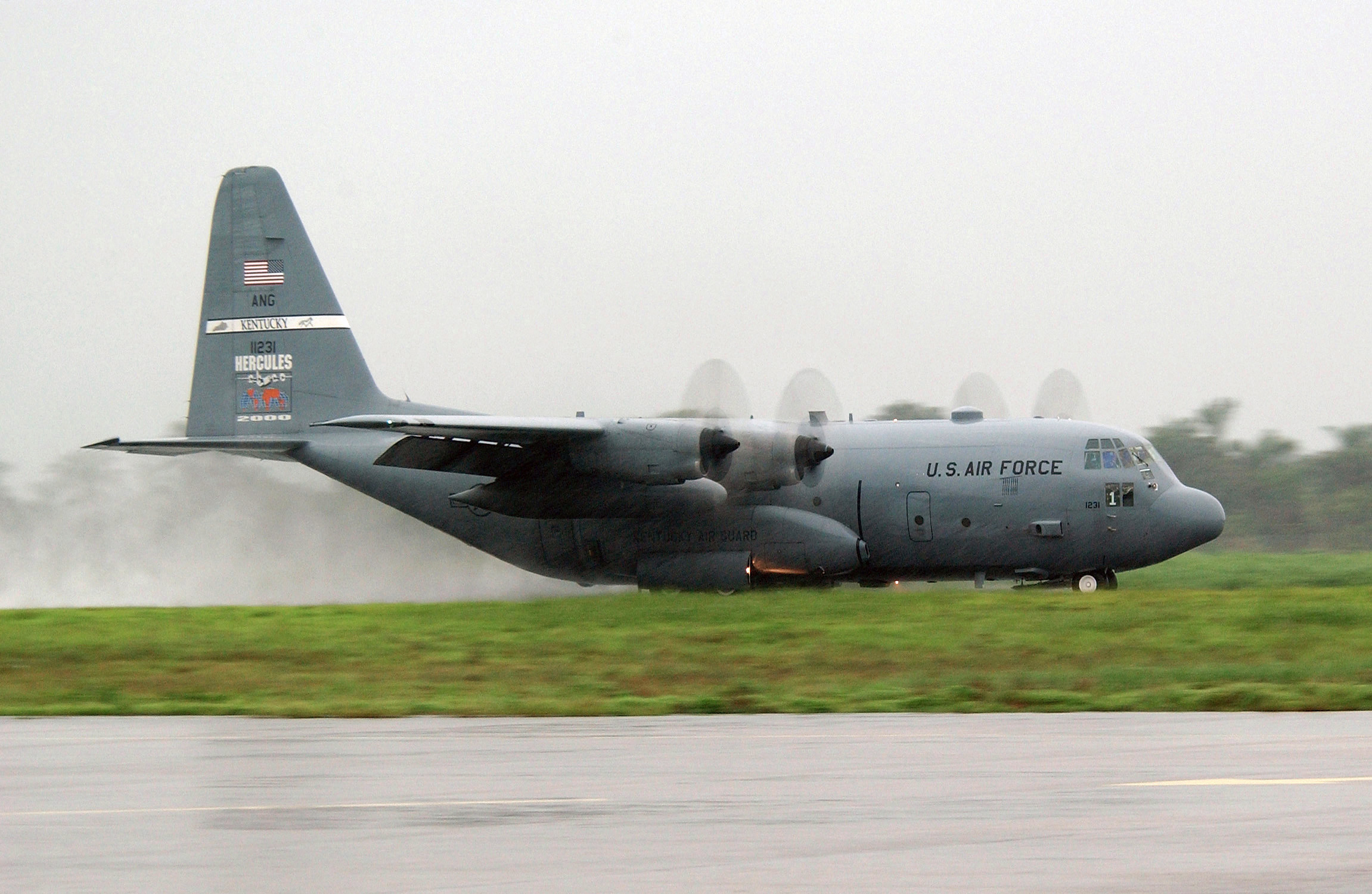
A U.S. Air Force Lockheed C-130H Hercules (s/n 91-1231) from the 165th Airlift Squadron, 123rd Airlift Wing, Kentucky Air National Guard, lands at Lungi, Sierra Leone, on 21 July 2003.

In mid-1996, the Air Force, in response to budget cuts, and changing world situations, began experimenting with Air Expeditionary organizations. The Air Expeditionary Force (AEF) concept was developed that would mix Active-Duty, Reserve and Air National Guard elements into a combined force. Instead of entire permanent units deploying as "Provisional" as in the 1991 Gulf War, Expeditionary units are composed of "aviation packages" from several wings, including active-duty Air Force, the Air Force Reserve Command and the Air National Guard, would be married together to carry out the assigned deployment rotation.

Shortly thereafter, the unit began planning for a 90-day deployment to Muscat, Oman, to again support U.S. troops enforcing the no-fly zone in Southern Iraq. More than 160 personnel were joined by members of the Ohio Air Guard's 179th Airlift Wing to support Operation Northern Watch. Together, the two units flew 345 sorties during their three-month tasking, delivering 895 tons of cargo and 1,122 passengers to destinations in Qatar, Saudi Arabia and the United Arab Emirates. The mission, which was part of the Air Force's first-ever Aerospace Expeditionary Force, concluded in December 1999.

By April 2000 the 123d Airlift Wing had received its 10th Air Force Outstanding Unit Award, and global deployments continued to mark the wing's activities.

More than 580 Kentucky Air Guard members deployed overseas from December 2000 to March 2001 as part of Air Expeditionary Forces based in Germany and Southwest Asia. Other unit members were sent to South America to participate in drug interdiction efforts. The largest contingent of Kentucky forces—nearly 470 aircrew, maintenance and support personnel—operated from Ramstein Air Base, Germany, in support of Operation Joint Forge, the multinational peacekeeping mission in Bosnia-Herzegovina. While there, unit members transported approximately 2,500 passengers and 410 tons of cargo to locations like Sarajevo and Tuzla, Bosnia; and Taszar, Hungary.

Other 123d members deployed to Kuwait, Saudi Arabia, the United Arab Emirates and Turkey in support of Operation Joint Forge, Operation Southern Watch and Operation Northern Watch. The latter two missions are responsible for enforcing no-fly zones imposed upon Iraq following the 1991 Gulf War.

==== Global War on Terrorism ====
After the September 11, 2001, terrorist attacks, unit members were tasked to participate in the war against terrorism and in homeland defense. Currently, more than 500 Kentucky ANG troops have been called to active duty for at least a year while scores of additional troops are serving on short-term duty as needed to support Operation Noble Eagle and Operation Enduring Freedom.

In the first half of 2002, the wing received three major honors recognizing its superior performance in 2001. The awards were the 15th Air Force Solano Trophy, given each year to the top reserve unit in the 15th Air Force; the Metcalf Trophy, given annually to the best tanker or airlift unit in the Air National Guard; and the Air Force Outstanding Unit Award—the wing's 11th such honor.

The wing also stood up the Air National Guard's first contingency response group—a rapid-reaction "airbase in a box" with all the personnel, training and equipment needed to deploy to a remote site, open up a runway and establish airfield operations so that aid and troops can begin to flow into affected areas after a disaster.

The group was instrumental in responding to the statewide ice storm last year that left nearly 770,000 households without power and water for days. All told, the wing deployed more than 380 Airmen across the commonwealth to clear roads, distribute food and water and conduct house-to-house "wellness checks" credited with saving two people from death by carbon monoxide poisoning.

The unit was equally engaged back home. When Hurricane Gustav began closing in on the Gulf Coast in August 2008, the 123d Airlift Wing provided the facilities and support for relief agencies to evacuate more than 1,400 New Orleans residents to Louisville and then repatriate them after the danger had passed.

In 2009, the Wing was awarded its 14th Air Force Outstanding Unit Award for accomplishments from 1 October 2007 to 30 September 2009. During those two years, the wing stepped up to perform numerous critical missions at home and abroad, deploying 759 personnel—many of them in harm's way. For example, about 300 Kentucky Airmen and multiple C-130 aircraft were deployed to Bagram Air Base, Afghanistan, from March through May 2009 to provide key airlift support for U.S. forces engaged with the enemy in Operation Enduring Freedom.

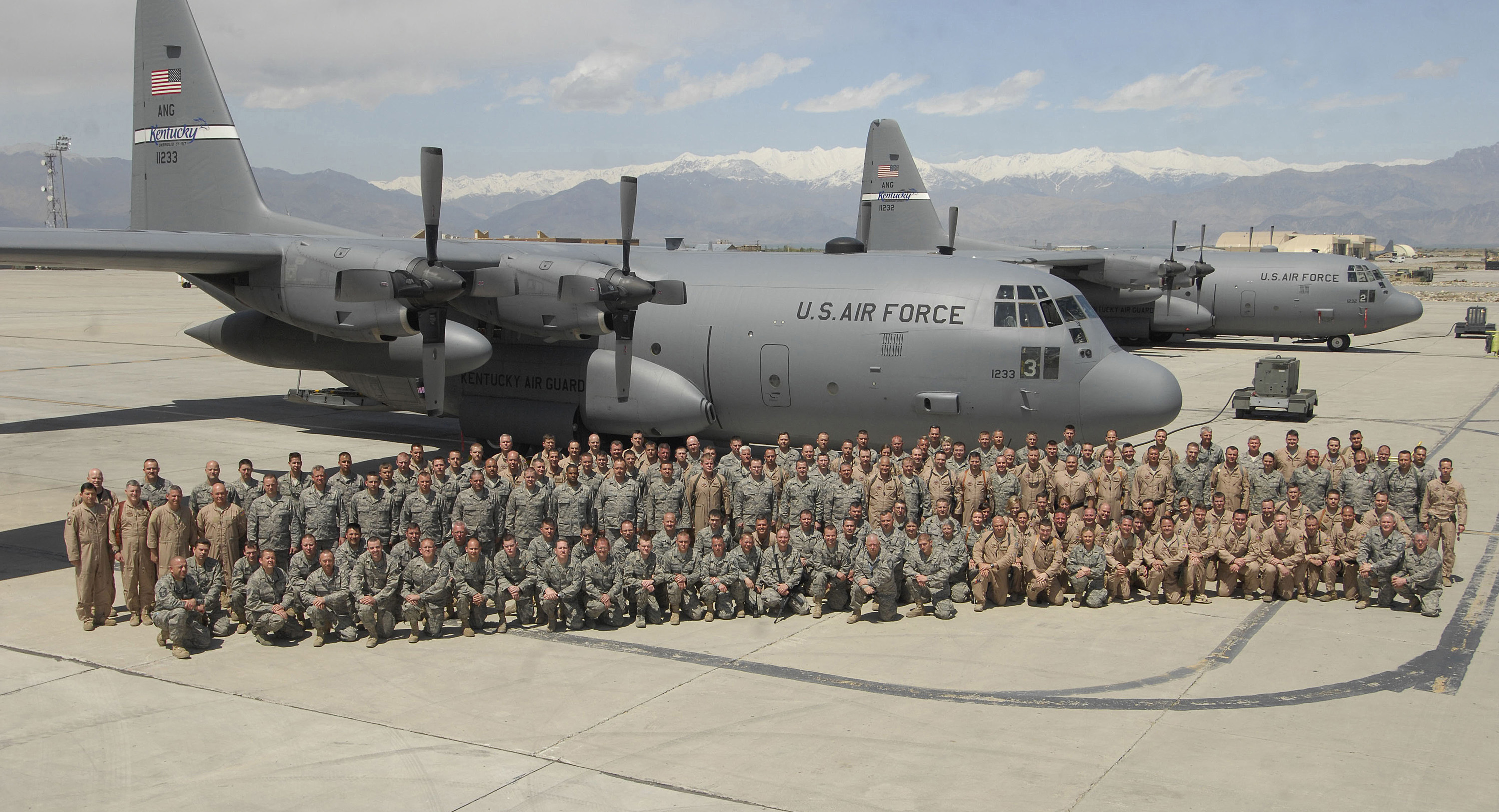
Deployed members of the 123rd Airlift Wing pose with their Lockheed C-130H Hercules aircraft on a flightline in Afghanistan, 22 April 2009.

The unit maintained an unprecedented 100 percent mission-capable rate during the deployment, never missing a single scheduled flight due to aircraft maintenance issues while completing more than 1,500 combat sorties that delivered 3,900 tons of cargo and transported 20,000 troops throughout the theater of operations. The wing also deployed more than 120 Airmen and two C-130 aircraft to the Caribbean in support of Operation Coronet Oak, an ongoing U.S. Southern Command mission to provide theater airlift capability for U.S. military and government agencies in Central and South America.

A third major overseas deployment saw more than 200 Kentucky Air Guardsmen and three C-130 aircraft deploy to Ramstein Air Base, Germany, from January through March 2008 and August through September 2009 as part of Operation Joint Enterprise. Kentucky aircrews transported more than 200 tons of cargo and 700 troops to 18 nations across Europe and Africa during their tours.

==== BRAC 2005 ====
In its BRAC 2005 recommendations, DoD recommended to realign Berry Field Air National Guard Base, Nashville, Tennessee. This recommendation would distribute the C-130H Hercules aircraft of the 118th Airlift Wing to the 123d Airlift Wing (four aircraft) and another installation. Military judgment was the predominant factor in this recommendation—this realignment would create one right-sized squadron at Louisville (79) and would retain experienced ANG personnel.

== Lineage ==
- Constituted as the 368th Fighter Squadron on 20 December 1942

Activated on 15 January 1943
Inactivated on 10 November 1945
Redesignated 165th Fighter Squadron and allotted to the National Guard on 24 May 1946
Extended federal recognition on 16 February 1947
Federalized and ordered to active service on 10 October 1950
Redesignated 165th Fighter-Bomber Squadron on 1 November 1951
Inactivated, released from active duty and returned to Kentucky state control on 10 July 1952
Redesignated 165th Fighter-Interceptor Squadron, 10 July 1952
Redesignated 165th Fighter-Bomber Squadron on 1 January 1953
Redesignated 165th Tactical Reconnaissance Squadron on 1 June 1957
Federalized and ordered to active service on 26 January 1968
Released from active duty and returned to Kentucky state control on 9 June 1969
Redesignated 165th Tactical Airlift Squadron on 8 January 1989
Redesignated 165th Airlift Squadron, 16 March 1992

=== Assignments ===
- 359th Fighter Group, 15 January 1943 – 10 November 1945
- 123d Fighter Group (later 123d Fighter-Bomber Group), 16 February 1947 – 10 July 1952
- 123d Fighter-Interceptor Group (later 123d Fighter-Bomber Group, 123d Tactical Reconnaissance Group), 10 July 1952
- 123d Tactical Reconnaissance Wing, 26 January 1968 (attached to 363d Tactical Reconnaissance Wing March–May 1968)
- 123d Tactical Reconnaissance Group, 9 June 1969
- 123d Tactical Reconnaissance Wing (later 123d Tactical Airlift Wing), 8 January 1974
- 123d Operations Group, 16 March 1992 – present

=== Stations ===
- Westover Field, Massachusetts, 15 January 1943
- Grenier Field, New Hampshire, 7 April 1943
- Republic Field, New York, 26 May 1943
- Westover Field, Massachusetts, 24 Aug – 2 October 1943
- RAF East Wretham (AAF-133), England, c. 19 October 1943 – c. 4 November 1945
- Camp Kilmer, New Jersey, 9–10 November 1945
- Standiford Field, Kentucky, 16 February 1947
- Godman Air Force Base, Kentucky, 10 October 1950
- RAF Manston, England, 30 November 1951 – 10 July 1952
- Standiford Field, Kentucky, 10 July 1952
- Richards-Gebaur Air Force Base, Missouri, 26 January 1968
- Standiford Field (later Louisville International Airport, Louisville Air National Guard Base), Kentucky, 9 June 1969 – present

=== Aircraft ===
- P-47D Thunderbolt, 1943–1944
- P-51D (later F-51D( Mustang, 1944–1945, 1946–1951, 1952–1956
- F-84E Thunderjet, 1951–1952
- F-86A Sabre, 1956–1957
- RB-57A Canberra, 1957–1965
- RF-101G Voodoo, 1965–1971
- RF-101H Voodoo, 1971–1976
- RF-4C Phantom II, 1976–1989
- C-130B Hercules, 1989–1992
- C-130H Hercules, 1992–2021
- C-130J Super Hercules, 2021–present
