= UFO flap =

Sudden increase in UFO reports over a period of time

A UFO flap is a rash of reports of unidentified airborne objects. Flap, originally a military term to describe a "period of panic or chaos", is used by ufologists to describe surges of sightings in one geographical area. Longer surges spanning multiple countries may be called waves. Reported sightings of UFOs, public interest in them, and news coverage are highly variable in frequency. The terms UFO, flap, and wave allow for sightings of various unrelated phenomena in the night sky to be discussed as if they are parts of the same aerial event.

Documenting the provenance of the idea of a UFO flap, Wired journalist Sarah Scoles identified how the term was first associated with the 1947 flying saucer craze:

Arnold's sighting, however he felt about it, began an epidemic. Soon, other people around the US started to see their saucers. The night sky opened up, kicking off a ufological period insiders refer to as a "flap": a period of increased sightings. The term also has the contextual tinge of the word's other definition, "an increased state of agitation." Edward Ruppelt, an Air Force officer who would go on to be part of governmental UFO investigations, wrote that "in Air Force terminology a 'flap' is a condition, or situation, or state of being of a group of people characterized by an advanced degree of confusion that has not quite yet reached panic proportions." In this case, the people were not yet panicking about strange sights in the sky.

If Arnold hadn't said a word, history probably would have nevertheless been set on a similar course. Someone else's sighting would likely have catalyzed a similar flap—a year later, maybe two, or five. All events unfold in a cultural medium, after all. And the medium of Arnold's time—colored by the fear of outsiders, fear of invasions, and awe of technology, just like today—was fertile ufological ground. Perhaps, in a world without Arnold's encounter, people would have described "the phenomenon" differently. Perhaps we wouldn't have the term "flying saucer" at all. Maybe it would have been pancakes or spheres. But Arnold and saucers are what we've got. So the flap that followed—and, really, all flaps to follow—bear his imprint, however faint.

UFO flaps can be exacerbated by hoaxers taking advantage of the flurry of interest.

Historian Curtis Peebles notes that flaps seem to coincide with periods of social unrest.

== Notable flaps ==
Flap has been used to describe spates of UFO reports such as:

- Mystery airship wave of 1896–1897 in the US
- Foo fighters of World War II
- Ghost rockets of 1946 in Sweden and Finland
- 1947 flying disc craze in the US
  - Kenneth Arnold UFO sighting
  - Flight 105 UFO sighting
  - Roswell incident
  - Rhodes UFO photographs
  - Twin Falls saucer hoax
  - Maury Island hoax
- 1952 UFO Flap
  - Wonsan-Sunchon UFO incident
  - Have We Visitors From Space?
  - Passaic UFO photographs
  - 1952 Washington, D.C., UFO incident
  - The Report on Unidentified Flying Objects
- Great 1954 Greek UFO flap
- Michigan "swamp gas" UFO reports in the US
- 1967 UFO flap in Britain
- 1973 flap in the US south
  - Pascagoula incident
- 1977 Colares flap in Brazil
- 1984 Hudson Valley UFO sightings in the US
- Gulf Breeze UFO incident of 1987–88 in the US
- Belgian UFO wave of 1989–90
- 1994 Michigan UFO event
- Phoenix Lights of 1997
- 2024 Northeastern United States drone sightings

== See also ==
- Extraterrestrial hypothesis, which argues UFO reports are best explained as interplanetary or interstellar space ships.
- Psychosocial hypothesis, which argues UFO reports are best explained by social contagion
- UFO conspiracy theories
