= 1994 Michigan UFO event =

Apparent UFO sighting

On 8 March 1994, dozens of individuals reported sighting multiple UFOs in West Michigan, United States. The UFOs were described as resembling flickering Christmas lights, consisting of five to six cylindrical or circular objects with blue, red, white, and green lights.

== Radar data ==
On 11 March, the press covered comments from the official in charge at the local National Weather Service office, who acknowledged radar data suggesting a "fast moving phenomenon" over Lake Michigan on 8 March. He reported the sighting to the National UFO Reporting Center, and relayed eyewitness reports that featured "red and green sets of lights" that performed "some rather erratic movements at times". The sightings were reported to 911 and were observed by police and a National Weather Service radar at Muskegon County Airport.

== Witnesses ==
Reports of sightings of 8 March were followed by a subsequent "UFO flap". According to Chicago Tribune, in the aftermath, UFO sightings were reported by over 300 witnesses in 42 counties of Michigan (including Muskegon, Ottawa, Berrien, and Allegan counties).

== Interpretations ==
On 20 March, experts from the National Weather Service dismissed the radar blips, noting their radar was designed to sense weather, not aircraft. Press speculated that the sightings could have been caused by a top-secret US aircraft, though aviation experts expressed skepticism. Press similarly covered a psychologist who opined the sightings were caused by social contagion, likening them to various examples of subjective pareidolia and misinterpretation. The Detroit Free Press reported that residents of the very-religious Holland, Michigan, were interpreting the sightings as a biblical sign.

== Assessment by the Mutual UFO Network ==
By 20 March, the Mutual UFO Network spokesperson told press they had received over 100 UFO reports in lower Michigan since the initial sightings on 8 March. The group interviewed dozens of witnesses, but the event remains unexplained. The group claims to have ruled out most earthly explanations, such as a small plane, gas, blimp, weather balloon, satellite, shooting star, military aircraft, or debris.

== Radar operator ==
In 1996, Jack Bushong, the radar operator that night, began speaking publicly about the incident. Bushong recalled having been called by a 911 dispatcher around 10 that night. In 2008, he appeared on the show UFO Hunters. In 2019, on the 25th anniversary of the event, local media interviewed witness Cindy Pravda. In 2020, retired meteorologist Jack Bushong was interviewed about his experiences at the National Weather Service station the night of 8 March 1994. In 2021, Bushong reported that he "felt vindicated" by a recent government UFO report. The event was detailed on an episode of the Netflix series Unsolved Mysteries in 2022; Bushong was featured. In 2024, Bushong recalled using the WSR-74C radar to scan the skies in response to the dispatcher call.

== See also ==
- UFO sightings in the United States
