= Wonsan-Sunchon UFO incident =

1952 incident in Korea

Map of Korea showing the location of Wonsan and Sunchon, about 300 miles (480 km) apart.

On the night of 29 January 1952, amid the Korean War, four American military personnel aboard two different B-29 bombers reported seeing an orange, globe-shaped light over two different cities in northern Korea: Wonsan and Sunchon. Air Force UFO experts argue that widespread reporting of the incident contributed to the 1952 UFO flap that culminated in sightings over the nation's capital.

== Background ==
Since the start of the Cold War in June 1947, reports of unidentified skyborne objects had triggered fears the reports might represent new Soviet technology. Three years later, in June 1950, Communist North Korea launched a military invasion of South Korea, igniting the Korean War. The United States and its allies directly intervened, soon matched by the direct involvement of Chinese forces.

The Wonsan incident occurred during a stalemate in the Korean War. The Communist-controlled port city of Wonsan was under naval blockade by the U.S. Navy and its allies. Meanwhile, Sunchon was the site of a major air battle in which new Soviet-made supersonic jet fighters defeated their UN counterparts.

== Incident ==
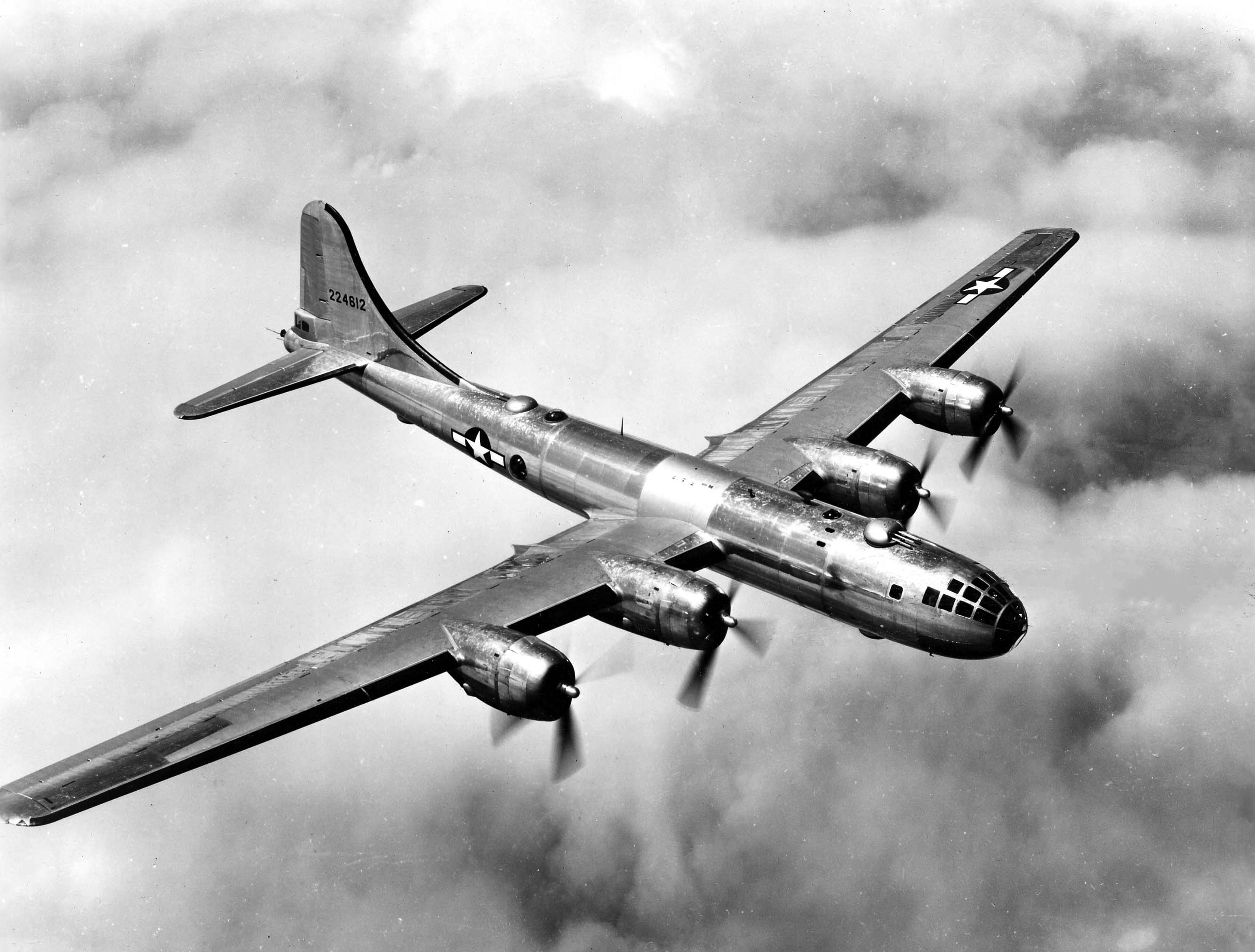
A B-29 in flight

Around midnight on 29 January 1952, a B-29 Superfortress was travelling at 20,000 feet (6,100 m) over Wonsan when the rear gunner and central fire control gunner both spotted an unusual orange light. They described the light as globe- or disc-shaped, which occasionally emitted blue flames like those of a cooking stove. They estimated the light was about three feet (0.91 m) in diameter, though they could not be sure of its distance and, thus, its size. The object reportedly remained near the bomber for at least five minutes, during which the bomber was travelling at 200 miles per hour (320 km/h).

The sighting was apparently corroborated by the crew of a second B-29 bomber from a different squadron based hundreds of miles away in Sunchon. They reported that a lighted orange sphere followed them for a full minute as they flew back to base.

== Publicity and legacy ==
On 19 February, United Press's account of the incident was covered in papers nationwide. Syndicated columnist team Joseph and Stewart Alsop reported the Air Force was taking the incident seriously, writing: "Here is a tale, in source at least, not laughable but close to laughable in substance, which is not being laughed off". The pair wrote that "the Korean experience has convinced American experts of our earlier folly in underestimating Soviet technical capabilities… for example information has come in of Russian production of a genuinely supersonic jet fighter". The Huron Plainsman opined by quoting Shakespeare's Hamlet: "There are more things in heaven and earth, Horatio, than are dreamt of in your philosophy". On 21 February, United Press reported that members of the House Armed Services Committee were reluctant to open a congressional inquiry into the incident, preferring to let the Air Force investigate instead.

By 22 February, Lt. Gen. Otto P. Weyland, commander of the Far East Air Forces, released a statement about the incident and confirmed an ongoing investigation. Said Weyland: "We can’t say there’s nothing to it, but unless we can get more data, I don’t think we can expect a conclusive answer." Weyland was skeptical that a jet was responsible, saying "You’d have to be looking right up the tail pipe of a jet to see the glow and I can’t say that I ever have." In March, the incident was covered in Time magazine. On 7 April, the incident was covered in Life magazine, then the most widely-read magazine in the nation.

In 1956, retired Project Bluebook chief Edward J. Ruppelt recalled that the incident "didn't start a rash of reports like the story of the first UFO sighting did back in June 1947, but it was significant in that it started a slow build-up of publicity that was to far surpass anything in the past." Writing in the 1990s, historian Curtis Peebles agreed that reports of the Korea sightings were the first large-scale publicity about UFOs in years and contributed to the 1952 wave of reports.
