= Pascagoula incident =

Alleged 1973 alien abduction in Mississippi

Coordinates: 30°22′12″N 88°33′52″W

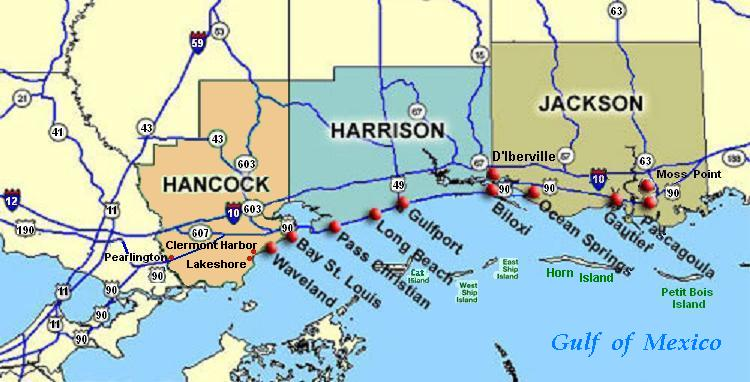
Map showing coastal route US 90, connecting Pascagoula with Ocean Springs, Mississippi.

The Pascagoula incident was an alleged UFO close encounter reported by Charles Hickson and Calvin Parker, who claimed that while fishing near Pascagoula, Mississippi, they were taken aboard a UFO and examined by aliens before being released. The primary claimant, Charles Hickson, would go on to become a UFO celebrity, alleging ongoing contact with the beings and appearing on national television.

== Incident ==
The Pascagoula incident took place amid the 1973 UFO flap – a spate of UFO reports in the US South, particularly Louisiana and Mississippi.

External audio
- October 11, 1973 recording of Hickson and Parker

Around 8:00 pm on October 11, service station operator Larry Booth called the sheriff to report seeing a strange craft with a blinking, colored light pass overhead. Around 11:00 pm, 45-year-old Charles Hickson and his 17-year-old relative Calvin Parker arrived at the Jackson County, Mississippi sheriff's office to report a strange encounter. According to Hickson, the pair had been fishing off a pier on the west bank of the Pascagoula River when they heard a whirring/whizzing sound, saw two flashing blue lights, and observed an oval-shaped object 30–40 feet (9–12 m) across and 8–10 feet (2–3 m) high. Hickson explained that the young Parker fainted and remained unconscious during the examination. Hickson claimed three "creatures" with "pincers" took them aboard the object and subjected them to an examination, before returning them to the wharf.

According to the pair, they initially decided not to report the incident but instead went to the office of The Mississippi Press of Pascagoula to share their story. On learning no newsmen were present, the pair continued on to the sheriff's office to make a report. Captain Glenn Ryder later told the press that he was initially skeptical and suspected a prank but soon came to believe the men were sincere. Ryder smelled alcohol on Hickson's breath, but Hickson explained he had only drunk whiskey after being released. Ryder told the press that the men were not drunk. Officers left Hickson and Parker alone in a room, secretly recording the conversation between the two hoping to catch them in a lie, but their stories remained consistent with their original testimony.

On October 12, 1973, The Mississippi Press reported on the two men who claimed to have been taken on board a UFO by strange creatures the previous night.

== Publicity and later activities ==
The two men scheduled a press conference for 11:15 am on October 12, but it was cancelled. That same day, the Associated Press and United Press International wire services picked up the story, which was covered in papers nationwide. The two men were examined at Keesler Air Force Base, cleared of radiation exposure, and released. Locals called for federal officials to investigate. Ufologist James Harder and debunker-turned-ufologist J. Allen Hynek traveled to Mississippi and interviewed the two men, separately, under hypnosis. They told the press that the accounts were likely based on fact.

By October 17, the press documented subsequent UFO reports in the wake of nationwide attention. Two days later, an article under the pair's name appeared in the local paper, which argued the creatures were robotic and friendly. An artist's conception of a "creature" was published in Biloxi the following day. Meanwhile, the pair agreed to tell their story to the local Rotary Club. It was also reported the pair were slated to take lie detector tests. By October 24, the press was comparing the case to the Betty and Barney Hill abduction. According to local journalists, the two men had not been seen at their workplace, prompting speculation they were being paid to tell their story. Sixteen days after the original event, the press confirmed an upcoming polygraph, and four days later, it was reported that a local polygraph examiner had concluded Hickson "told the truth as to what he believed", cautioning "we do not say a space ship landed or that creatures emerged from it." The use of the polygraph as a lie detector was discredited by the 1980s. Through an attorney, Parker declined to take a polygraph unless requested by Hickson. The attorney said Parker had recently been hospitalized. Hickson appeared on the November 2 episode of The Dick Cavett Show, three days after a Los Angeles radio station advertised an exclusive interview with the two men. On November 8, The Mississippi Press reported that a fisherman and his 14-year-old son claimed to have seen an illuminated object underwater in the same river. On November 29, Hickson appeared at a taping of The Mike Douglas Show; the episode aired in syndication in late December. Hickson also appeared on the Tonight Show Starring Johnny Carson.

In January, Hickson was arrested for public drunkenness after being found wandering along a highway. In April, Hickson traveled to Detroit to address a UFO group. That month, Hickson told the press that he was in ongoing contact with the beings, having had three different encounters. Hickson teased that the being would soon provide a message along with proof of their existence which he would relay to Washington. Later in April, Hickson met with "ancient astronauts" proponent Eric von Däniken. Hickson gave interviews and lectures, and appeared on television (including an episode of the game show To Tell The Truth).

External videos
- Hickson on To Tell The Truth

In 1974, Hickson claimed additional encounters with aliens. In October 1974, Hickson was described as a "UFO celebrity" who would be featured in an upcoming NBC documentary. "We did everything we knew to try to break their stories," Jackson County sheriff's Capt. Glen Ryder told The Washington Post in 1975. "If they were lying to me, they should be in Hollywood." In 1983, Hickson authored a self-published book, UFO Contact at Pascagoula.

Parker later attended UFO conventions. In 1993, he started a company called "UFO Investigations" to produce television stories about UFOs.

=== Legacy ===
In September 2011, Hickson died of a heart attack at the age of 80.

In 2018, Parker released his book, entitled Pascagoula: The Closest Encounter, My Story, which is "the first full account of the event given by Parker along with how it affected his life". On June 22, 2019, a historical marker was unveiled at the site of the alleged abduction, funded by the historical society and with placement approved by the city. Parker attended the unveiling, as did Hickson's son and family. Parker stated, "It is emotional for me. I can't really describe it because I would break out in tears if I do. I wish when I died I could be buried right here underneath this plaque, that would explain it the best. It is quite an honor." Parker died from kidney cancer in August 2023 at the age of 68.

In 2024, Netflix's Files of the Unexplained covered the incident.

The City of Pascagoula hosts a festival every year in October to mark the anniversary of the incident.

== Skepticism ==
Aviation journalist and UFO skeptic Philip J. Klass found "discrepancies" in Hickson's story, noted that Hickson refused to take a polygraph exam conducted by an experienced examiner, and concluded that the case was a hoax. Skeptical investigator Joe Nickell wrote that Hickson's behavior was "questionable" and that Hickson later altered or embellished his claims. Nickell speculated that Hickson may have fantasized the alien encounter during a hypnagogic "waking dream state", and suggested that Parker's corroboration of the tale was likely due to suggestibility because he initially told police he had "passed out at the beginning of the incident and failed to regain consciousness until it was over". The claim that Parker had temporarily lapsed into unconsciousness was supported by Hickson during his To Tell the Truth appearance.

== See also ==
- Alien abduction
- List of UFO sightings
- UFO sightings in the United States
