= Trinity UFO Case =

Claimed UFO crash at Trinity Atomic Bomb site

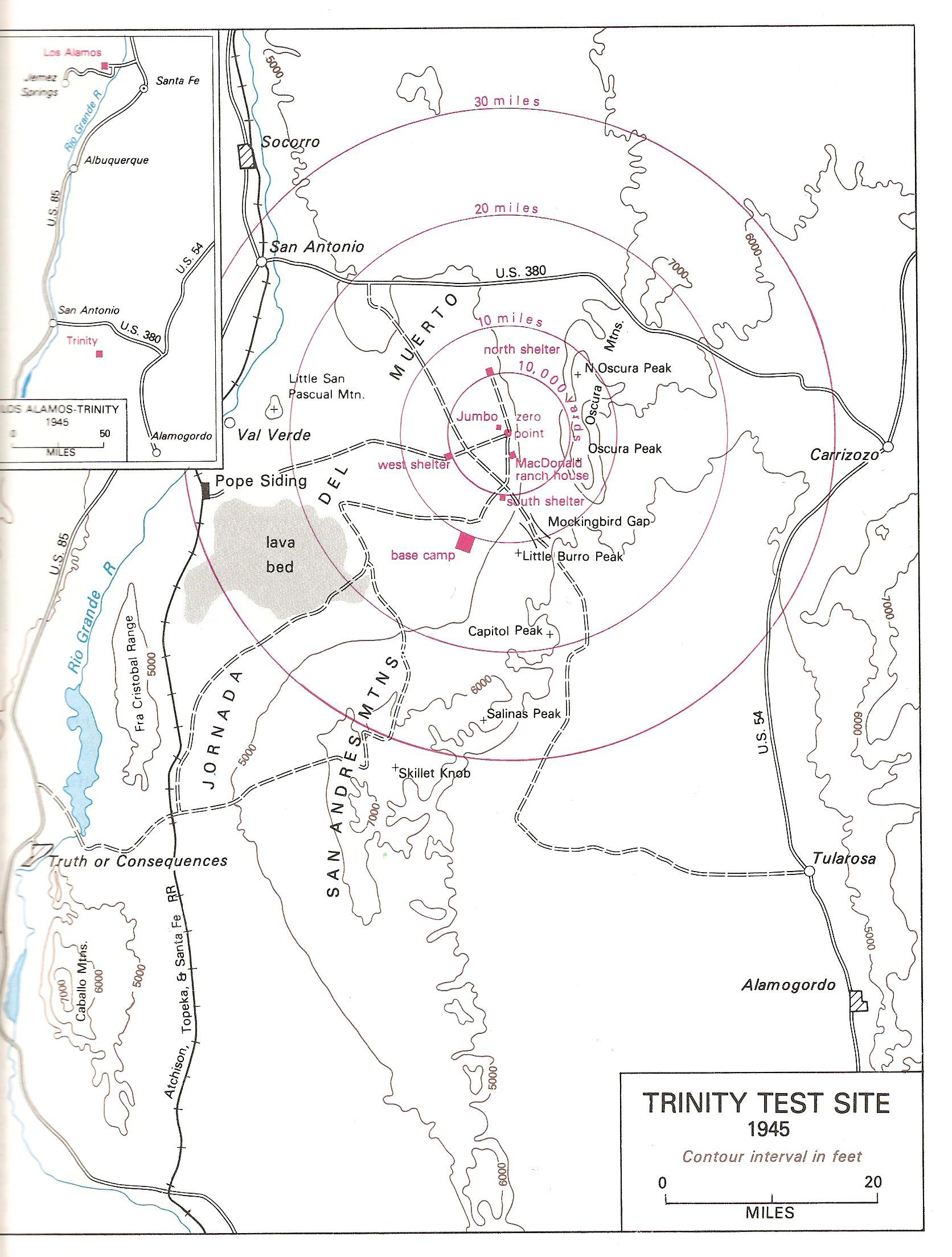
Map of Trinity test site

The Trinity UFO case is a crashed UFO story set in August 1945 near the Trinity test site where the first atomic bomb had been detonated five weeks prior. According to the legend, an "avocado-shaped object" struck a communications tower near the site, two boys found what they described as “little creatures” in the wreckage, but all evidence was subsequently removed by the US military and the boys were warned not to talk about it. The story first arose in 2003 and was later publicized by ufologist Jacques Vallée.

== Story ==
According to Brian Dunning, claims about the Trinity UFO first arose in 2003, when the Mountain Mail of Socorro, New Mexico, published a story by local reporter Ben Moffett. In it, Moffett documented the claims of Reme Baca and Jose Padilla, two men who grew up near the Trinity test site during the 1940s. According to the story, on August 16, 1945, 7-year old Baca and 9-year-old Padilla were hunting for a lost cow on the Padilla ranch when they saw a large flash and came upon a debris field containing a metallic craft shaped like an avocado with "small humanoid creatures" moving in the wreckage. According to the two men, they returned to the site two days later with Padilla's father and state police officer Eddie Apodaca, but found no sign of any creatures. According to Padilla, a military representative visited their home, advising them that a road would be built on the Padilla property in order to recover the debris of a weather balloon that had crashed there. Baca and Padilla say the recovery operation lasted several days, and claim to have kept small pieces of the debris for themselves. In 2011, Reme Baca and Jose Padilla self-published Born on the Edge of Ground Zero, a memoir of their boyhood living near the Trinity site during the 1940s, in which they recounted the story.

== Trinity: The Best-Kept Secret ==
In 2021, two UFOlogists, Jacques Vallée and Paola Harris, self-published Trinity: The Best-Kept Secret. In the book, Vallée argues that there are "obvious similarities" between the Trinity UFO story and the Roswell incident. The book contains a re-telling of the story by Baca and Padilla, detailing their claims of seeing three creatures about one and a half meters (4.9 ft) tall whose appearance is described as "similar to a praying mantis, or a Jerusalem cricket, with pear-shaped heads".

According to the book, Padilla's father and state police officer Eddie Apodaca later warned the boys not to talk about what they had seen, and that when a soldier named "Sergeant Avila" visited the ranch, he told them it was important that no one knew about the matter and that no one approached the scene. The book also describes Baca and Padilla's claims of seeing the crashed object, described as "metallic" with a transparent dome on top, and an interior containing no furniture, with "memory metal strips" and silver wires among the debris. The book also recounts Baca and Padilla's claims of taking "a souvenir" from the crashed object that "survive[s] to this day".

== Criticism ==
According to skeptic Brian Dunning, the story by Baca and Padilla was well known as a hoax, "a literal hoax, made up by people who knew they were making it up — not a distorted memory, not an honestly misinterpreted experience — but a straight-up hoax." Dunning cited reports that Eddie Apodaca "supposedly the state trooper who picked through the wreckage with the family, had actually been in Europe fighting in World War II at the time". Dunning concludes "The evidence that does exist proves that Reme Baca pitched multiple different versions of a story to multiple UFO authors until finally getting one published. The constantly changing story elements, the total lack of evidence or of any corroborating sources, and both Baca and Padilla's histories of lying about themselves, leave little reason for anything in the Trinity UFO story to be taken seriously."

== See also ==
- Aztec, New Mexico crashed saucer hoax
- Green fireballs
- Kirtland AFB UFO sighting
- Lonnie Zamora incident
- Roswell incident
