= Kentucky Air National Guard =

Unit of the US Air National Guard for the State of Kentucky

- Emblem of the Kentucky Air National Guard
- Founded: 16 February 1947
- Country: United States
- Allegiance: Kentucky
- Branch: Air National Guard
- Type: State militia, military reserve force
- Role: "To meet commonwealth and federal mission responsibilities."
- Part of: Kentucky National Guard; United States National Guard Bureau
- Garrison/HQ: Kentucky Air National Guard, 1101 New Grade Lane, Louisville, Kentucky, 40213
- Website: 123aw.ang.af.mil

Commanders
- Civilian leadership: President Donald Trump (Commander-in-Chief); Troy Meink (Secretary of the Air Force); Governor Andy Beshear (Governor of the Commonwealth of Kentucky)
- Commonwealth military leadership: Brigadier General Haldane B. Lamberton

Aircraft flown
- Transport: Lockheed C-130 Hercules

The Kentucky Air National Guard (KY ANG) is the aerial militia of the U.S. state of Kentucky. It is a reserve of the United States Air Force and along with the Kentucky Army National Guard, an element of the Kentucky National Guard of the larger United States National Guard Bureau.

As commonwealth militia units, the units in the Kentucky Air National Guard are not in the normal United States Air Force chain of command. They are under the jurisdiction of the governor of Kentucky through the office of the Kentucky Adjutant General unless they are federalized by order of the president of the United States. The Kentucky Air National Guard is headquartered at Louisville Air National Guard Base, and its commander is Brigadier General Dave Mounkes.

== Overview ==
Under the "Total Force" concept, Kentucky Air National Guard units are considered to be Air Reserve Components (ARC) of the United States Air Force (USAF). Kentucky ANG units are trained and equipped by the Air Force and are operationally gained by a major command of the USAF if federalized. In addition, the Kentucky Air National Guard forces are assigned to Air Expeditionary Forces and are subject to deployment tasking orders along with their active duty and Air Force Reserve counterparts in their assigned cycle deployment window.

Along with their federal reserve obligations, as commonwealth militia units the elements of the Kentucky ANG are subject to being activated by order of the governor to provide protection of life and property, and preserve peace, order and public safety. Commonwealth missions include disaster relief in times of earthquakes, hurricanes, floods and forest fires, search and rescue, protection of vital public services, and support to civil defense.

== Components ==
The Kentucky Air National Guard consists of the following major unit:

- 123rd Airlift Wing

Established 16 February 1947 (as: 165th Fighter Squadron); operates: C-130J Hercules
Stationed at: Louisville Air National Guard Base
Gained by: Air Mobility Command

== History ==
On 24 May 1946, the United States Army Air Forces, in response to dramatic postwar military budget cuts imposed by President Harry S. Truman, allocated inactive unit designations to the National Guard Bureau for the formation of an Air Force National Guard. These unit designations were allotted and transferred to various state National Guard bureaus to provide them unit designations to re-establish them as Air National Guard units.

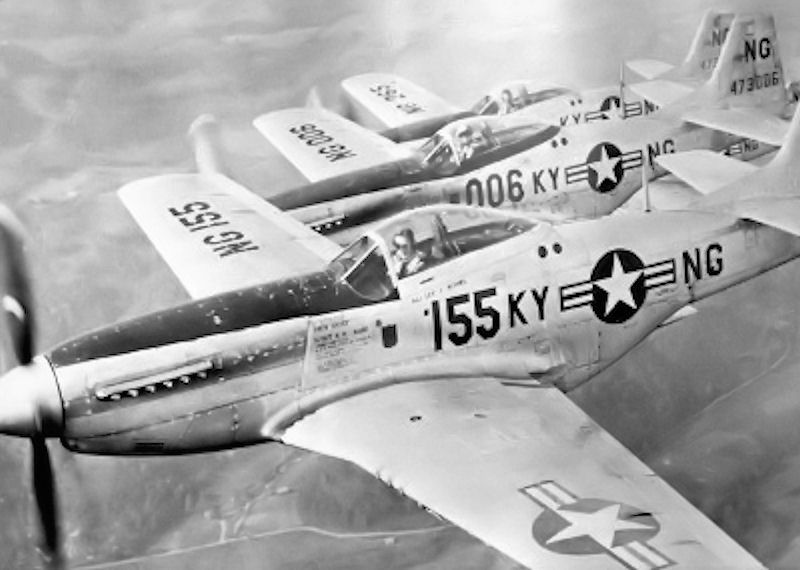
Formation of P-51 Mustangs of the 165th Fighter Squadron, 1947

The Kentucky Air National Guard origins date to 9 June 1947 with the establishment of the 123d Fighter Group and is oldest unit of the Kentucky Air National Guard. It was federally recognized and activated at Standiford Field, near Louisville. Its 165th Fighter Squadron, the flying component of the 123d, was equipped with P-51D Mustangs. Its mission was the air defense of the state. 18 September 1947, however, is considered the Kentucky Air National Guard's official birth concurrent with the establishment of the United States Air Force as a separate branch of the United States military under the National Security Act of 1947.

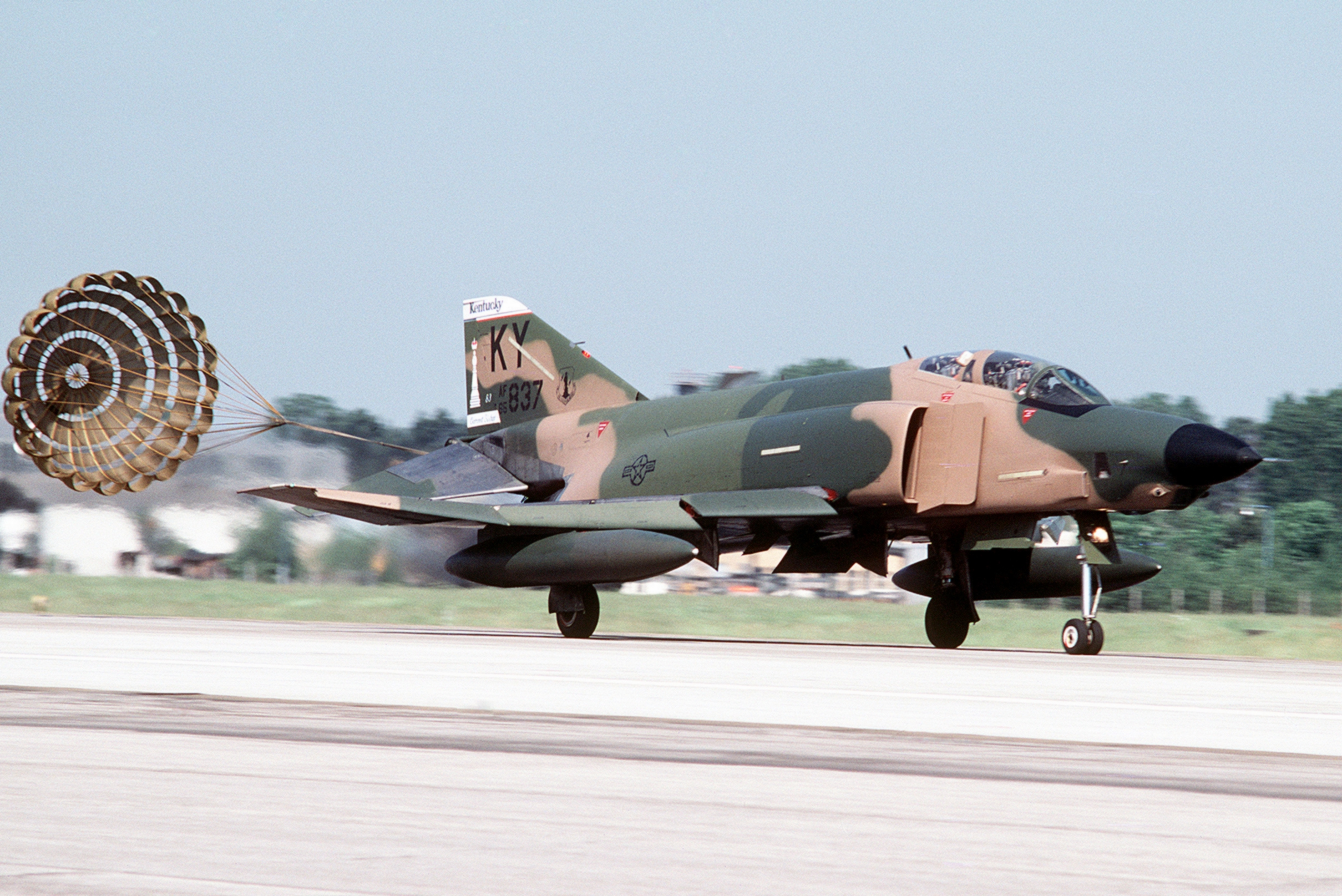
RF-4C Phantom II of the 165th Tactical Reconnaissance Squadron lands at Ingolstadt Air Base in Germany, 1983

With the surprise invasion of South Korea on 25 June 1950, and the regular military's complete lack of readiness, the ANG was mobilized into federal active duty. The 165th Fighter Squadron was federalized and ordered to active duty on 10 October 1950. The squadron was moved to Godman Air Force Base at Fort Knox along with the 123d Fighter Group. At Godman, the squadron was joined by the North Carolina ANG 156th Fighter Squadron and the West Virginia ANG 167th Fighter Squadron. All three squadrons were equipped with P-51Ds. After over a year of training at Godman AFB, the 123d was re-designated as a Fighter-Bomber Group and deployed to RAF Manston, Kent, England to replace the Strategic Air Command 12th Fighter-Escort Wing which was returned to Bergstrom AFB, Texas. In England, the mission of the 123d was to provide fighter escort for SAC B-50 Superfortress and B-36 Peacemaker bombers while flying over Western European airspace on their deterrence alert missions. The 123d left their P-51Ds at Godman AFB and the personnel boarded C-124 Globemaster II transports to England where they initially began conversion training on F-84E Thunderjets.

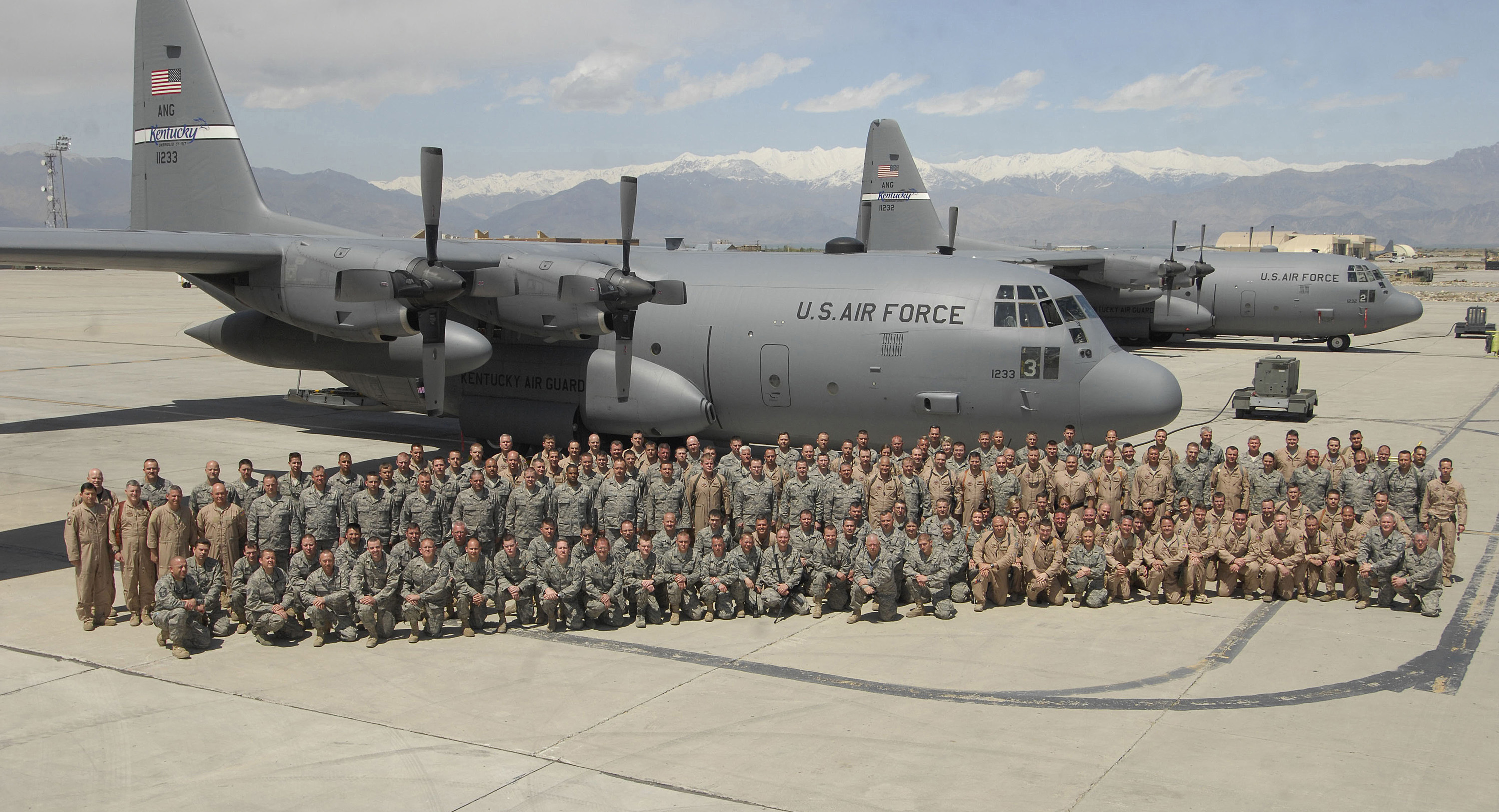
Kentucky Air National Guardsmen with C-130Hs in Afghanistan, 2009

Today, the 123d Airlift Wing (123 AW) provides worldwide theater airlift for U.S. military and humanitarian operations. The wing is equipped with eight C-130H2.5 model aircraft. The 123rd Airlift Wing will receive a squadron of eight new C-130J Super Hercules aircraft, replacing its current fleet of the C-130H Hercules models which the unit has flown since 1992.Multiple groups, squadrons and flights carry out the unit's mission by providing administrative and logistical support, including airlift operations, combat control, pararescue, maintenance, supply, transportation, contracting, communications, civil engineering, personnel, base services, security forces and medical functions.

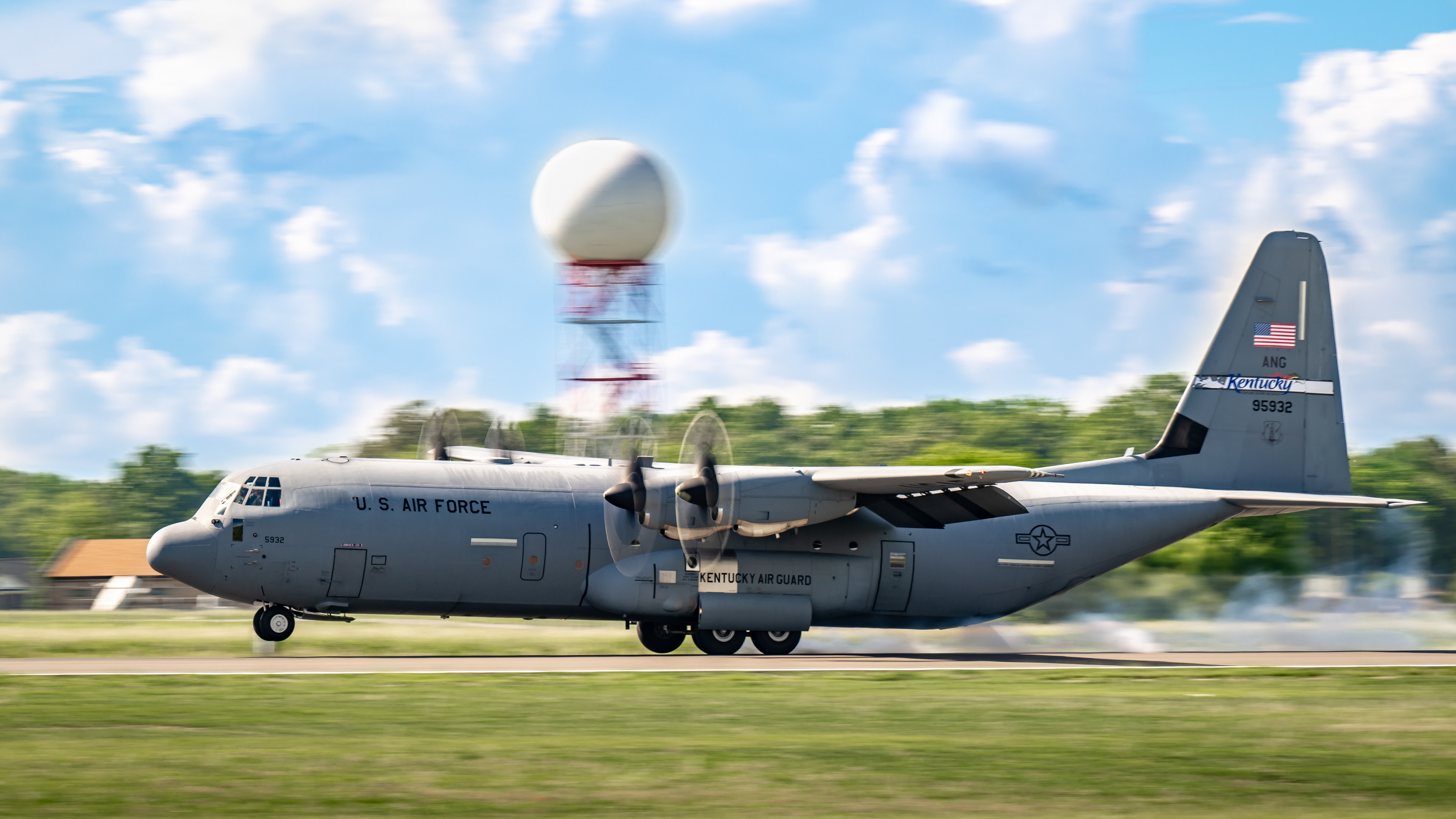
165th Airlift Squadron C-130J Super Hercules lands at Barkley Regional Airport in 2025

Since the September 11th, 2001 terrorist attacks on the United States, elements of every Air National Guard unit in Kentucky have been activated in support of the global war on terrorism. Flight crews, aircraft maintenance personnel, communications technicians, air controllers and air security personnel were engaged in Operation Noble Eagle air defense overflights of major United States cities. Also, Kentucky ANG units have been deployed overseas as part of Operation Enduring Freedom in Afghanistan and Operation Iraqi Freedom in Iraq as well as other locations as directed.

On September 17, 2018, the Kentucky Air National Guard deployed the 123rd Fatality Search and Recovery Team following Hurricane Florence at the request of the North Carolina public health officials. The Kentucky National Guard also deployed two other units in support of relief efforts; the Kentucky Air National Guard's Louisville-based 123rd Special Tactics Squadron and the Kentucky Army National Guard's 63rd Theater Aviation Brigade from Frankfort.

== See also ==
- Kentucky Active Militia
