= Mantell UFO incident =

1948 fighter plane crash purportedly caused by a UFO in Kentucky, US

Coordinates: 36°40′04″N 86°33′28″W

Locations of Fort Knox and Franklin, Kentucky, United States

On 7 January 1948, 25-year-old Captain Thomas F. Mantell, a Kentucky Air National Guard pilot, died when the P-51 Mustang fighter plane he was piloting crashed near Franklin, Kentucky, United States, after being sent in pursuit of an unidentified flying object (UFO). Pursuing the object in a steep climb and disregarding suggestions to level his altitude, Mantell lost consciousness at high altitude from lack of oxygen; his plane went into a downward spiral and crashed. The incident was among the most publicized early UFO reports. Later investigation by Edward J. Ruppelt, Head of United States Air Force's Project Blue Book found that observations from an airforce base control tower, particularly of "a parachute" and "an ice cream cone tipped with red", as well as an astronomer at Vanderbilt University who reported "a pear-shaped balloon with cables and a basket attached", suggested that Mantell died chasing a Skyhook balloon, which in 1948 was a top-secret project that he would not have known about. The Skyhook was likely launched from Clinton County AFB.

== Incident ==
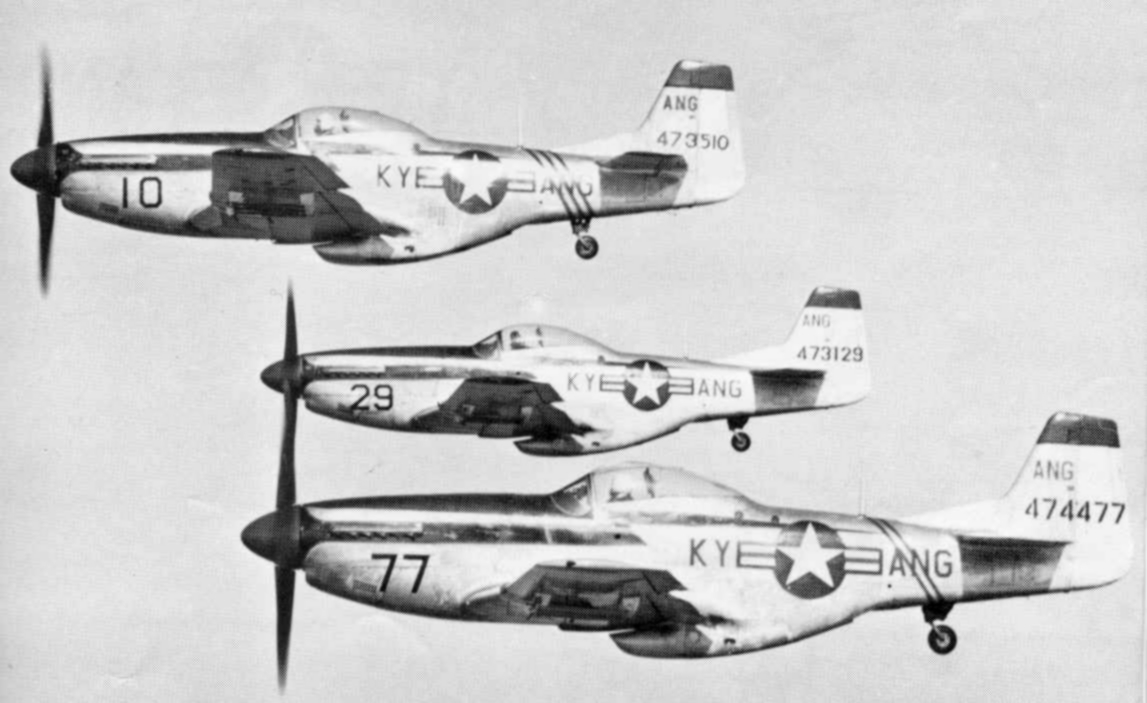
Three F-51D Mustang of the 165th Fighter Squadron, the unit in which Mantell was serving

At 13:15 on 7 January 1948, Godman Army Airfield at Fort Knox, Kentucky, received a call from the Kentucky Highway Patrol of reports of an unusual aerial object near Maysville which could not be immediately identified. At about 13:35 a call was received again with the details of an object which was "circular, about 250 to 300 feet [76 to 91 m] in diameter" and moving with a "pretty good clip" in a westerly direction. At approximately 13:45 the control tower assistant tower operator and then the chief operator at Godman for the first time were able to visually observe the object, which they stated later they had determined was neither an aircraft or weather balloon. Four F-51D Mustangs of C Flight, 165th Fighter Squadron Kentucky Air National Guard, one piloted by Captain Thomas F. Mantell, were told to approach the object. Mantell climbed to 15,000 feet. According to former U.S. Air Force Captain Edward J. Ruppelt, no one at the tower could recall Mantell's description of the object, but "saucer historians have credited him with saying, '...It looks metallic and it's tremendous in size...'" Mantell continued to climb to 22,000 feet (6,700 m), but his wingmen did not follow due to lack of sufficient oxygen equipment and tried to contact him to request he level his ascent. Since Mantell's aircraft also lacked the requisite oxygen equipment for high-altitude flight, the Army later determined that once Mantell passed 25,000 feet (7,600 m) he blacked out from lack of oxygen and his plane began spiraling back towards the ground. Witnesses reported Mantell's Mustang in a circling descent. At 15:50 the control tower at Godman received the report that his plane had crashed on a farm south of Franklin, on Kentucky's border with Tennessee.

== Press coverage and rumors ==
The Mantell incident was reported by newspapers around the nation, and received significant press attention. A number of sensational rumors were also circulated about the crash. According to UFO historian Curtis Peebles, among the rumors were claims that "the flying saucer was a Soviet missile; it was [an alien] spacecraft that shot down [Mantell's fighter] when it got too close; Captain Mantell's body was found riddled with bullets; the body was missing; the plane had completely disintegrated in the air; [and] the wreckage was radioactive." However, no evidence has ever surfaced to substantiate any of these claims, and Air Force investigation rejected some claims, such as the supposedly radioactive wreckage.

Other unsubstantiated rumors reported in news stories including Mantell describing the object as "metallic", Mantell being wounded by a mysterious "ray", and unexplained tiny holes found in his wrecked aircraft; Kehoe and Ruppelt dismissed these rumors.

== Explanations ==
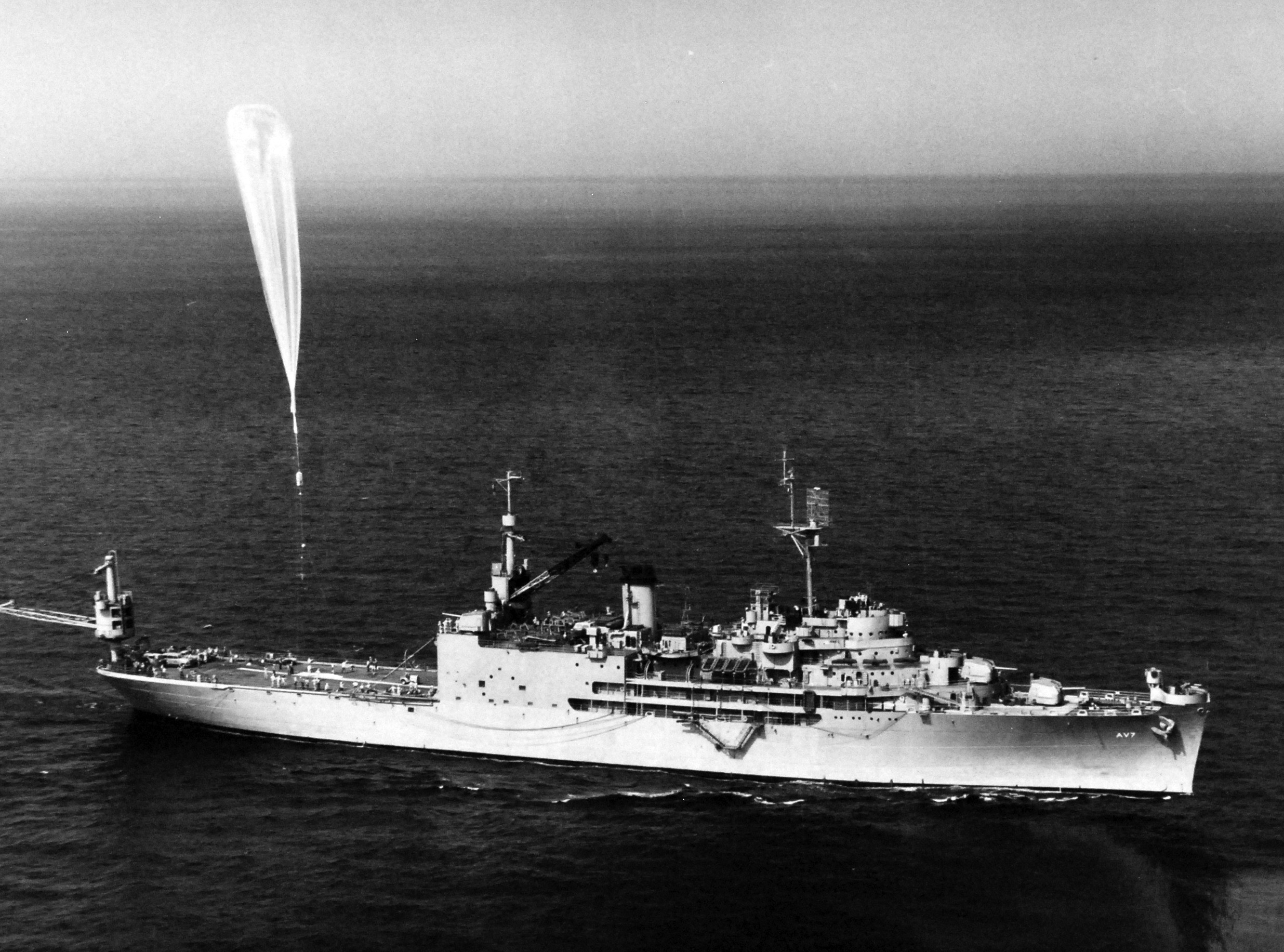
A Skyhook balloon is filled aboard the USS Currituck (AV-7) during operation "Churchy".

Venus had been in the same place in the sky that Mantell's UFO was observed, and the crash was initially thought to have been caused by the pilot mistaking the planet for an unidentified object, a conclusion reached by Project Blue Book investigator J. Allen Hynek in 1948. Hynek later retracted the Venus explanation, concluding it was incorrect because "Venus wasn't bright enough to be seen" by Mantell and the other witnesses, and because a considerable haze was present that would have further obscured the planet in the sky.

In 1952, Project Blue Book identified the object Mantell pursued as a Skyhook balloon, a top-secret project that he would not have known about at the time. The massive spy balloons rose to 100,000 feet (30,000 m). The Army determined that Mantell lost consciousness pursuing one above 20,000 feet (6,100 m) without oxygen. Classified and likely released by another branch of the armed services, the large craft would have been unknown to Mantell or the observers on the ground. A report from Madisonville, Kentucky, identified the object as a balloon after viewing it through a telescope. Carl K. Seyfert, an astronomer at Vanderbilt University, observed the object through binoculars drifting south of Nashville, Tennessee. He described it as "a pear-shaped balloon with cables and a basket attached."

While UFOs are culturally associated with the mysterious, they are often later identified, particularly as balloons. Skyhook sightings were behind many UFO reports during the 1940s and 1950s. The more famous Roswell Incident and 2023 high-altitude sightings were also later attributed to military balloon projects.

== Thomas Mantell ==
Thomas Mantell
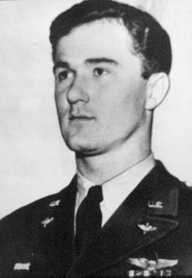
- Kentucky National Guard image of Mantell
- Born: 30 June 1922; Franklin, Kentucky, U.S.
- Died: 7 January 1948 (aged 25) near Franklin, Kentucky, U.S.
- Military career
- Allegiance: United States of America
- Branch: United States Air Force: Kentucky Air National Guard
- Service years: 1942–1948
- Rank: Captain
- Unit: 440th Troop Carrier Group
- Conflicts: World War II (Operation Overlord)
- Awards: Distinguished Flying Cross; Air Medal

Captain Thomas Francis Mantell Jr. (30 June 1922 – 7 January 1948) was a United States Air Force officer and a World War II veteran. He was awarded the Distinguished Flying Cross for courageous action during D-Day, and an Air Medal with three oak leaf clusters for aerial achievement. He was married to Peggy and had two sons, Thomas and Terry. Following his death, Mantell's remains were sent to Louisville for burial in the Zachary Taylor National Cemetery.

=== Career ===
Mantell graduated from Male High School in Louisville. On 16 June 1942, he joined the United States Army Air Corps, the preceding organization to the Air Force, finishing Flight School on 30 June 1943. During World War II, he was a C-47 Skytrain pilot assigned to the 96th Troop Carrier Squadron, 440th Troop Carrier Group, which air dropped the 101st Airborne Division into Normandy on 6 June 1944.

Mantell was awarded the Distinguished Flying Cross for heroism while piloting a C-47 named Vulture's Delight and towing a glider under heavy anti-aircraft fire.

After the war, Mantell returned to Louisville and joined the newly formed Kentucky Air National Guard on 16 February 1947, becoming a F-51D Mustang pilot in the 165th Fighter Squadron.

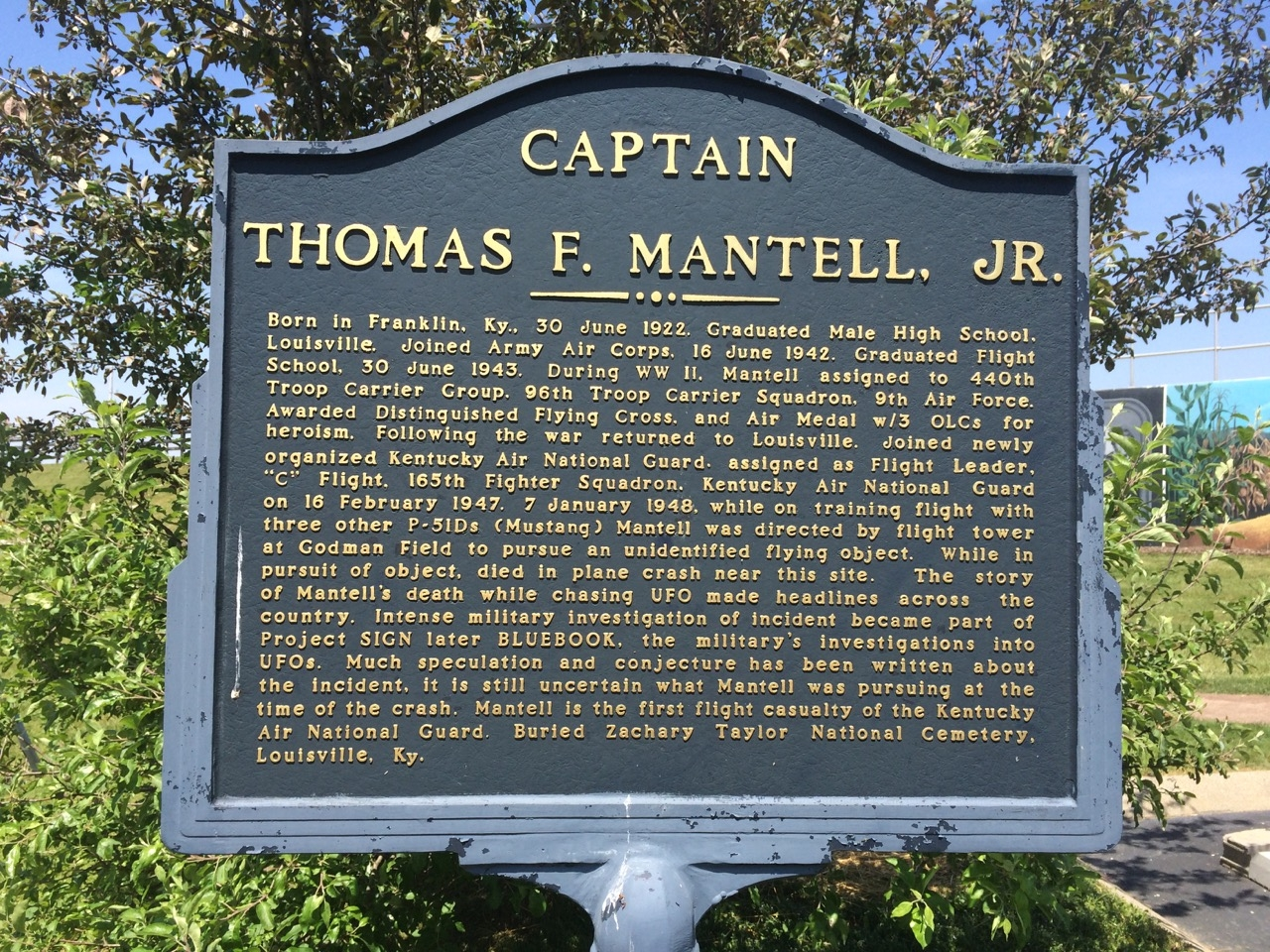
Captain Thomas F Mantell, Jr. Marker in Franklin, KY about the crash of his aircraft and death in pursuit of a UFO in 1948.

On 29 September 2001, the Simpson County Historical Society unveiled a historical marker in honor of Mantell in his hometown of Franklin. The marker is located at the exit off Interstate 65.

=== Awards ===
- Pilot Badge
- Distinguished Flying Cross
- Air Medal with three oak leaf clusters
- Distinguished Unit Citation
- American Campaign Medal
- European–African–Middle Eastern Campaign Medal with two campaign stars
- World War II Victory Medal

== See also ==
- List of reported UFO sightings
- List of unusual deaths in the 20th century
- Project Mogul
- Tomorrow is Yesterday - In a 1967 episode of Star Trek: The Original Series, a USAF pilot encounters the USS Enterprise as a UFO, which accidentally destroys his plane and takes him aboard the starship. The episode is widely seen as an homage to the Mantell incident.

== Additional reading ==
- Jerome Clark. (1998). The UFO Book: Encyclopedia of the Extraterrestrial, Visible Ink, ISBN 1-57859-029-9
- David Michael Jacobs. (1975). The UFO Controversy In America, Indiana University Press, ISBN 0-253-19006-1
- The Mantell Case Directory by National Investigations Committee on Aerial Phenomena
