= Jimmy Carter incident =

Jimmy Carter incident may refer to:

- Jimmy Carter UFO incident
- Jimmy Carter rabbit incident
