= Identification studies of UFOs =

Identifying unidentified flying objects (UFOs) is a difficult task due to the normally poor quality of the evidence provided by those who report sighting the unknown object. Observations and subsequent reporting are often made by those untrained in astronomy, atmospheric phenomena, aeronautics, physics, and perception. Nevertheless, most officially investigated UFO sightings, such as from the U.S. Air Force's Project Blue Book, have been identified as being due to honest misidentifications of natural phenomena, aircraft, or other prosaic explanations. In early U.S. Air Force attempts to explain UFO sightings, unexplained sightings routinely numbered over one in five reports. However, in early 1953, right after the CIA's Robertson Panel, percentages of unexplained sightings dropped precipitously, usually being only a few percent in any given year. When Project Blue Book closed down in 1970, only 6% of all cases were classified as being truly unidentified.

UFOs that can be explained are sometimes termed identified flying objects (IFOs).

== UFO studies ==
The following are some major studies undertaken since 1948 that reported on identification of UFOs:

- Project Sign
- Project Blue Book Special Report No. 14 (referred to further below as BBSR) was a massive statistical study the Battelle Memorial Institute did for the USAF of 3,200 UFO cases between 1952 and 1954. Of these, 22% were classified as unidentified ("true UFOs"). Another 69% were deemed identified (IFOs). There was insufficient information to make a determination in the remaining 9%.
- The official French government UFO investigation (GEPAN/SEPRA), run within the French space agency CNES between 1977 and 2004, scientifically investigated about 6000 cases and found that 13% defied any rational explanation (UFOs), while 46% were deemed readily identifiable and 41% lacked sufficient information for classification.
- The USAF-sponsored Condon Committee study reported that all 117 cases studied were or could probably be explained. A 1971 review of the results by the American Institute of Aeronautics and Astronautics concluded that 30% of the 117 cases remained unexplained.
- Of about 5,000 cases submitted to and studied by the civilian UFO organization NICAP, 16% were judged unknowns.
- The Pentagon UFO Report, is a United States federally mandated assessment summarizing information regarding unidentified flying objects (UFOs), also known as unidentified aerial phenomenon (UAPs). On June 25, 2021, a nine-page preliminary assessment was issued. It states that the UAPTF (Unidentified Aerial Phenomena Task Force) focused on 144 observations of "unidentified aerial phenomena" by the U.S Armed Forces, mostly from U.S. Navy personnel, from 2004 to 2021. No details are given in the preliminary assessment. The report found that the UAPTF was unable to identify 143 of these objects, but it included five categories of potential explanations; "Airborne Clutter" includes objects like birds and balloons, "Natural Atmospheric Phenomena" includes atmospheric effect like ice crystals, "USG or Industry Developmental Programs" includes US military technology, "Foreign Adversary Systems" includes technologies developed by foreign governments such as Russia or China, and "Other", described as a "catchall" for other explanations.
- In contrast, much more conservative numbers for the percentage of UFOs were arrived at individually by astronomer Allan Hendry, who was the chief investigator for the Center for UFO Studies (CUFOS). CUFOS was founded by astronomer J. Allen Hynek (who had been a consultant for the Air Force's Project Blue Book) to provide a serious scientific investigation into UFOs. Hendry spent 15 months personally investigating 1,307 UFO reports. In 1979, Hendry published his conclusions in The UFO Handbook: A Guide to Investigating, Evaluating, and Reporting UFO Sightings. Hendry admitted that he would like to find evidence for extraterrestrials but noted that the vast majority of cases had prosaic explanations. He found 89% of reports definitely or probably identifiable and only 9% unidentified. "Hardcore" cases—well-documented events which defied any conceivable conventional explanation—made up only 1.5% of the reports.

=== Project Sign ===
Project Sign lists that "in order to investigate the credibility of their existence the following factors must be considered in any technical analysis":

Method of support (lift)

1. Wings
2. Fuselage lift (Wingless)
3. Rotor
4. Vertical Jet
5. Magnus effect
6. Aerostatic (lighter-than-air craft)

Method of propulsion (thrust)

1. Propeller reciprocating engine combination jet
2. Rocket
3. Ramjet
4. Aerodynamic (for example, the Katzmayer effect, defined as "the reduction in drag of an airfoil when an air stream is oscillating").

=== Project Blue Book Special Report No. 14 ===
Project Blue Book Special Report No. 14 was compiled between 1951 and 1954, and included 3201 reported UFO sightings. Battelle employed four scientific analysts, who sought to divide cases into "knowns", "unknowns", and a third category of "insufficient information." They also broke down knowns and unknowns into four categories of quality, from excellent to poor. In order for a case to be deemed "identified", two analysts had to independently agree on a solution and for a case to be called "unidentified", all four analysts had to agree. A report classified as "unidentified" was defined as: "Those reports of sightings wherein the description of the object and its maneuvers could not be fitted to the pattern of any known object or phenomenon."

Out of 3,201 cases, 69% were judged to be identified, 22% were unidentified, and 9% had insufficient information to make a determination.

==== Breakdown by category of IFO and case quality ====
Category/Case Quality	All	Excellent	Good	Doubtful	Poor
Astronomical	22%	24%	23%	19%	23%
Aircraft	22%	19%	22%	25%	16%
Balloon	15%	12%	17%	17%	13%
Light phenomena	2.2%	.9%	2.4%	2.9%	1.1%
Birds	1.0%	0.9%	1.0%	1.2%	0.7%
Clouds, dust, etc.	0.4%	0%	1.0%	0.4%	0%
Psychological	2.0%	0%	0.5%	3.3%	3.3%
Other	5%	5%	5%	5%	6%
Insufficient information	9%	4%	4%	14%	21%
Unknown origin	22%	33%	25%	13%	17%

BBSR further broke these results down based on whether the identification was considered certain or merely doubtful. For example, in both the astronomical and aircraft IFO categories, 12% were considered certain and 9% were doubtful. Overall, of the 69% listed as IFOs, 42% were thought to be solved with certainty, while 27% were still considered doubtful.

In addition, if a case was lacking in adequate data, it was placed in the insufficient information category, separate from both IFOs and UFOs.

==== Military vs. civilian breakdown ====
	IFO			UFO			Insufficient Information		
	Mil	Civ	All	Mil	Civ	All	Mil	Civ	All
Best reports	65%	72%	68%	32%	24%	28%	2%	4%	3%
Worst reports	70%	70%	70%	24%	14%	16%	7%	17%	14%

The Battelle BBSR study included many internal military reports; 38% of the cases were designated as military. Military witnesses tended to submit better quality reports, had much fewer reports rated as having insufficient information, and had higher percentages of unknowns. As in the previous breakdown, the percentage of UFOs again rose with case quality for both the military and civilian subcategories.

In the summary table, best reports are those rated excellent and good; worst reports are doubtful and poor.

==== Comparison of IFOs to UFOs by characteristics ====
A key study of BBSR was to statistically compare IFOs and UFOs by six characteristics: color, number of objects, shape, duration of observations, speed, and light brightness. If there were no significant differences, the two classes were probably the same, the UFOs then representing merely a failure to properly identify prosaic phenomena that could already account for the IFOs. On the other hand, if the differences were statistically significant, this would suggest IFOs and UFOs were indeed distinctly different phenomena.

In the initial results, all characteristics except brightness tested significant at less or much less than 1% (brightness was greater than 5%). By removing "astronomical" sightings from the "knowns" and redoing the test, just two categories, number and speed, were significant at less than 1%, the remainder having results between 3% and 5%. This indicated that there was a statistically significant difference between the characteristics ascribed to UFOs and IFOs, but perhaps not as significant as the initial results suggested. For two characteristics, brightness and speed, the significance actually increased with the revised test.

=== Allan Hendry study ===
Like the Air Force, astronomer Allan Hendry found that only a small percentage of cases were hoaxes and that most sightings were actually honest misidentifications of prosaic phenomena. Hendry attributed most of these to inexperience or misperception.

Out of 1,307 cases Hendry deemed 88.6% had clear prosaic explanations (IFOs) and only 8.6% were unknowns (UFOs). Of the UFOs, Hendry reported that 7.1%, might still have a prosaic explanation while 1.5% (20 cases) had no possible plausible explanation and were completely unexplained. The remaining miscellaneous cases (2.8%) were "garbage" cases, where Hendry deemed the witnesses unreliable, the reports hopelessly contradictory, or lacking in sufficient information.

Overall, in the three major categories, 42% of all cases had astronomical explanations, 37% were aircraft, and 5% were balloons. A further breakdown allowed 77% to be readily explained by five main classes of objects: 29% were bright stars or planets, 19% were advertising planes, 15% were other aircraft, 9% were meteors and reentering space debris, and 5% were balloons of various types (mostly weather or advertising balloons but also a few prank balloons).

==== Breakdown of cases ====
Hendry also used a case classification system developed by his mentor J. Allen Hynek, who established CUFOS, where the study was carried out. In this summary table:

- NL = "Nocturnal Lights", lights seen in the sky at night.
- DD = "Daylight Discs", objects seen in daytime (but not necessarily disc in shape).
- RV = "Radar/Visual" cases, objects observed by both witnesses and radar.
- CE = "Close Encounter" cases. For convenience, CE cases listed below are combined totals of Hynek's CE1, CE2, and CE3 cases, where:
  - CE1 cases where objects were thought to be seen up close (within 500 feet).
  - CE2 had purported physical interactions with the environment (physical trace cases or electromagnetic interference).
  - CE3 cases were supposed to involve sightings of occupants.

Category	NL	DD	CE	RV	Total Cases	Percent
Astronomical						
bright stars or planets	360	2	16	2	380	29%
meteors, re-entering man-made spacecraft	113	5	4	0	122	9%
artificial satellites	24	0	0	0	24	2%
moon	22	0	0	0	22	2%
TOTAL (all cases)	519	7	22	2	550	42%
Aircraft						
advertising planes	230	0	22	0	252	19%
other aircraft	196	22	6	0	224	17%
missile launches	9	0	1	0	10	0.7%
TOTAL	435	22	29	0	486	37%
balloons	23	35	2	3	63	5%
birds	5	1	0	0	6	0.5%
clouds, dust	10	2	0	0	12	0.9%
light phenomena (mirage, moon dog, ground lights, searchlights, etc.)	9	1	4	0	14	1.1%
other (kites, flares, reflections, windblown debris, etc.)	12	3	1	0	16	1.2%
Total Identified						
Cases	1024	71	58	5	1158	88.6%
Percent	78.3%	5.4%	4.4%	.4%	88.6%	
Total Unidentified						
Cases	79	18	16	0	113	8.6%
Percent	6%	1.4%	1.2%	0%	8.6%	
MISC (insufficient information, inconsistent accounts, unreliable witnesses)					36	2.8%
Total all cases						
Cases	1103	89	74	5	1307	100%
Percent	84.4%	6.8%	5.7%	0.4%	100%	

== Common causes of misidentification and UFOs ==
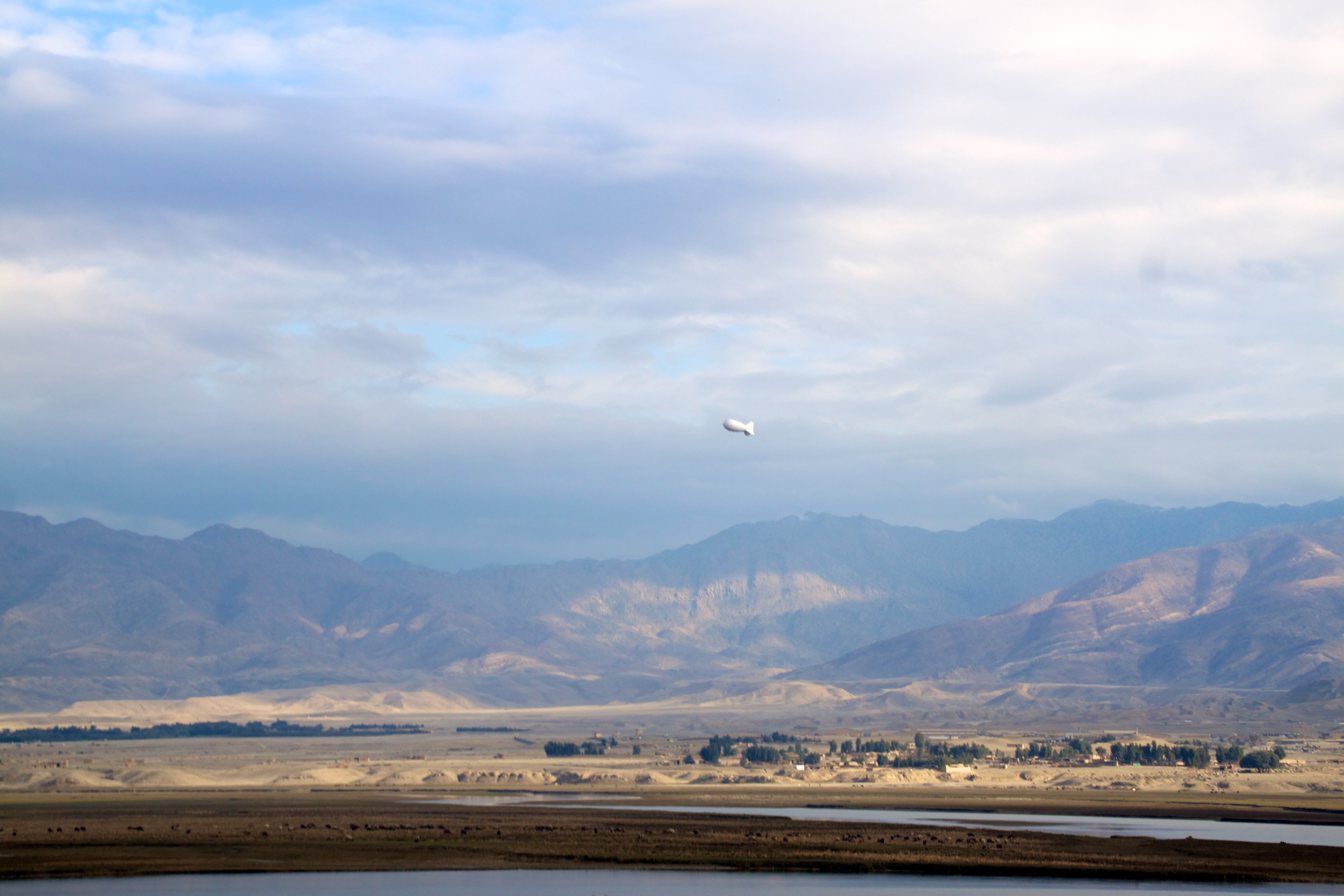
Unmanned airship

Both BBSR and Hendry found that three classes of objects or phenomena—astronomical, aircraft, or balloons—accounted for a large majority of identifiable UFO reports (referred to as IFOs), 86% and 83% in the two studies. For example, in Hendry's study, bright stars and planets made up 29% of all cases while meteors (and to a much lesser extent, re-entering space debris) made up 9%. Hovering aircraft such as helicopters or blimps, or aircraft that appear to be hovering, such as airplanes seen at night from the front with their headlights on as they approach for landing can often confuse witnesses, as can aircraft strobe lights. BBSR reported a much higher percentage of balloons than Hendry.

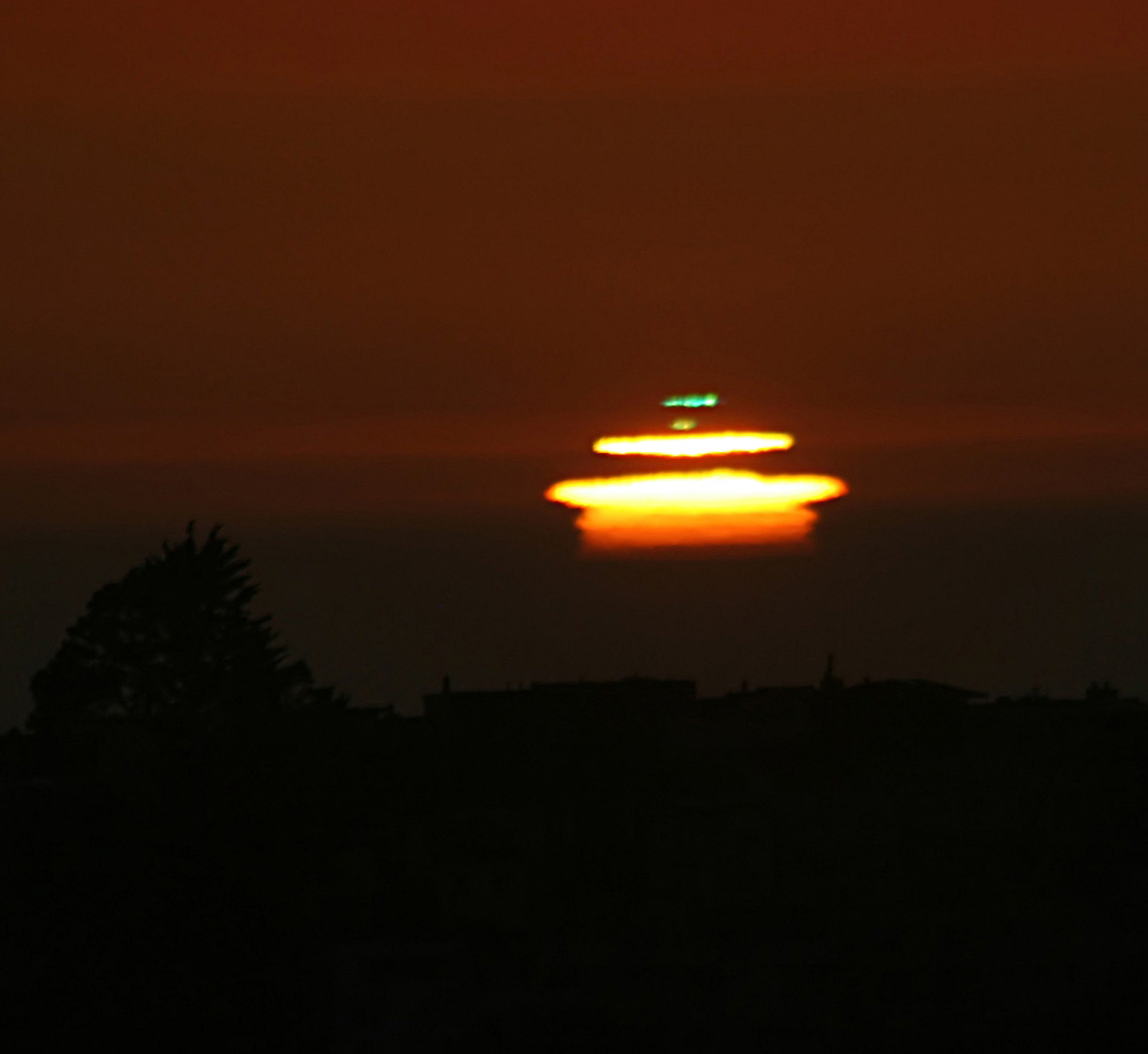
Green flash at sunset

Claims of misidentification are after-the-fact analyses, not direct observations, and are often misconstrued by skeptics and UFO advocates alike: They do not suggest that the experiences did not exist, but merely that they can be explained by prosaic causes. For instance, retrospective analyses of the Jimmy Carter UFO incident of 1969 connect the sighting with the known position of the planet Venus for that time, date, and location. Gordon Cooper, a strong advocate of the extraterrestrial hypothesis (ETH), claimed to have been fooled by the planet Venus when he was a fighter pilot, thinking it a distant enemy plane, and the 1967 "flying cross" of Devon, England and the 1966 Portage County UFO Chase case have both been associated with astronomical sources.

In 2009, Peter Davenport, Director of the National UFO Reporting Center, posted this complaint online:

We are receiving hundreds of reports every month of normal, terrestrial events, e.g. over-flights of the International Space Station, the Space Shuttle, or satellites; "flares" of light from "Iridium" satellites; the appearance of typical meteors; and observations of normal, "twinkling" stars, planets, contrails, clusters of balloons, etc. In fact, the overwhelming majority of reports that we receive now are of these normal objects and events, and processing the reports is taking a huge amount of our time... I believe the majority of time I spend on the Hotline is devoted to trying to convince people who have been staring for hours at a star or planet that the object of interest is not a UFO.

There are several natural and man-made objects that are commonly suggested as explanations for UFO sightings:

=== Venus ===
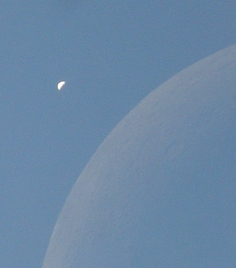
Crescent phase of Venus

With the exception of the Sun, Moon and the International Space Station (1998-), Venus is the brightest object in the sky and is often visible in the early morning and evening sky. Even experienced witnesses, especially when they are in unfamiliar surroundings or unusual atmospheric conditions, can fail to identify Venus correctly; however, the location of Venus is easily calculable, and professional astronomers have said that many of the UFO reports received from concerned citizens are due to observations of Venus. Astronomer Phil Plait, in particular, has suggested that Venus is responsible for the majority of all UFO reports.

=== Meteors ===
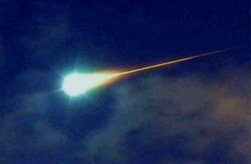
Bolide

The brightest meteors known as bolides are long-lasting fireballs that leave a trail in the sky which can be visible for up to an hour after passing. Such events are relatively rare but can be witnessed by a large area of the Earth since most events occur kilometers up in the atmosphere. Those witnessing such events who are not familiar with meteors can be easily fooled into thinking that the meteor is a UFO. Because meteors are not predictable with the same degree of accuracy as planets, stars, or man-made objects such as satellites, these occurrences are more difficult to prove in retrospect, though UFO sightings during meteor showers, or where there are astronomical reports of bolides, are likely to be explained as such.

=== Balloons, aircraft, satellites and other man-made objects ===
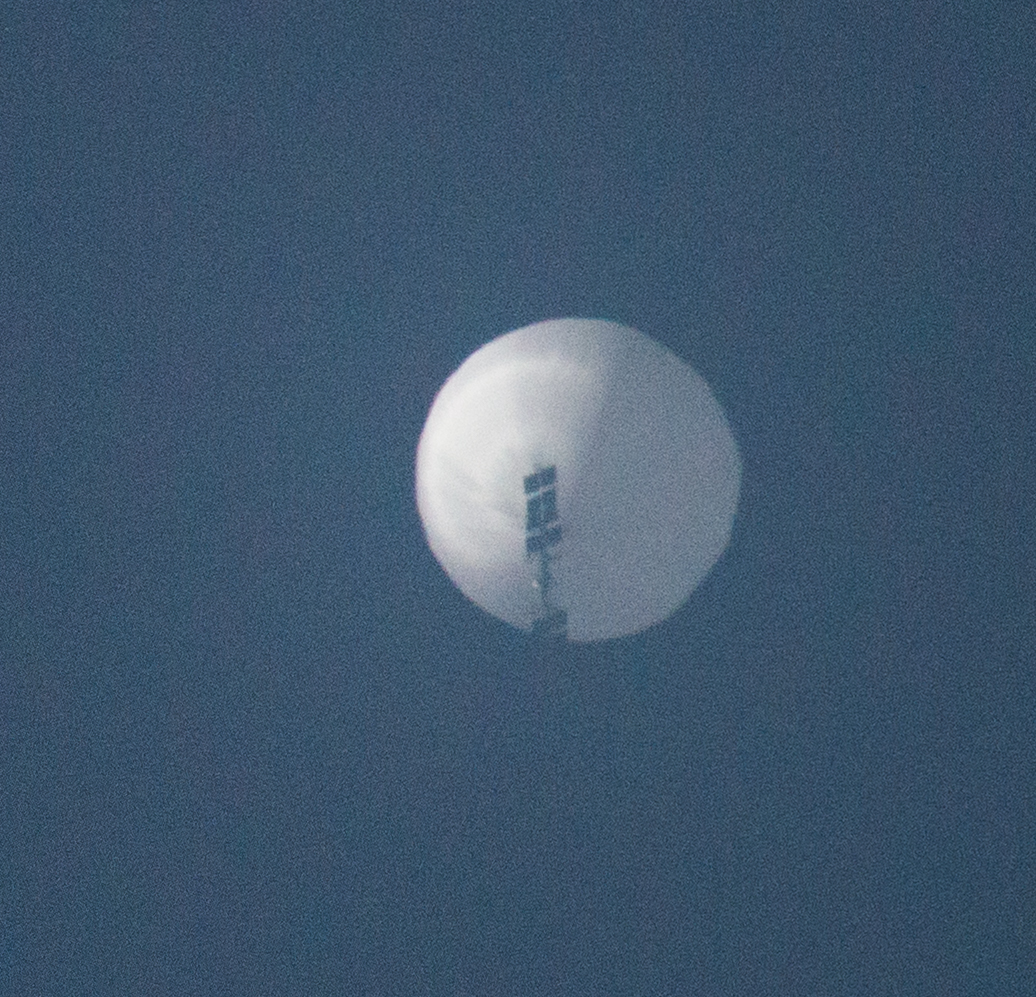
High-altitude balloon

Many reports capture conventional, man-made objects. A Skyhook balloon has been postulated as an explanation for the Mantell UFO Incident, which led to the death of Captain Thomas Mantell.

Project Loon (2018-2021) was a secret effort by Google to bring internet services to isolated areas. Test balloons of different shapes were used and reported as UFOs. The Google Project Manager stated in an article in Wired Magazine that the team used UFO reports to track the balloon's progress for one of the launches.

With the continuing development of stealth technologies, aircraft shapes have radically changed. These new test designs appear unusual and cause reports. In 1992 the CIA released a report indicating that many UFO reports in the 1950s were classified aircraft like the SR-71 and U-2.

The increase in civilian drone usage and popularity throughout the 2010s may be moving identification of objects away from UFOs and towards drones.

=== Lenticular clouds ===
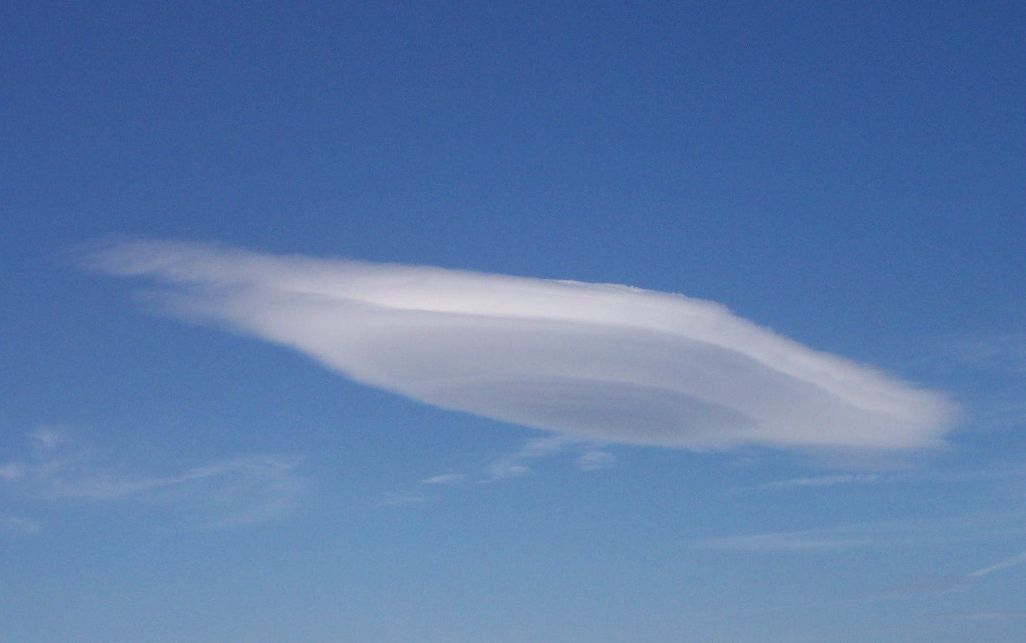
Lenticular clouds have been reported as UFOs due to their peculiar shape.

These stationary cloud formations often appear above mountains, but can happen when winds and "eddies" help shape clouds into lens shaped clouds and people see these as "flying saucers".

=== Misperception ===
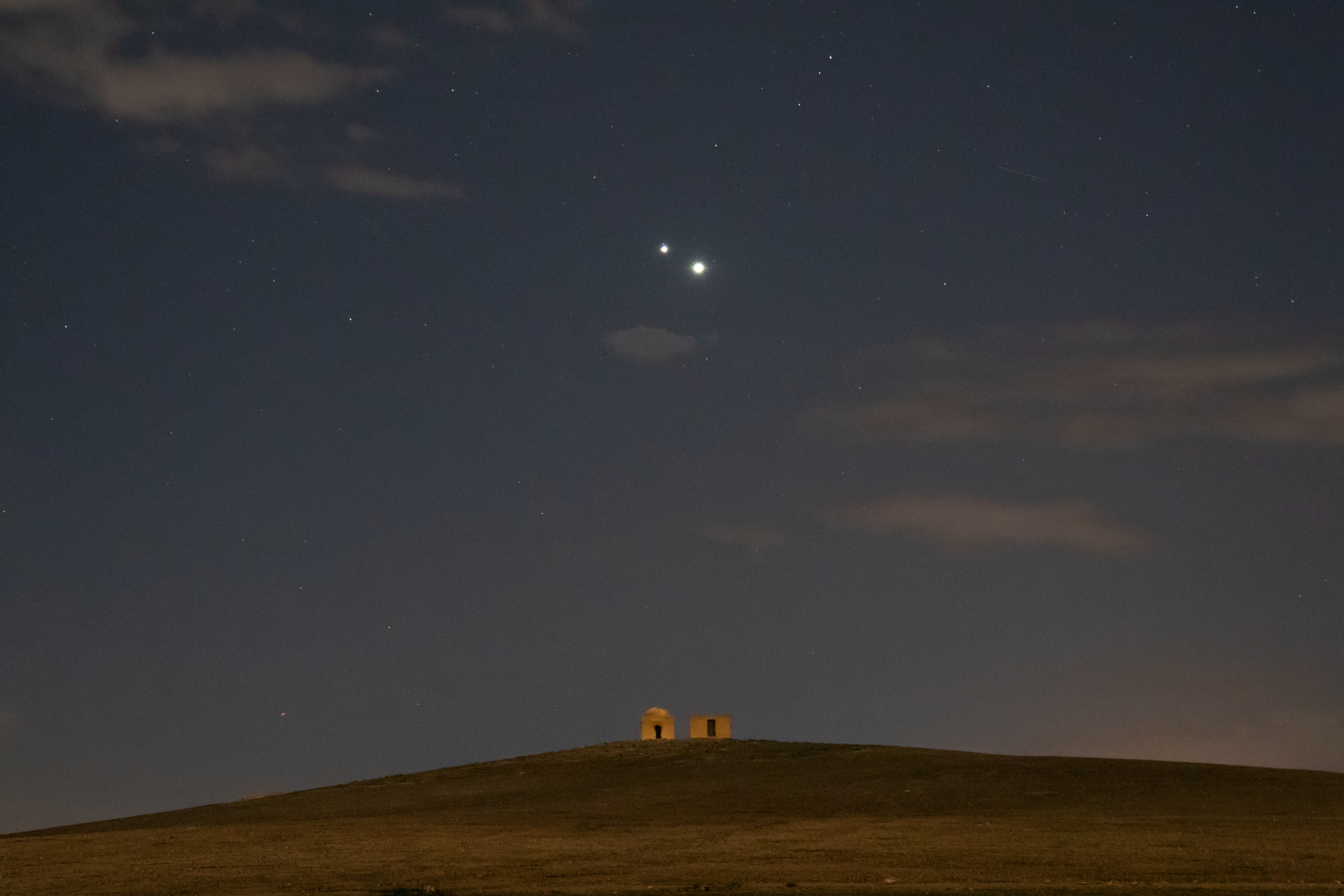
Classical planets in the night sky

Light distortion from air turbulence can cause celestial bodies to move to a limited degree as can a visual perceptual effect called the autokinetic effect, caused by small, involuntary eye movements after staring at a star-like light against a black background without a frame of reference. To some observers, these may cause stars and planets to appear to start and stop, change direction, or dart around. Hendry and other UFO skeptics attribute complex patterns of apparent motion in UFO reports to the autokinetic effect. Its opposite, autostasis is one of the causes as well.

Another type of misperceived motion sometimes occurs when people are driving in a vehicle. Witnesses may believe the "UFO" was following them even though the celestial body was actually stationary. Even police and other normally reliable witnesses can occasionally be fooled by sightings of bright stars and planets.

In about 10% of Hendry's cases caused by celestial bodies, witnesses greatly underestimated distances to the objects, giving distance estimates ranging from 200 feet to 125 miles (60 m to 200 km).

According to Hendry, moving clouds may also sometimes confuse observers by creating induced motion. Hendry believes this occasionally makes observers also believe objects have suddenly disappeared or make a rapid departure.

==== Fata Morgana ====
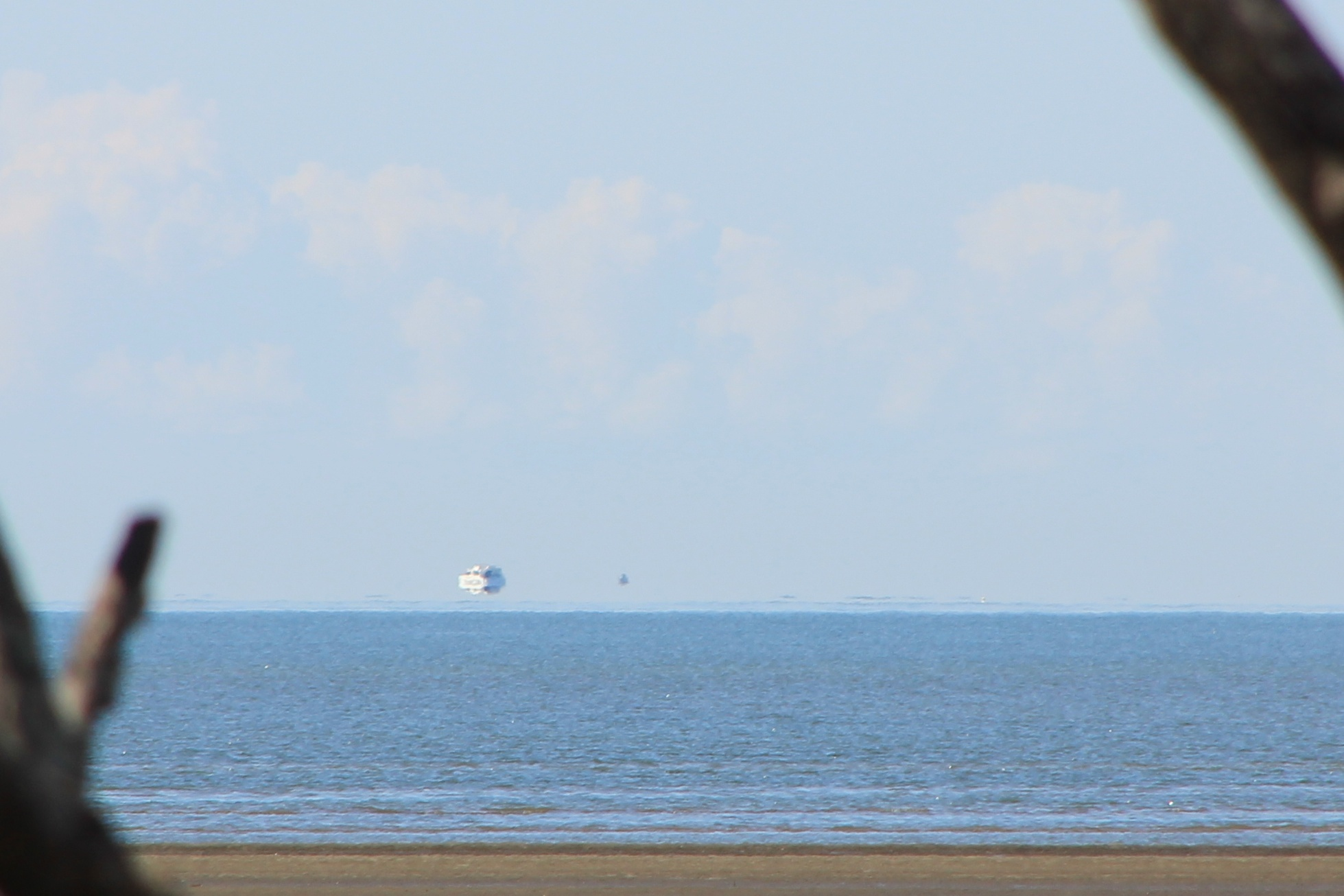
A Fata Morgana of a boat below the horizon produces the illusion of a solid form floating in the sky.

Fata Morgana is a type of mirage responsible for some UFO sightings, by making objects located below the astronomical horizon appear to be hovering in the sky. It also magnifies images and makes them look unrecognizable.

The UFOs seen on radar can also be due to Fata Morgana, since water vapor in the air can create radar mirages more readily than temperature inversions can create optical mirages. According to GEPAN/SEPRA, the official UFO investigation in France,

As is well known, atmospheric ducting is the explanation for certain optical mirages, and in particular the arctic illusion called "fata morgana" where distant ocean or surface ice, which is essentially flat, appears to the viewer in the form of vertical columns and spires, or "castles in the air."
People often assume that mirages occur only rarely. This may be true of optical mirages, but conditions for radar mirages are more common, due to the role played by water vapor which strongly affects the atmospheric refractivity in relation to radio waves. Since clouds are closely associated with high levels of water vapor, optical mirages due to water vapor are often rendered undetectable by the accompanying opaque cloud. On the other hand, radar propagation is essentially unaffected by the water droplets of the cloud so that changes in water vapor content with altitude are very effective in producing atmospheric ducting and radar mirages.

Fata Morgana was named as a hypothesis for the mysterious Australian phenomenon Min Min light.

=== Other misidentifications ===
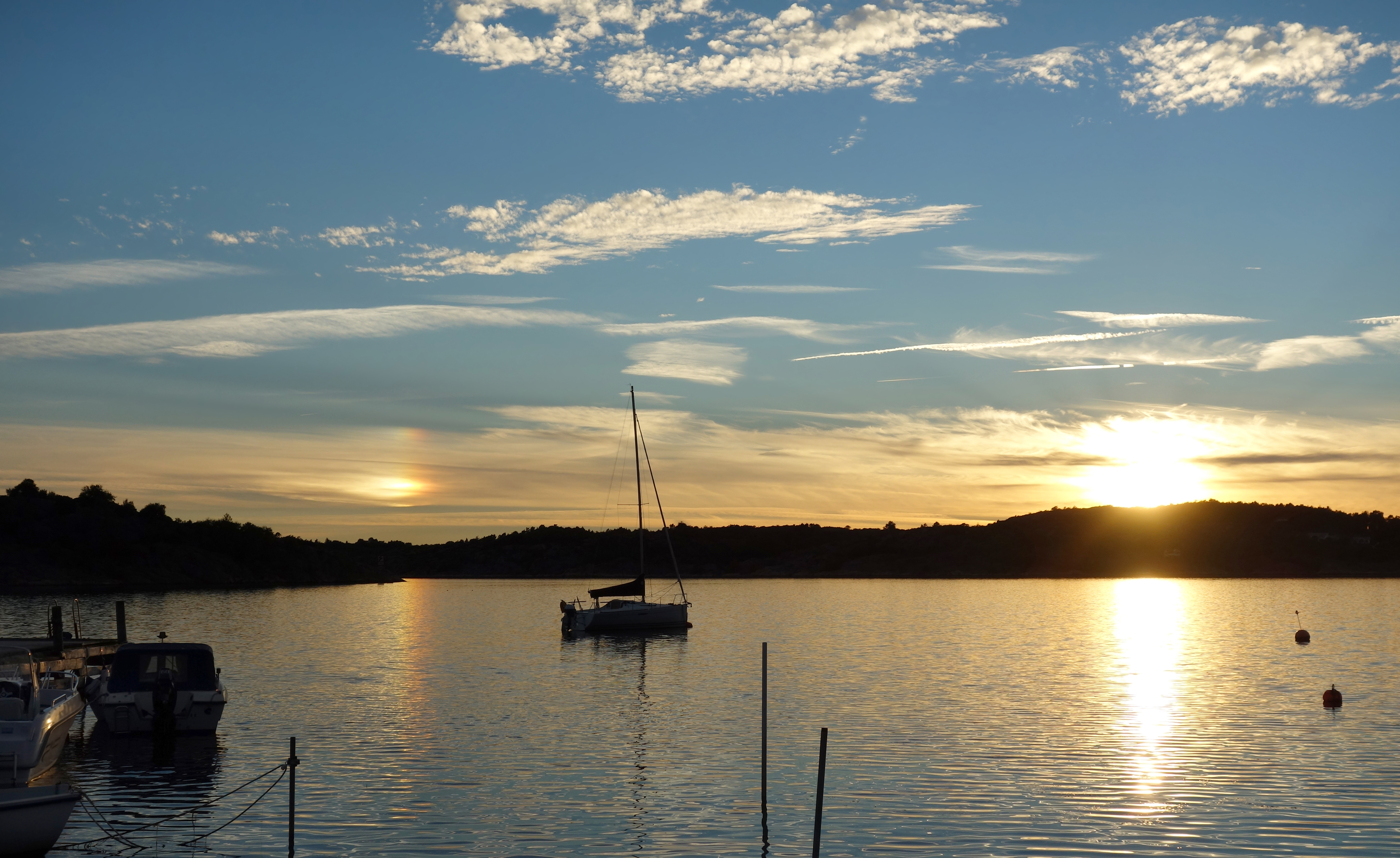
A sun dog to the left of the Sun

The BBSR and Hendry studies identified as rare causes for UFO reports based on misidentification, such objects and phenomena as birds, light phenomena (including mirages, moondogs, sundogs, auroras, ground lights such as street lights, and searchlights reflected off of clouds), and atmospheric phenomena such as clouds, dust and fog (including unusual cloud formations such as lenticular clouds, noctilucent clouds, rainbow effects, and high-altitude ice crystals). Other identified causes included kites, flares, reflections off windows, and windborne debris.

==== Upper atmospheric lightning ====
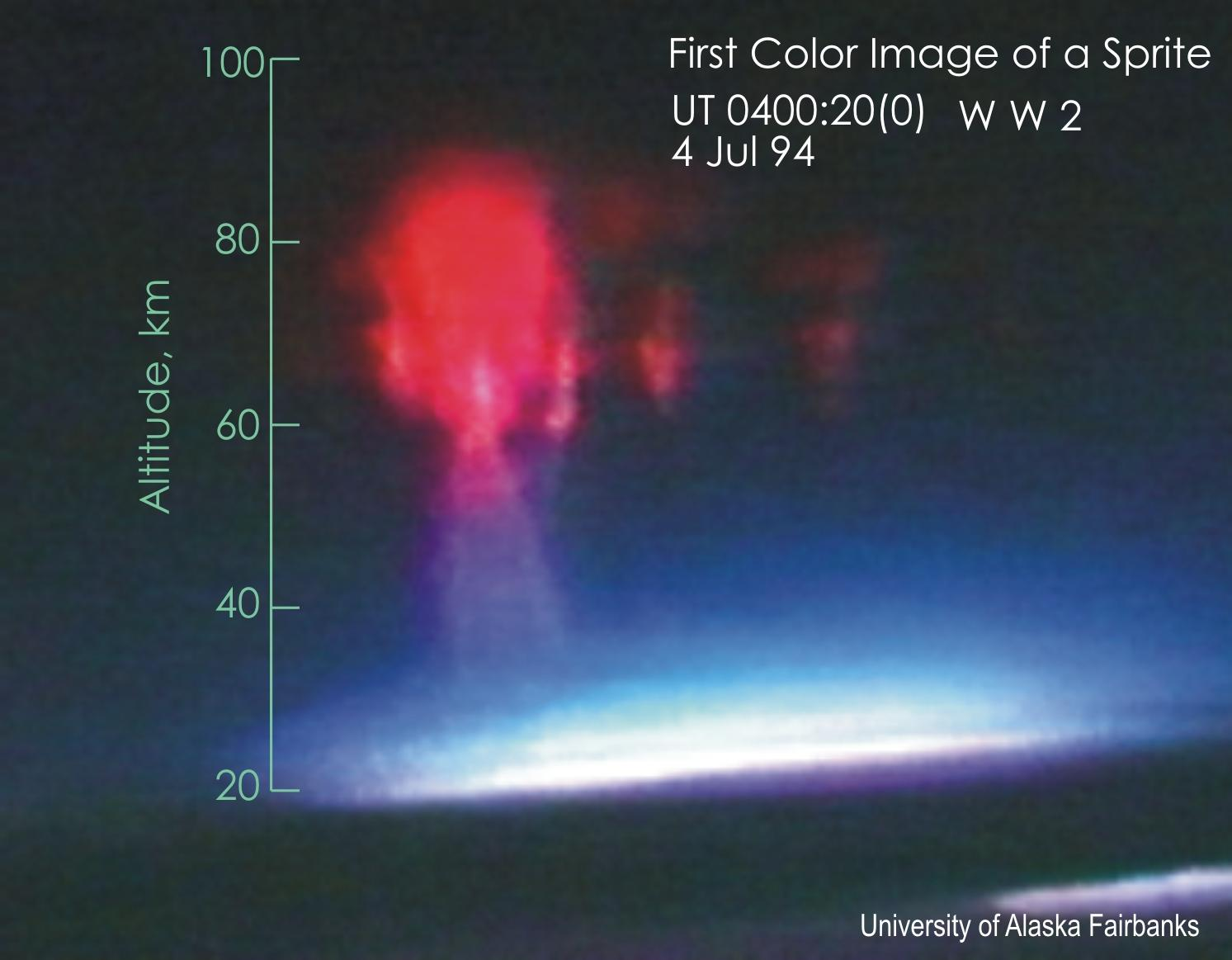
A sprite.

A 2009 report on Tel Aviv University geophysicist Colin Price's work said that occurrences of upper-atmospheric lightning such as sprites, elves might explain some reports of UFO sightings.

==== Electronic warfare ====
Jeff Wise wrote in New York's Digital Intelligencer that some military UAP reports could reflect electronic warfare effects rather than extraordinary craft, noting that radar-deception techniques such as Doppler spoofing can make aircraft appear to be at false distances or velocities. Wise wrote that the military's public discussion of UAP could help reduce reporting stigma and encourage aviators to provide data on anomalous encounters; Navy spokesman Joseph Gradisher said that greater reporting would help analysts "look at this objectively" because "The more data you have, the better you are to analyze it and turn that data into information into knowledge."

A 2018 U.S. Navy patent application described using laser-induced plasma filaments as countermeasures against infrared-guided missiles, including rastering the plasma into volumetric "ghost" images in space to decoy incoming threats. In 2020, David Hambling wrote in Forbes that such technology might also help explain some recent military UFO reports.

==== Psychological ====
Historian Greg Eghigian in Smithsonian argued that, as flight technologies change, the descriptions of unidentified flying objects also change, and that observers interpret such reports through the lens of current conflicts, events and worries. According to sociologist David L. Miller, Neil J. Smelser and Orrin E. Klapp treated UFO phenomena, especially widespread sightings by many witnesses, as manifestations of mass hysteria and social contagion.

== See also ==
- Cryptoterrestrial hypothesis – Suggestion of an alien civilization on Earth
- Extraterrestrial hypothesis – Hypothesis that some unidentified flying objects are created by extraterrestrial life
- Fringe science – Inquiries far outside of mainstream science
- Interdimensional hypothesis – Idea advanced by Ufologists
- Investigation of UFO reports by the United States government
- List of reported UFO sightings
- List of topics characterized as pseudoscience
- List of ufologists
- Project Galileo – Educational astronomy project
- Time-traveler hypothesis – Concept developed by Ufologists
- UFOs in fiction
