= Allan Hendry =

American astronomer

- Born: 1950 (age 75–76)
- Education: University of Michigan B.A
- Known for: The UFO Handbook
- Scientific career
- Fields: Astronomy

Allan Hendry (born 1950) is an American astronomer and ufologist. UFO historian Jerome Clark calls him "one of the most skilled investigators in the history of UFO research." He was the main investigator for the Center for UFO Studies (CUFOS) in the 1970s.

== Education and career ==
Hendry earned a B.A. in astronomy from the University of Michigan in 1972.

== UFO research ==
Hendry was hired for CUFOS by the organization's founder, J. Allen Hynek, who was seeking a full-time investigator with scientific expertise and an open-minded attitude, and who was neither a debunker nor a "UFO believer".

As the chief investigator for CUFOS during most of the 1970s, Hendry personally investigated over 1000 UFO reports. He was able to find mundane explanations for the vast majority of UFO cases, but he also judged a small percentage of cases to be unexplained. One of the most famous "unexplained" cases he investigated was the Val Johnson Incident in 1979, in which a deputy sheriff in Minnesota experienced a "collision" with an unknown object which damaged his patrol car and left him temporarily unconscious. Hendry was the primary ufologist to investigate the case; in 1980 he debated the incident with well-known UFO debunker Philip Klass at a symposium held at the Smithsonian Institution.

He was reluctant to speculate as to origins of the unexplained cases, and argued they might be explainable with further data, leading some researchers to label Hendry a "closet skeptic". At the same time, a few noted skeptics and debunkers who had praised Hendry's scientific rigor subjected him to strong criticism for his conclusion that a handful of well-documented UFO reports seemed to defy analysis, and might represent genuine anomalies. Hendry suggested that the criticism from both camps were little more than ad hominem attacks, since they typically paid little or no attention to the substance of his research.

== The UFO Handbook ==
Hendry's magnum opus was The UFO Handbook, a guide for other UFO investigators. In the book, Hendry castigates many mainstream scientists for what he sees as their neglecting UFO studies, but he also had strong criticism for many amateur UFO investigators, who he thought did the subject more harm than good. Clark characterized Hendry's appraisal of ufology in general as "deeply pessimistic", concluding that the subject was all but paralyzed by infighting, a lack of cooperation and standardization, and dubious claims. The UFO Handbook even earned the praise of arch-skeptic Philip J. Klass, who in a review published in the Skeptical Inquirer described the book as "one of the most significant and useful books on the subject ever published." In an undated PBS interview (sometime after 1994, based on publication dates of a few cited books), Klass again recommends Hendry's book, calling it "Once [sic] of the best."

In a 1978 presentation at Walsh College, Hendry said "Maybe I'm the most skeptical of the people at the center. I'm in this thing to get an answer to the UFO question, whatever it is. If it's sociological, fine. If it's extra-terrestial [sic], fine. But I know there's no blanket explanation at this time. I've never seen a UFO and that's probably a good thing, because people might question my motives if I were personally involved." His presentation also included information on identifying flying objects.

In the early 1980s, CUFOS experienced some financial difficulties, and as a result the organization could no longer afford a full-time researcher. In addition, Hendry had come to the conclusion that the methodologies used to study UFOs were ultimately frustrating, inconclusive, and futile. As a result, Hendry left CUFOS and has largely avoided further involvement in UFO studies.

== See also ==
- Identified flying object
