= Killer rabbit =

Killer rabbit may refer to:

- Rabbit of Caerbannog, a fictional beast from the film Monty Python and the Holy Grail
- Jimmy Carter rabbit incident, a 1979 incident involving a swamp rabbit trying to board President Jimmy Carter's fishing boat
- The creatures from the 1972 horror film Night of the Lepus
