= Foo fighter =

UFOs reported in the 1940s

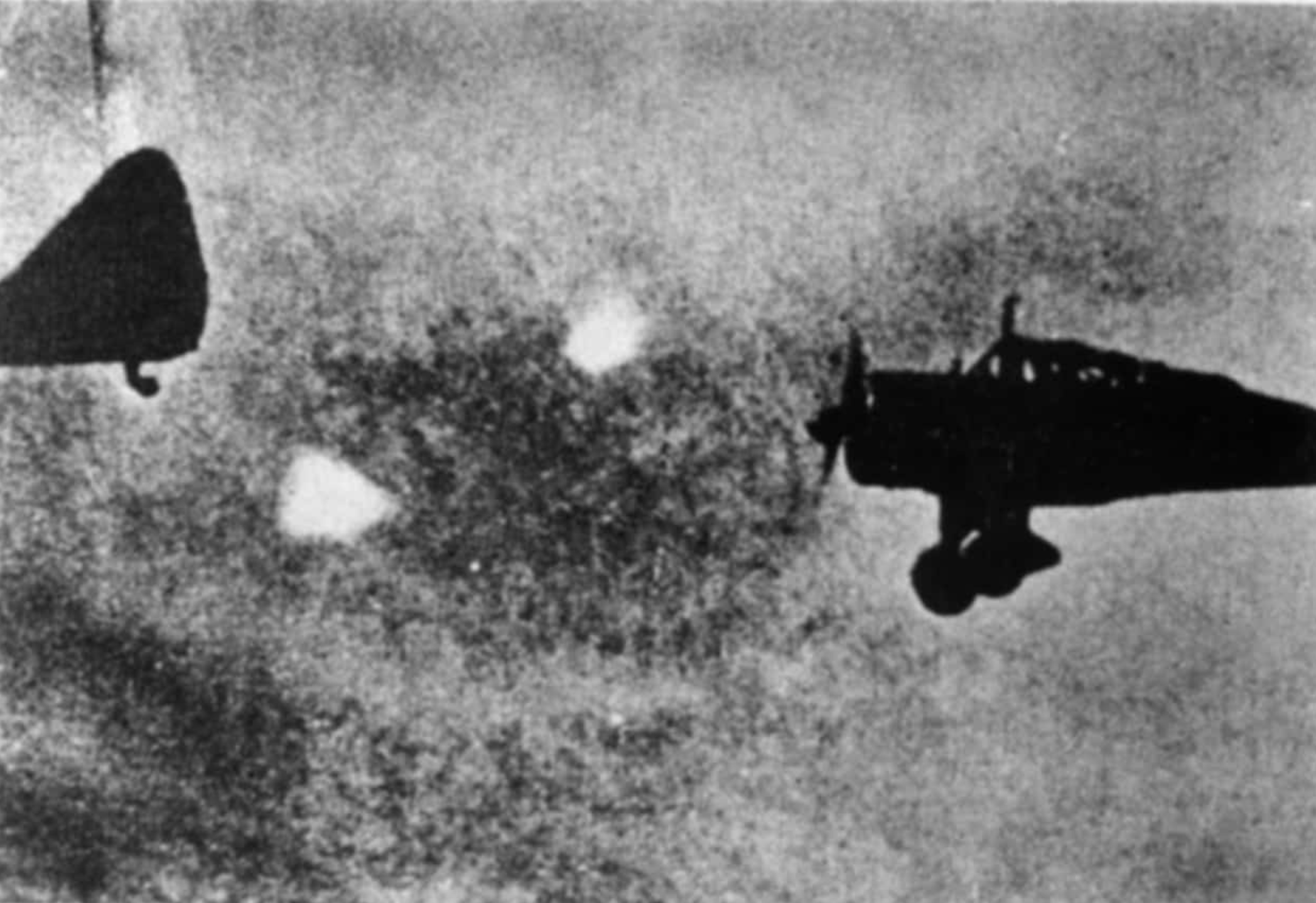
Foo Fighter during WWII over Germany

The term foo fighters was used by Allied aircraft pilots during World War II to describe various unidentified flying objects (UFO) or mysterious aerial phenomena seen in the skies over both the European and Pacific theaters of operations.

Though foo fighters initially described a type of UFO reported and named by the U.S. 415th Night Fighter Squadron, the term was also commonly used to mean any UFO sighting from that period. Formally reported from November 1944 onwards, foo fighters were presumed by witnesses to be secret weapons employed by the enemy.

The Robertson Panel explored possible explanations, for instance that they were electrostatic phenomena similar to St. Elmo's fire, electromagnetic phenomena, or simply reflections of light from ice crystals.

== Etymology ==
The nonsense word "foo" emerged in popular culture during the early 1930s, first being used by cartoonist Bill Holman, who peppered his Smokey Stover fireman cartoon strips with "foo" signs and puns.

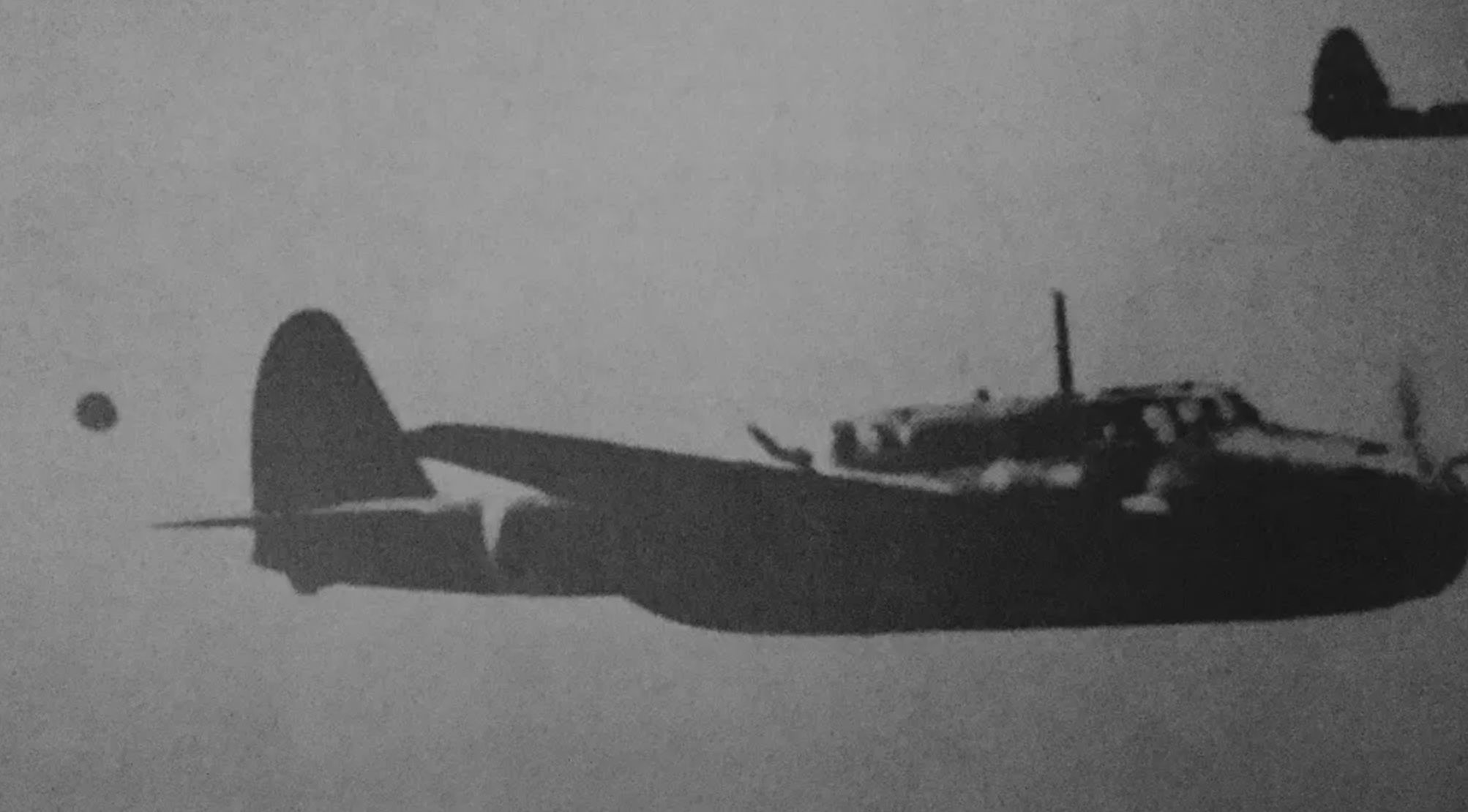
Foo fighters were made famous by the reports from the 415th Night Fighter Squadron that was under the 64th Fighter Wing.

The term "foo" was borrowed from Smokey Stover by a radar operator in the 415th Night Fighter Squadron, Donald J. Meiers, who, according to most 415th members, gave the foo fighters their name. Meiers was from Chicago and was an avid reader of Holman's strip, which was run daily in the Chicago Tribune. Smokey Stover's catch-phrase was "where there's foo, there's fire". In a mission debriefing on the evening of November 27, 1944, Frederic "Fritz" Ringwald, the unit's S-2 Intelligence Officer, stated that Meiers and Pilot Lt. Ed Schleuter had sighted a red ball of fire that appeared to chase them through a variety of high-speed maneuvers. Ringwald said that Meiers was extremely agitated and had a copy of the comic strip tucked in his back pocket. He pulled it out and slammed it down on Ringwald's desk and said, "[I]t was another one of those fuckin' foo fighters!" and stormed out of the debriefing room.

According to Ringwald, because of the lack of a better name, it stuck. And this was originally what the men of the 415th started calling these incidents: "fuckin' foo fighters". In December 1944, a press correspondent from the Associated Press in Paris, Bob Wilson, was sent to the 415th at their base outside of Dijon, France, to investigate this story. It was at this time that the term was cleaned up to just "foo fighters". The squadron commander, Capt. Harold Augsperger, also decided to sanitize the term to "foo fighters" in the historical data of the squadron.

Other proposed origins of the term have been a corruption of the French feu for fire, and a corruption of the military acronym FUBAR (fucked up beyond all recognition).

== History ==
Royal Air Force personnel had reported seeing lights following their aircraft from as early as March 1942, with similar sightings involving RAF bomber crews over the Balkans starting in April 1944. American sightings were first recorded by crews from the 422nd Night-Fighter Squadron stationed in Occupied Belgium during the first week of October 1944. At the time, these were erroneously believed to be Messerschmitt Me 163 rocket-powered interceptors, which did not operate at night. However, the bulk of the sightings started occurring in the last week of November 1944, when pilots flying over Western Europe by night reported seeing fast-moving round glowing objects following their aircraft. The objects were variously described as fiery, and glowing red, white, or orange. Some pilots described them as resembling Christmas-tree lights and reported that they seemed to toy with the aircraft, making wild turns before simply vanishing. Pilots and aircrew reported that the objects flew together in formation with their aircraft and behaved as if they were under intelligent control, but never displayed hostile behavior. However, they could not be outmaneuvered or shot down. The phenomenon was so widespread that the lights earned a name –in the European Theater they were often called "Kraut fireballs", but for the most part called "foo fighters". The military took the sightings seriously, suspecting that the mysterious sightings might be secret German weapons, but further investigation revealed that German and Japanese pilots had reported similar sightings.

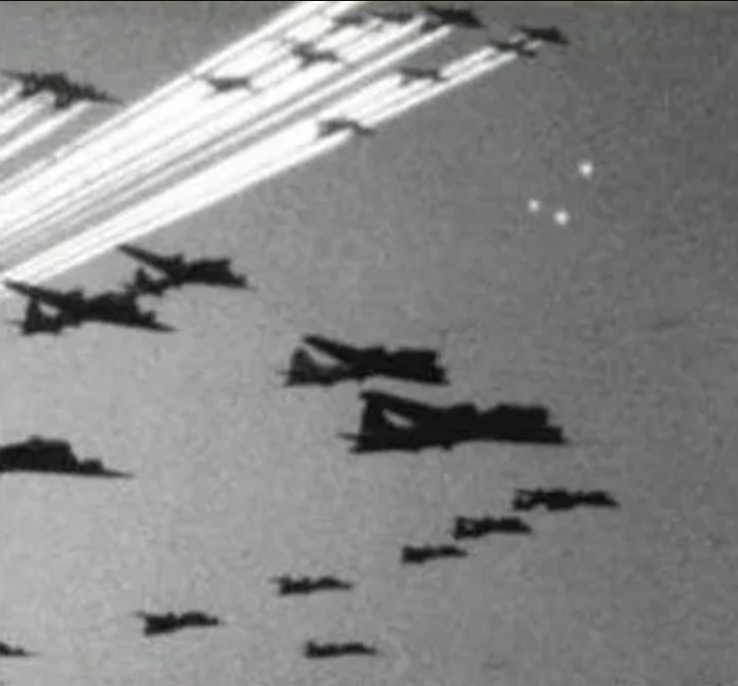
Possible foo fighters during WWII in Europe.

On 13 December 1944, the Supreme Headquarters Allied Expeditionary Force in Paris issued a press release, which was printed in The New York Times the next day, officially describing the phenomenon as a "new German weapon". Follow-up stories, using the term "foo fighters", appeared in the New York Herald Tribune and the British Daily Telegraph.

In its 15 January 1945 edition, Time magazine carried a story titled "Foo-Fighter", in which it reported that the "balls of fire" had been following USAAF night fighters for over a month, and that the pilots had named it the "foo-fighter". According to Time, descriptions of the phenomena varied, but the pilots agreed that the mysterious lights followed their aircraft closely at high speed.

The "balls of fire" phenomenon reported from the Pacific Theater of Operations differed somewhat from the foo fighters reported from Europe; the "ball of fire" resembled a large burning sphere that "just hung in the sky", though it was reported to sometimes follow aircraft. There was speculation that the phenomena could be related to the Japanese fire balloon campaign. As in Europe, no aircraft were reported as having been attacked by a "ball of fire".

The postwar Robertson Panel cited foo fighter reports, noting that their behavior did not appear to be threatening, and mentioned possible explanations, for instance that they were electrostatic phenomena similar to St. Elmo's fire, electromagnetic phenomena, or simply reflections of light from ice crystals. The Panel's report suggested that "If the term 'flying saucers' had been popular in 1943–1945, these objects would have been so labeled."

=== Sightings ===
Foo fighters were reported on many occasions from around the world. Examples include:

- In September 1941 two sailors on the S.S. Pułaski, a Polish merchant vessel transporting British troops over the Indian Ocean, reported a "strange globe glowing with greenish light, about half the size of the full moon as it appears to us." They alerted a British officer, who watched the movements of the object with them for over an hour.
- Pilot Officer Bryan Lumsden, a New Zealander flying with No.3 Squadron's Night Flight, encountered two amber or orange-colored lights that followed him on an intruder mission over northern France in December 1942. One light was higher than the other, which appeared to rule out wing-tip navigation lights from an aircraft. The lights pursued him until he reached the English Channel. Another pilot from his unit experienced a similar phenomenon the following evening, with a green light. The story was eventually published in the Christchurch Star-Sun newspaper's 4 November 1955 edition.
- 13 October 1944: An RAF crew from No.178 Squadron based in Italy reported seeing lights following their aircraft over Hungary during a night raid on Székesfehérvár. A B-24 Liberator KH103 flown by Pilot Officer Taylor was followed by an intermittent red light for several minutes. The squadron had started reporting numerous similar instances as early as April 1944 and would continue doing so throughout the remainder of 1944 and into 1945.
- Charles R. Bastien of the US Eighth Air Force reported one of the first encounters with foo fighters over the Belgium/Netherlands area; he described them as "two fog lights flying at high rates of speed that could change direction rapidly". During debriefing, his intelligence officer told him that two RAF nightfighters had reported the same thing, and it was later reported in British newspapers.
- Career U.S. Air Force pilot Duane Adams often related that he had witnessed two occurrences of a bright light which paced his aircraft for about half an hour and then rapidly ascended into the sky. Both incidents occurred at night, both over the South Pacific, and both were witnessed by the entire aircraft crew. The first sighting occurred shortly after the end of World War II while Adams piloted a B-25 bomber. The second sighting occurred in the early 1960s when Adams was piloting a KC-135 tanker.
- Senator Ted Stevens described an encounter from the time he was a US Air Force fighter pilot during World War II, as recounted by Senator Harry Reid: "I was flying and there was an object next to me. I couldn’t get rid of it, I slowed up, it was there. I sped up, it was there. I would dive, it would be there. I called. Nothing on radar."

== Explanations and theories ==
The 415th Night-Fighter Squadron's Intelligence Officer, Captain Ringwald, sent a report listing 14 separate incidents in December 1944 and early January 1945 to the intelligence section at XII Tactical Air Command, the unit's immediate superiors at 64th Fighter Wing being unable to offer any answers. Without answers of their own, XII TAC requested assistance from the topmost echelon: Supreme Headquarters Allied Expeditionary Force (SHAEF), in Paris. SHAEF had no knowledge of the phenomenon and asked if the British Air Ministry in London had any information. The Air Ministry's explanation for the foo fighter phenomenon was received on 13 March 1945:

Bomber Command crews have for some time been reporting similar phenomena. A few of the alleged aircraft may have been Me 262 and for the rest, flak rockets are suggested as the most likely explanation. The whole affair is still something of a mystery and the evidence is very sketchy and varied so that no definite and satisfactory explanation can yet be given.

— Air Ministry DDI2 to A/C of S, A-2, SHAEF, 13 March 1945

A group of scientists, engineers and former high-ranking Luftwaffe officers were questioned about wartime "Balls of Fire" reports by staff from United States Air Force in Europe's intelligence section in the early autumn of 1945. None of the thirteen interviewed claimed any knowledge of a German secret weapons program that could have explained the sightings.

Any type of electrical discharge from the wings of airplanes (see St. Elmo's Fire) has been suggested as an explanation, since it has been known to appear at the wingtips of aircraft. It has also been pointed out that some of the descriptions of foo fighters closely resemble those of ball lightning.

During April 1945, the U.S. Navy began to experiment on visual illusions as experienced by nighttime aviators. This work began the U.S. Navy's Bureau of Medicine (BUMED) project X-148-AV-4-3. This project pioneered the study of aviators' vertigo and was initiated because a wide variety of anomalous events were being reported by nighttime aviators. Edgar Vinacke, who was the prime flight psychologist on this project, summarized the need for a cohesive and systemic outline of the epidemiology of aviators' vertigo:

Pilots do not have sufficient information about phenomena of disorientation, and, as a corollary, are given considerable disorganized, incomplete, and inaccurate information. They are largely dependent upon their own experience, which must supplement and interpret the traditions about "Vertigo" which are passed on to them. When a concept thus grows out of anecdotes cemented together with practical necessity, it is bound to acquire elements of mystery. So far as "vertigo" is concerned, no one really knows more than a small part of the facts, but a great deal of the peril. Since aviators are not skilled observers of human behavior, they usually have only the vaguest understanding of their own feelings. Like other naive persons, therefore, they have simply adopted a term to cover a multitude of otherwise inexplicable events.

— Edgar Vinacke, "The Concept of Aviator's 'Vertigo'"

== See also ==
- Autokinetic effect
- Ghost rockets
- Green fireballs
- Will-o'-the-wisp
- Hessdalen lights
- List of UFO sightings
- Nazi UFOs
