= Val Johnson incident =

Alleged UFO encounter in 1979

Coordinates: 48°26′13″N 97°06′27″W

The Val Johnson incident was an alleged UFO encounter in Marshall County, Minnesota, reported by Deputy Sheriff Val Johnson in 1979.

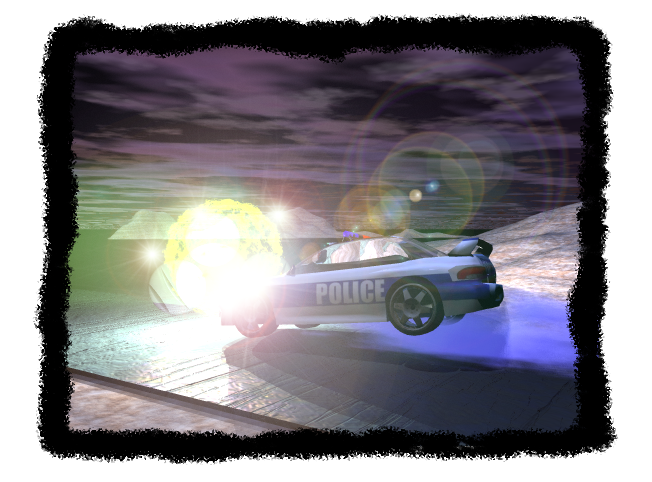
CGI reconstruction of the alleged incident.

== Incident ==
Johnson reported that while he was on patrol near Stephen, Minnesota, at about 2:00 am on August 27, 1979, he saw a beam of light just above the road. According to Johnson, the beam sped towards him, his squad car was engulfed in light, and he heard glass breaking. Johnson said he was unconscious for 39 minutes. When he awoke, he realized his wristwatch and the vehicle's clock had stopped for 14 minutes. The windshield was shattered, a headlight and red emergency light were damaged, and a thin radio aerial bent. Deputies responding to Johnson's call for help found the squad car sideways on the road. Johnson suffered bruises and eye irritation that a physician compared to "welder's burns". When the story received national publicity, Johnson told reporters the sudden attention had caused him and his family a great deal of emotional strain. On September 11, 1979, Johnson appeared as a guest on ABC's Good Morning America program.

== Responses ==
Ufologists, including Allan Hendry and Jerome Clark, consider the incident significant, with Clark claiming that Johnson refused to take a polygraph test because Johnson believed it "would only [serve to] satisfy people's morbid curiosity". UFO skeptic Philip Klass argued that the entire event was a hoax, and that Johnson had deliberately damaged his own patrol car.

== See also ==
- UFO sightings in the United States
- List of UFO sightings
