= Autokinetic effect =

Optical illusion

The autokinetic effect (also referred to as autokinesis and the autokinetic illusion) is a phenomenon of visual perception in which a stationary, small point of light in an otherwise dark or featureless environment appears to move. It was first recorded in 1799 by Alexander von Humboldt who observed illusory movement of a star in a dark sky, although he believed the movement was real. It is presumed to occur because motion perception is always relative to some reference point, and in darkness or in a featureless environment there is no reference point, so the position of the single point is undefined. The direction of the movements does not appear to be correlated with involuntary eye movements, but may be determined by errors between eye position and that specified by efference copy of the movement signals sent to the extraocular muscles. Richard Gregory suggested that, with lack of peripheral information, eye movements which correct movements due to muscle fatigue are wrongly interpreted as movement of the perceived light.

The amplitude of the movements is also undefined. Individual observers set their own frames of reference to judge amplitude (and possibly direction). Because the phenomenon is labile, it has been used to show the effects of social influence or suggestion on judgements. For example, if an observer who would otherwise say the light is moving one foot overhears another observer say the light is moving one yard, then the first observer will report that the light moved one yard. Discovery of the influence of suggestion on the autokinetic effect is often attributed to Sherif (1935), but it was recorded by Adams (1912), if not others.

Alexander von Humboldt observed the phenomenon in 1799 while looking at stars with the naked eye, but thought it was a real movement of the stars. Thus, he named them "Sternschwanken", meaning "swinging stars". It was not until 1857 that G. Schweitzer showed that it was a subjective phenomenon: several observers all simultaneously viewing the same star reported different directions of the movement.

Many sightings of UFOs have been attributed to the autokinetic effect when looking at stars or planets.

The US Navy started studying autokinesis in 1945 in an attempt to explain vertigo experiences reported by pilots, but this "kinetic illusion" is now categorized as a vestibular-induced illusion: see vestibular system.

== In literature ==
An evocative passage appears in H. G. Wells' novel The War of the Worlds. Although Wells ascribes the apparent "swimming" of the planet to telescope vibration and eye fatigue, it is likely that the autokinetic effect is also being described:

Looking through the telescope, one saw a circle of deep blue and the little round planet swimming in the field. It seemed such a little thing, so bright and small and still, faintly marked with transverse stripes, and slightly flattened from the perfect round. But so little it was, so silvery warm—a pin's-head of light! It was as if it quivered, but really this was the telescope vibrating with the activity of the clockwork that kept the planet in view. As I watched, the planet seemed to grow larger and smaller and to advance and recede, but that was simply that my eye was tired. Forty million miles it was from us—more than forty million miles of void. Few people realise the immensity of vacancy in which the dust of the material universe swims.

== In aviation ==
The effect is well known as an illusion affecting pilots who fly at night. It is particularly dangerous for pilots flying in formation or rejoining a refueling tanker at night. Steps that can be taken to prevent or overcome the phenomenon include:

- Shifting your gaze frequently to avoid prolonged fixation on light sources.
- Attempting to view a target with a reference to stationary structures or landmarks.
- Making eye, head, and body movements to eliminate the illusion.
- Monitoring the flight instruments to prevent or resolve any perceptual conflict.

== In combat ==
In his book documenting the opening stages of the second Gulf War from his position embedded with the 1st Marine Reconnaissance Battalion, Evan Wright documents an incident during which, at night in the Iraqi desert, the Marines observed the lights of a town approximately 40 kilometers away. These lights appeared to be moving and were suspected of belonging to a large combat force moving out to attack the marines. An airstrike was called in on the estimated position of the lights—estimated to be around 15 kilometers away—which resulted in no enemy assets being destroyed. It was later suggested by Major Shoup of the battalion that this misidentification was a result of autokinesis. In the HBO mini-series based on the book, this information was imparted to the viewer by the character of Sergeant Brad Colbert, who had correctly deduced that it was a town in both versions.

Night fighter and night bomber crews during the Second World War reported encounters with mysterious aerial phenomena, nicknamed foo fighters, which may have been caused by autokinesis or a similar effect.

== Autostasis ==
The opposite effect of autokinesis is autostasis. It is when a moving bright light in a dark sky appears stationary.

== See also ==
- Spatial disorientation
- Ganzfeld effect

== Bibliography ==
- Adams, H. F. (1912). Autokinetic sensations. Psychological Monographs, 14, 1-45.
- Schweitzer, G. (1857). Über das Sternschwanken. Bulletin de la Société impériale des naturalistes de Moscou. 30: 440–457; 31: 477–500. Source: Skeptic, Volume 17. No. 2 2012, pages 38–43.
- Sherif, M. (1935). A study of some social factors in perception. Archives of Psychology, 27(187) .
- U.S. Air Force (2000). Flying Operations, Instrument Flight Procedures. Air Force Manual 11-217. Volume 1, 29 December 2000.
- Fundamentals of Aerospace Medicine, second edition, by Roy L. DeHart. Port City Press, 1996.
- Generation Kill by Evan Wright. (2005) ISBN 0-552-15189-0 Chapter 17, Page 236.
- Gregory, Richard L. and Oliver L. Zangwill. 1963. "The Origin of the Autokinetic Effect." Quarterly Journal of Experimental Psychology, 15, 255–261.
