= Stephen, Minnesota =

City in Minnesota, United States

- City
- Motto: Settle For Success
- Interactive map of Stephen, Minnesota
- Location within Minnesota
- Coordinates: 48.4524°N 96.8763°W
- Country: United States
- State: Minnesota
- County: Marshall
- Founded: 1878
- Incorporated: December 18, 1883
- Named for: George Stephen

Government
  - Type: Mayor–council
  - Mayor: David McGlynn
  - City Administrator: Kristen Gajeski
  - Councilmembers: Daniel Douglas; Austin Grochowski; Patsy Heggen; Brian Hendricks

Area
  - Total: 0.787 sq mi (2.039 km^{2})
  - Land: 0.787 sq mi (2.039 km^{2})
  - Water: 0 sq mi (0.000 km^{2}) 0.00%
- Elevation: 830 ft (253 m)

Population (2020)
  - Total: 592
  - Estimate (2025): 581
  - Density: 752/sq mi (290/km^{2})
- Time zone: UTC–6 (Central (CST))
  - Summer (DST): UTC–5 (CDT)
- ZIP Code: 56757
- Area code: 218
- FIPS code: 27-62698
- GNIS feature ID: 2395964
- Website: stephenmn.com

Stephen is a city in Marshall County, Minnesota, United States. The population was 592 as of the 2020 census, and was estimated at 581 in 2025.

== History ==
A post office called Stephen has been in operation since 1883. The city was named for George Stephen, a railroad official.

In 1979, the Val Johnson Incident happened near Stephen.

== Geography ==
According to the United States Census Bureau, the city has a total area of 0.787 square miles (2.04 km^{2}), all land.

== Demographics ==
Historical population
Census	Pop.	Note	%±
1890	265		—
1900	513		93.6%
1910	618		20.5%
1920	581		−6.0%
1930	474		−18.4%
1940	673		42.0%
1950	877		30.3%
1960	858		−2.2%
1970	904		5.4%
1980	898		−0.7%
1990	707		−21.3%
2000	708		0.1%
2010	658		−7.1%
2020	592		−10.0%
2025 (est.)	581		−1.9%
U.S. Decennial Census; 2020 Census

According to realtor website Zillow, the average price of a home as of October 30, 2026, in Stephen was $137,534.

As of the 2024 American Community Survey, there were 229 estimated households in Stephen with an average of 2.14 persons per household. The city has a median household income of $71,250. Approximately 9.9% of the city's population lives at or below the poverty line. Stephen has an estimated 59.3% employment rate, with 20.7% of the population holding a bachelor's degree or higher and 87.3% holding a high school diploma. There were 288 housing units at an average density of 365.95 per square mile (141.29/km^{2}).

The top five reported languages (people were allowed to report up to two languages, thus the figures will generally add to more than 100%) were English (84.0%), Spanish (14.0%), Indo-European (2.0%), Asian and Pacific Islander (0.0%), and Other (0.0%).

The median age in the city was 51.6 years.

Stephen, Minnesota – racial and ethnic composition Note: the US Census treats Hispanic/Latino as an ethnic category. This table excludes Latinos from the racial categories and assigns them to a separate category. Hispanics/Latinos may be of any race.
Race / ethnicity (NH = non-Hispanic)
Race / ethnicity (NH = non-Hispanic)	Population 2000		Population 2010		Population 2020	
Race / ethnicity (NH = non-Hispanic)	Number	Percent	Number	Percent	Number	Percent
White alone (NH)	636	89.83%	590	89.67%	540	91.22%
Black or African American alone (NH)	0	0.00%	0	0.00%	0	0.00%
Native American or Alaska Native alone (NH)	5	0.71%	1	0.15%	0	0.00%
Asian alone (NH)	1	0.14%	0	0.00%	0	0.00%
Pacific Islander alone (NH)	0	0.00%	0	0.00%	0	0.00%
Other race alone (NH)	0	0.00%	0	0.00%	1	0.17%
Mixed race or multiracial (NH)	8	1.13%	1	0.15%	3	0.51%
Hispanic or Latino (any race)	58	8.19%	66	10.03%	48	8.11%
Total	708	100.00%	658	100.00%	592	100.00%

=== 2020 census ===
As of the 2020 census, there were 592 people, 258 households, and 159 families residing in the city. The population density was 752.22 inhabitants per square mile (290.43/km^{2}). There were 298 housing units at an average density of 378.65 per square mile (146.20/km^{2}). The racial makeup of the city was 94.26% White, 0.00% African American, 0.00% Native American, 0.00% Asian, 0.00% Pacific Islander, 2.03% from some other races and 3.72% from two or more races. Hispanic or Latino people of any race were 8.11% of the population.

=== 2010 census ===
As of the 2010 census, there were 658 people, 304 households, and 174 families residing in the city. The population density was 809.35 inhabitants per square mile (312.49/km^{2}). There were 346 housing units at an average density of 425.58 per square mile (164.32/km^{2}). The racial makeup of the city was 97.87% White, 0.00% African American, 0.15% Native American, 0.00% Asian, 0.00% Pacific Islander, 1.67% from some other races and 0.30% from two or more races. Hispanic or Latino people of any race were 10.03% of the population.

There were 304 households, of which 21.4% had children under the age of 18 living with them, 48.4% were married couples living together, 5.6% had a female householder with no husband present, 3.3% had a male householder with no wife present, and 42.8% were non-families. 40.1% of all households were made up of individuals, and 19.7% had someone living alone who was 65 years of age or older. The average household size was 2.16 and the average family size was 2.93.

The median age in the city was 46.8 years. 20.8% of residents were under the age of 18; 4.9% were between the ages of 18 and 24; 21.4% were from 25 to 44; 29.7% were from 45 to 64; and 23.1% were 65 years of age or older. The gender makeup of the city was 49.4% male and 50.6% female.

=== 2000 census ===
As of the 2000 census, there were 708 people, 292 households, and 188 families residing in the city. The population density was 864.97 inhabitants per square mile (333.97/km^{2}). There were 331 housing units at an average density of 404.39 per square mile (156.14/km^{2}). The racial makeup of the city was 93.36% White, 0.00% African American, 0.71% Native American, 0.14% Asian, 0.00% Pacific Islander, 4.66% from some other races and 1.13% from two or more races. Hispanic or Latino people of any race were 8.19% of the population.

There were 292 households, out of which 28.4% had children under the age of 18 living with them, 56.5% were married couples living together, 4.5% had a female householder with no husband present, and 35.3% were non-families. 33.2% of all households were made up of individuals, and 22.6% had someone living alone who was 65 years of age or older. The average household size was 2.42 and the average family size was 3.13.

In the city, the population was spread out, with 26.0% under the age of 18, 7.1% from 18 to 24, 20.6% from 25 to 44, 23.7% from 45 to 64, and 22.6% who were 65 years of age or older. The median age was 43 years. For every 100 females, there were 99.4 males. For every 100 females age 18 and over, there were 95.5 males.

The median income for a household in the city was $33,207, and the median income for a family was $42,969. Males had a median income of $31,103 versus $21,667 for females. The per capita income for the city was $17,152. About 3.3% of families and 6.2% of the population were below the poverty line, including 2.4% of those under age 18 and 12.7% of those age 65 or over.
