= Thornton Leigh Page =

American professor of astronomy

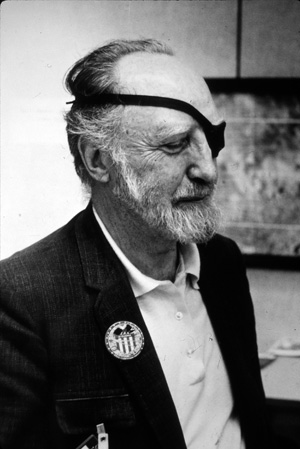
- Born: 13 August 1913; New Haven, Connecticut
- Died: 2 January 1996 (aged 82); Houston, Texas
- Spouses: Helen Ashbee (m. 1938; div. 1945) Lou Williams (m. 1948)
- Children: Tanya (with Helen); Mary Anne and Leigh II (with Lou)
- Parent(s): Leigh and Mary Page
- Scientific career
- Education: Yale (B.S.); Oxford (D.Phil.)
- Awards: Rhodes scholar Fellow, Royal Astronomical Society
- Thesis: (1938)
- Doctoral advisor: Harry H. Plaskett; Edward A. Milne
- Military career
- Allegiance: United States of America
- Branch: United States Navy
- Service years: 1942-1946
- Rank: Lt. Commander
- Conflicts: World War II

Thornton Leigh Page was an American professor of astronomy at the University of Chicago and at Wesleyan University. He became embroiled in the controversy over unidentified flying objects (UFOs) after serving briefly on the Robertson Panel, a Central Intelligence Agency–sponsored committee of scientists assembled in Washington, D.C. from 14–18 January 1953 to study the available evidence on UFOs.

== Early life ==
Thornton Page was born in New Haven, CT on 13 August 1913 to Leigh Page, a physics instructor at Yale University, and Mary Page, trained as a nurse. He went on to receive a B.S. in physics from Yale in 1934, and was named a Rhodes Scholar, later earning a D.Phil. from Oxford University in 1938.

== Military career ==
During World War II, he served in the Pacific Theater with the minelaying operations research group, serving in Guam, Tinian, and at sea. He was in Tokyo for the Japanese surrender, and had reported on the atomic tests at Bikini.

== Professional career ==
After his WWII service, Thornton Page served as a professor of astrophysics for the University of Chicago from 1946 until 1950. He then worked for the U.S. Army's Operations Research Office (ORO) from 1951 until 1958. In 1952, Thornton Page became the first editor of Journal of the Operations Research Society of America. As an astronomer for the ORO, he became embroiled in the controversy involving Unidentified Flying Objects in 1953.

In 1958, he became a professor and head of the astronomy department at Wesleyan University. He resigned from Wesleyan in 1971 and began working for the United States Naval Research Laboratory until his retirement in 1976. He was elected to the 2002 class of Fellows of the Institute for Operations Research and the Management Sciences.

== Personal life ==
In late 1961, he was seriously injured in an automobile accident where he broke several bones and lost sight in one eye. He died in Houston on 2 January 1996.
