= Center for UFO Studies =

U.S. UFO research organization

Center for UFO Studies (CUFOS)
- Type: Nonprofit organization
- Founded: 1973
- Headquarters: Chicago, Illinois, United States
- Key people: J. Allen Hynek, Founder
- Website: www.cufos.org

The Center for UFO Studies (CUFOS) is a privately funded UFO research group. The group was founded in 1973 by J. Allen Hynek, who at the time was chair of the Department of Astronomy at Northwestern University in Illinois.

== History ==
Hynek was a scientific consultant for Project Blue Book, the United States Air Force official study of the UFO phenomenon from 1948 to 1969. Although Hynek started out as a skeptic and helped the Air Force to debunk most UFO reports, he gradually became convinced that a small number of UFO cases were not hoaxes or explainable as misidentifications of natural phenomena, and that these cases might represent something extraordinary—even alien visitation from other planets. When the Air Force shut down Project Blue Book in 1969, Hynek, in 1973, founded the Center for UFO Studies (CUFOS) to continue to collect and study UFO reports. Ufologist James W. Moseley wrote that CUFOS was "... the first real attempt to set up a private research group genuinely dedicated to scientific investigations and study of UFOs." Moseley observed that CUFOS "wasn't a saucer club and, for a while, wasn't open to general membership. Participation was restricted to scientists and other professionals who donated their time and expertise, Hynek's invisible college. This wouldn't last—though CUFOS has."

In November 2020, the case files of CUFOS were moved to Albuquerque, NM where they are currently curated on behalf of CUFOS by The National UFO Historical Records Center.

== Operation ==
Started in Evanston, Illinois, but now based in Chicago, CUFOS continues to be a small research organization stressing scientific analysis of UFO cases. Its extensive archives include historically valuable files from defunct civilian research groups such as National Investigations Committee On Aerial Phenomena (NICAP), the largest UFO research group of the 1950s and 1960s. Following Hynek's death in 1986, CUFOS was renamed the J. Allen Hynek Center for UFO Studies in his honor. Mark Rodeghier, a current associate editor of the Journal of Scientific Exploration, has been the Director of CUFOS since 1986. Ufologists who have served on the CUFOS Board of Directors are Jerome Clark, UFO historian and author of The UFO Encyclopedia; Michael D. Swords, a retired professor of natural science at Western Michigan University; and Thomas E. Bullard, a folklorist at Indiana University.

The Center for UFO Studies (CUFOS) has two principal activities. First, it maintains a library and archives of UFO-related materials, which are open for use by researchers and investigators who are writing about UFO-related topics. These materials include books, articles, documents, and sighting reports. Second, CUFOS continues to compile and analyze reports of UFO incidents from around the world.

== See also ==
- List of UFO organizations

== Sources ==
- Clark, Jerome (1998). The UFO Encyclopedia. Detroit: Omnigraphics.
- Moseley, James W. and Karl T. Pflock (2002). Shockingly Close to the Truth! Amherst, NY: Prometheus Books.
