= Jimmy Carter UFO incident =

1969 incident regarding the sighting of a UFO

Jimmy Carter, United States president from 1977 until 1981, reported seeing an unidentified flying object while at Leary, Georgia, in 1969. While serving as governor of Georgia, Carter was asked (on September 14, 1973) by the International UFO Bureau in Oklahoma City to file a report of the sighting, and he filed a statement on September 18, mailed September 20. Since its writing, the report has been discussed several times by both ufologists and by members of the mainstream media.

== Sighting ==
One evening in 1969, two years before he became Governor of Georgia, Carter was preparing to give a speech at a Lions Club meeting. He reported that at about 7:15 pm, one of the guests called his attention to a strange bright white object, about as bright as the moon, that was about 30 degrees above the horizon to the west of where they were standing. It moved toward their direction, but stopped beyond a stand of pine trees some distance from them. The object then changed color, first to blue, then to red, then back to white, before appearing to recede into the distance.

Carter felt that the object was self-illuminated, and not solid in nature. Carter's report indicates that it was witnessed by about 10 or 12 other people, and was in view for 10 to 12 minutes before it passed out of sight.

In 1973, Carter reiterated:

There were about twenty of us standing outside of a little restaurant, I believe, a high school lunch room, and a kind of green light appeared in the western sky. This was right after sundown. It got brighter and brighter. And then it eventually disappeared. It didn't have any solid substance to it, it was just a very peculiar-looking light. None of us could understand what it was.

Speaking in a 2005 interview, Carter said:

All of a sudden, one of the men looked up and said, 'Look, over in the west!' And there was a bright light in the sky. We all saw it. And then the light, it got closer and closer to us. And then it stopped, I don't know how far away, but it stopped beyond the pine trees. And all of a sudden it changed color to blue, and then it changed to red, then back to white. And we were trying to figure out what in the world it could be, and then it receded into the distance.

=== Date ===
The exact date on which the sighting occurred has been called into question by investigators. According to the report that he filed with the International UFO Bureau four years after the incident, Carter saw the UFO in October 1969. However, investigators have cited Lions Club records as evidence that it occurred nine months earlier.

According to a meeting report that he filed with the Lions Club, Carter gave his Leary speech on January 6, 1969, not in October. The setting of his January meeting as described in his report to the Lions Club also matches the setting that he would later describe to the media when speaking about his sighting. His report to the Lions Club made no mention of the sighting itself.

Other evidence rules out the October 1969 date and is consistent with January 1969. First, Carter visited the Leary Lions Club in his capacity as district governor of the Lions Club. His term ended in June 1969. Second, the Leary Lions Club disbanded several months before October 1969.

== Object and investigation ==
According to an investigation carried out in 1976, most of those present at the meeting either did not recall the event, or did not recall it as being anything important. According to Fred Hart, the only guest contacted who remembered seeing the object: "It seems like there was a little—like a blue light or something or other in the sky that night—like some kind of weather balloon they send out or something ... it had been pretty far back in my mind."

While puzzled by the object and its origins, Carter himself later said that, while he had considered the object to be a UFO—on the grounds it was unexplained—his knowledge of physics had meant he had not believed himself to be witnessing an alien spacecraft.

On January 6, 1969, the sky was clear in Leary and the planet Venus was near its maximum brightness and in the direction described by Carter. Ufologist Robert Sheaffer concluded that the object that Carter witnessed was a misidentification of Venus. Ufologist Allan Hendry did calculations and agrees with the assessment of it being Venus. This could also be the Venus "halo", as was discussed on The Skeptics' Guide to the Universe podcast #105 in a 2007 interview with Jimmy Carter. In the interview Carter stated that he did not believe the object was Venus, explaining that he was an amateur astronomer and knew what Venus looked like. He also said that as a scientist he did not believe it was an alien craft and at the time assumed it was probably a military aircraft from a nearby base. However, he said that the object did not make any sound like a helicopter would do. Carter also said that he did not believe that any extraterrestrials have visited Earth. In the podcast interview, he also stated he knows of no government cover-up of extraterrestrial visits and that the rumors that the CIA refused to give him information about UFOs are not true.

In 2016, the hosts of episode #561 of The Skeptics' Guide to the Universe podcast read a letter forwarded by a member of the Carter family from Carl G. "Jere" Justus, giving his explanation of Carter's UFO sighting:

After recently reading the book Georgia Myths & Legends, by Augusta Chronicle columnist Don Rhodes, specifically Chapter 5, "Jimmy Carter and the UFO", I am virtually certain that I have identified the source of what it was that President Carter saw. In the 1960s and early 70s, I worked on an Air Force sponsored project that studied the upper atmosphere using releases of glowing chemical clouds, produced by rockets launched from Eglin AFB rocket range in Florida. Some of these chemical clouds, notably sodium and barium, were visible by the process of resonance scattering of sunlight. Clouds of this type had to be launched not long after sunset or not long before sunrise. This was due to the fact that the cloud had to be in sunlight at high altitude, while it was still dark enough at ground level for the cloud to be visible against the dark sky. In Carter's official 1973 UFO report, as given in the Rhodes book, he stated that he had seen the phenomenon in October, 1969, at 7:15 pm EST. However, it has been determined from Lions Club records that Carter must have seen the "UFO" when he spoke to their Leary, GA Chapter on January 6, 1969. The report "U.S. Space Science Program Report to COSPAR, 1970" (QB504.U54, Appendix I, page 154) documents that there was a barium cloud launched from Eglin AFB (Rocket Number AG7.626) and released on January 6, 1969 at 7:35 pm EST (January 7, 1969, 0035 UTC) [COSPAR stands for Committee on Space Research]. The reported altitude for this cloud was 152 km. With a distance between Leary, GA and Eglin AFB, FL of about 234 km, this cloud would have appeared in the sky at an elevation of 33 degrees (consistent with Carter's estimate of a 30 degree elevation). Carter's report notes that stars were visible, so the night must have been clear. I can verify from personal experience that under clear skies, a barium cloud such as this would easily have been visible from the distance of Leary, GA. Carter reported the UFO "appeared from West". The direction of Eglin AFB from Leary, GA is approximately WSW. Thus this barium cloud at Eglin is consistent with Carter's reported "UFO" as to time, elevation, and direction. Furthermore, the appearance reported by Carter is totally consistent with a high-altitude barium cloud. His report stated that it was "bluish at first, then reddish, luminous, not solid". A neutral barium cloud would initially glow bluish or greenish, with parts of it taking on a reddish glow as some of the barium becomes ionized in the high altitude sunlight. The size and brightness, reported as being about that of the moon, would also be consistent with a barium cloud at Eglin, as viewed from Leary, GA. Carter has been reported as saying that he never believed that he had seen an alien spacecraft, but that he had no idea exactly what it was. I'm interested in exploring if this information could be relayed to President Carter, so that if he wishes to, he can better understand what it was that he saw back then.

In 2020, Justus completed an extensive study of the high-altitude barium release clouds, concluding that what Carter saw was "totally consistent" with what was launched that evening from Eglin AFB. Justus described several physical aspects supporting consistency, and submitted a copy of the report for archival at the Jimmy Carter Library.

== Personal impact ==
The sighting is said to have had a personal impact on Carter and his perception of UFOs and UFO sightings. During his 1976 election campaign, he is said to have told reporters that, as a result of it, he would institute a policy of openness if he were elected to office, saying:

One thing's for sure, I'll never make fun of people who say they've seen unidentified objects in the sky. If I become President, I'll make every piece of information this country has about UFO sightings available to the public and the scientists.

Despite his earlier pledge, once elected, Carter distanced himself from disclosure, citing "defense implications" as being behind his decision.

== 1970s media reports ==
- "Carter Once Saw a UFO on 'Very Sober Occasion'", by Howell Raines, Atlanta Constitution, Sept. 14, 1973, p. 1D
- Carter's story appeared in the June 8, 1976, issue of The National Enquirer. This account contained a number of errors, including incorrectly stating that the event occurred in Thomaston, Georgia in 1973, and that the sighting was after the club meeting.
- Hayden Hughs of International UFO Bureau wrote an article that appeared in the November 1976 issue of Argosy UFO (a spin-off of Argosy).
- In February 1977, NICAP republished Carter's original report in UFO Investigator, but altered his handwritten report to make it appear that it had been submitted directly to NICAP as a typed document.
- The April 30, 1977, edition of The Washington Post ran the story on the front page, incorrectly giving the date as 1973. The identification of the UFO as Venus ran in a small item in the May 9, 1977, issue.
- "President Carter's 'UFO' Is Identified as the Planet Venus", by Robert Sheaffer, Humanist magazine, July–August, 1977, p. 46
- "Learyites leery of Carter's encounter: No one recalls 1970 UFO spotting", by Tom Tiede, Mt. Pleasant Daily Tribune (Texas), Feb. 2, 1978

== See also ==
- Jimmy Carter rabbit incident
- List of reported UFO sightings
- UFO sightings in the United States
