= Robertson Panel =

1953 scientific committee for UAP reports

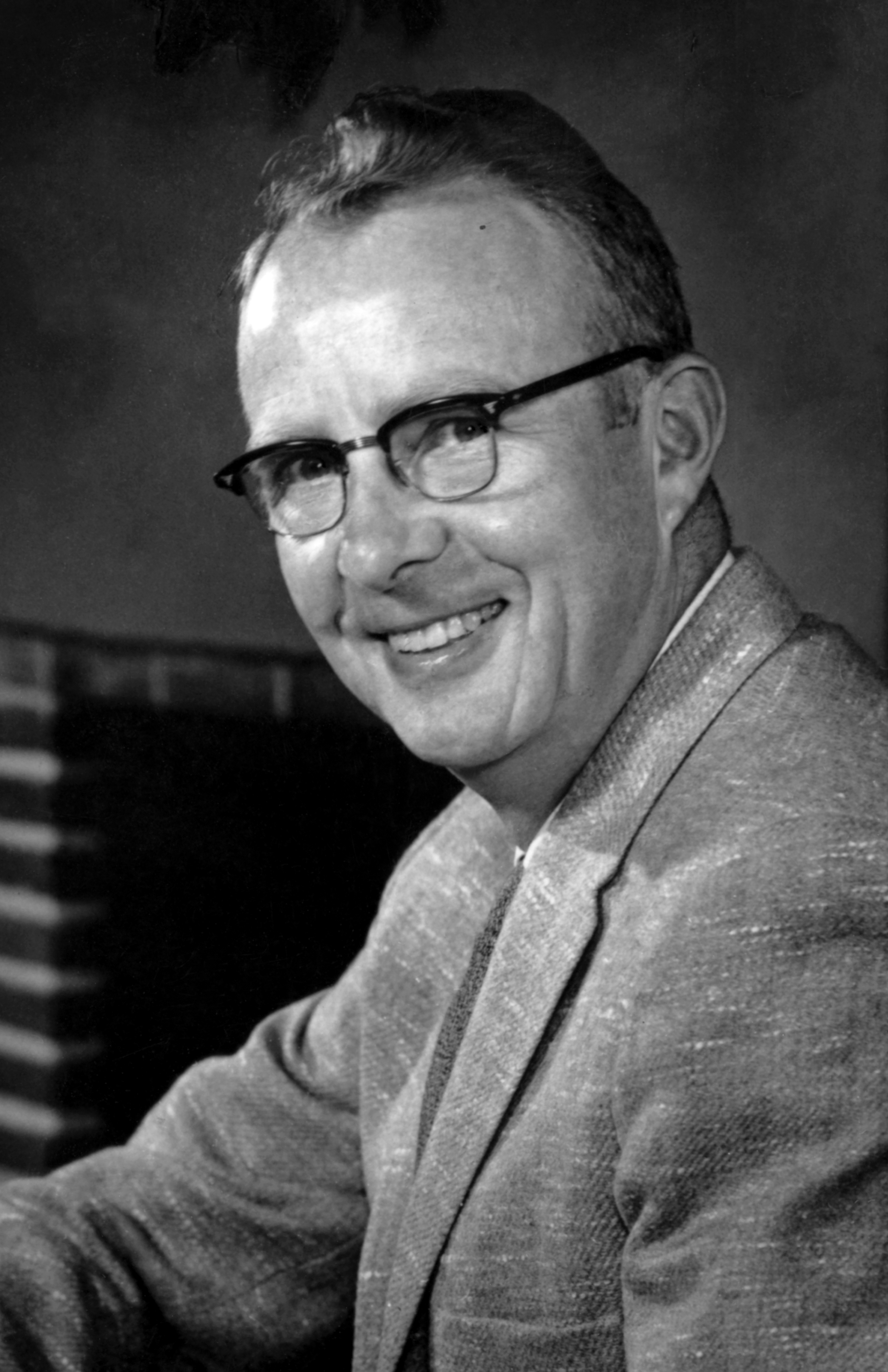
Robertson Panel member Luis Alvarez.

The Robertson Panel was a scientific committee which met in January 1953 headed by Howard P. Robertson. The Panel arose from a recommendation to the Intelligence Advisory Committee (IAC) in December 1952 from a Central Intelligence Agency (CIA) review of the U.S. Air Force investigation into unidentified flying objects, Project Blue Book. The CIA review itself was in response to widespread reports of unidentified flying objects, especially in the Washington, D.C. area during the summer of 1952.

The panel was briefed on U.S. military activities and intelligence; hence the report was originally classified Secret. Later declassified, the Robertson Panel's report concluded that UFOs were not a direct threat to national security, but could pose an indirect threat by overwhelming standard military communications due to public interest in the subject. Most UFO reports, they concluded, could be explained as misidentification of mundane aerial objects, and the remaining minority could, in all likelihood, be similarly explained with further study.

The Robertson Panel recommended that a public education campaign should be undertaken in order to reduce public interest in the subject, minimising the risk of swamping Air Defence systems with reports at critical times, and that civilian UFO groups should be monitored. The Robertson Panel's report was contained within a larger internal CIA report by F C Durant, a CIA officer who served as Secretary to the Panel, which summarises the activities of the panel and its conclusions. This wider document is commonly referred to as the Durant Report.

== Background to the formation of the Robertson Panel ==
In 1952 there was a significant increase in the number of UFO reports received by the USAF Blue Book project, tasked with investigating such reports at the time. This wave included widely reported incidents over Washington DC in July, over the weekends of July 19–20 and 26–27. CIA historian Gerald Haines noted "A massive build-up of sightings over the United States in 1952, especially in July, alarmed the Truman administration. On July 19 and 20, radar scopes at Washington National Airport and Andrews Air Force Base tracked mysterious blips. On July 27, the blips reappeared. The Air Force scrambled interceptor aircraft to investigate, but they found nothing. The incidents, however, caused headlines across the country. The White House wanted to know what was happening ...". The reference to White House interest is consistent with a telephone call Captain (later Major) Edward Ruppelt, Blue Book Project Director at the time, received from Brigadier General Landry, Truman's military aide, on July 28, inquiring as to the causes of the Washington reports of the previous days.

In a July 29, 1952 memo to the deputy director of Intelligence, Acting Assistant Director for Scientific Intelligence Ralph Clark commented; "In the past several weeks a number of radar and visual sightings of unidentified aerial objects have been reported. Although this office has maintained a continuing review of such reported sightings during the past three years, a special study group has been formed to review this subject to date. D/CI will participate in the study with D/SI and a report should be ready about 15 August." This is the earliest written record of the CIA study which led to the Robertson Panel.

The precise origins of the decision to establish the review are unclear. A claim that the study was initiated by a Presidential request to the National Security Council (NSC) appears to be incorrect. No NSC meetings were held on the relevant dates and the President was in Kansas on July 27 and 28, resting after attending the Democratic Party convention on the 26th. The Ralph L Clark memo of July 29 contains a footnote reference to a meeting, "OSI:FCD:RLC mtw (28July52)" which appears to indicate a July 28, 1952 meeting between F C Durant and Clark on this subject. The decision to initiate the CIA study appears therefore to have been taken around July 28, although D/CI (Director of Central Intelligence) involvement in the study and Haines' reference to White House interest suggests that the FCD:RLC meeting was not itself the formal decision point. The decision appears to have been an operational decision taken outside of formal structures such as NSC meetings, as was common for urgent matters.

The CIA analysts were broadly skeptical concerning the possibility that some UFO reports may represent extraterrestrial objects or objects of terrestrial (either American or Russian) manufacture, favouring the hypothesis that currently unidentified reports were misidentifications of conventional objects or natural phenomena. In an internal CIA paper dated August 19,1952 the analyst notes:

"In summarizing this discussion, I would restate that on three of the main theories in explanation of these phenomena, - a US development, a Russian development, and space ships - the evidence either of fact or of logic is so strongly against them that they warrant at present no more than speculative consideration. However, it is important that there are many who believe in them and will continue to do so in spite of any official pronouncement which may be made. This whole affair has demonstrated that there is a fair proportion of our population which is mentally conditioned to acceptance of the incredible. Thus, we arrive at two danger points which, in a situation of international tension, seem to have National Security implications."

The analyst went on to note the absence of coverage of the subject in the Soviet press, which it was felt could only represent a policy position and highlighted the "question of why and of whether or not these sightings could be used from a psychological warfare point of view either offensively or defensively. Air Force is aware of this and had investigated a number of the civilian groups that have sprung up to follow the subject. One - the Civilian Saucer Committee in California has substantial funds, strongly influences the editorial policy of a number of newspapers and has leaders whose connections may be questionable. Air Force is watching this organization because of its power to touch off mass hysteria and panic. Perhaps we, from an intelligence point of view, should watch for any indication of Russian efforts to capitalize upon this present American credulity.

Of even greater moment is the second danger. Our air warning system will undoubtedly always depend upon a combination of radar scanning and visual observation. We give Russia the capability of delivering an air attack against us, yet at any given moment now, there may be a dozen official unidentified sightings plus many unofficial. At the moment of attack, how will we, on an instant basis, distinguish hardware from phantom?"

These twin concerns – potential for psychological warfare and overloading of air defence systems, were formalised in a memorandum to the Director of Central Intelligence, General Walter Bedell Smith on September 11, 1952. This memorandum noted that although the Air Force study was adequate on a case-by-case basis it was not addressing the more fundamental question of enabling rapid positive identification of reports; "... the study makes no attempt to solve the more fundamental aspect of the problem which is to determine definitely the nature of the various phenomena which are causing these sightings, or to discover means by which these causes and their visual and electronic effects may be immediately identified. Our consultant panel stated that these solutions would probably be found on the margins or just beyond the frontiers of our present phenomena". The memorandum went on to make the recommendations:

a. The Director of Central Intelligence advise the National Security Council of the security implications inherent in the flying saucer problem with the request that, under his statutory coordinating authority, The Director of Central Intelligence be empowered to institute through the appropriate agencies, either within or without the government, the investigation and research necessary to solve the problem of instant positive identification of "unidentified flying objects".

b. CIA, under its assigned responsibilities, and in cooperation with the psychological strategy board immediately investigate possible offensive or defensive utilization of the phenomena for psychological warfare purposes both for and against the United States, advising those agencies charged with U.S. internal security of any pertinent findings affecting their areas of responsibility.

c. On the basis of these programs of research, CIA develop and recommend for adoption by the National Security Council a policy of public information which will minimize the risk of panic.

On October 13, 1952, however, a memorandum from the assistant director for Intelligence Co-ordination, James Reber to the Deputy Director Intelligence argued that fundamental research into the question of positive identification was the responsibility of the Defence Department and that whilst investigating Soviet knowledge of the phenomena was a "primary concern" for the CIA it "is far too early in view of the present state of our knowledge regarding Flying Saucers for psychological warfare planners to start planning how the United States might use U.S. Flying Saucers against the enemy". Reber went on to recommend that when "... intelligence has submitted the National Estimate on Flying Saucers there will be the time and basis for a public policy to reduce or restrain mass hysteria."

As early as August 15, CIA analysts, despite their overall skeptical conclusions had noted, "Sightings of UFOs reported at Los Alamos and Oak Ridge, at a time when the background radiation count had risen inexplicably. Here we run out of even "blue yonder" explanations that might be tenable, and, we still are left with numbers of incredible reports from credible observers." On December 2, 1952 CIA Assistant Director Chadwell noted, "Recent reports reaching CIA indicated that further action was desirable and another briefing by the cognizant A-2 and ATIC personnel was held on November 25. At this time, the reports of incidents convince us that there is something going on that must have immediate attention. The details of some of these incidents have been discussed by AD/SI with DDCI. Sightings of unexplained objects at great altitudes and traveling at high speeds in the vicinity of major U.S. defense installations are of such nature that they are not attributable to natural phenomena or known types of aerial vehicles".

Chadwell's December 2 memorandum contained the draft of recommendations for the NSC, which were:

1. The Director of Central Intelligence shall formulate and carry out a program of intelligence and research activities as required to solve the problem of instant positive identification of unidentified flying objects.

2. Upon call of the Director of Central Intelligence, Government departments and agencies shall provide assistance in this program of intelligence and research to the extent of their capacity provided, however, that the DCI shall avoid duplication of activities presently directed toward the solution of this problem.

3. This effort shall be coordinated with the military services and the Research and Development Board of the Department of Defense, with the Psychological Board and other Governmental agencies as appropriate.

4. The Director of Central Intelligence shall disseminate information concerning the program of intelligence and research activities in this field to the various departments and agencies which have authorized interest therein.""

On December 4, 1952, the Intelligence Advisory Committee agreed:

The Director of Central Intelligence will:

a. Enlist the services of selected scientists to review and appraise the available evidence in the light of pertinent scientific theories.

b. Draft and circulate to the IAC a proposed NSCID, which would signify the IAC concerning the subject and authorize coordination with appropriate non-IAC departments and agencies.

From the IAC minutes of December 4 and the earlier CIA documents it appears clear that the Robertson Panel was the outcome of recommendation (a) of the IAC decision but that this formed part of a wider intended programme of action aimed at enabling rapid positive identification of UFOs from an air defense perspective (i.e. identifying actual Soviet aircraft from misidentified natural phenomena or other conventional objects) and a desire to reduce reporting of UFOs, which were seen as clogging up air defense communication channels and created the risk of exploitation of this effect. The inter-relationships between these wider aspects of the CIA's recommendations and the Battelle Memorial Institute's study, culminating in Blue Book Special Report 14, which identified a statistically significant difference between 'unknowns' and UFO reports that could subsequently be identified, or the study group referenced in a Canadian government document as operating as early as 1950 under the chairmanship of Dr Vannevar Bush, then head of the Joint Research and Development Board, to discover the 'modus operandi' of UFOs are unclear.

== The Robertson Panel ==
The Robertson Panel first met formally on January 14, 1953, under the direction of Howard P. Robertson. He was a physicist, a CIA consultant, and the director of the Defense Department Weapons Evaluation Group. He was instructed by OSI to assemble a group of prominent scientists to review the Air Force's UFO files. In preparation for this, Robertson first personally reviewed Air Force files and procedures. The Air Force had recently commissioned the Battelle Memorial Institute to scientifically study all of the UFO reports collected by Project Sign, Project Grudge and Project Blue Book. Robertson hoped to draw on their statistical results, but Battelle insisted that they needed much more time to conduct a proper study. Other panel members were respected scientists who had worked on other classified military projects or studies. All were then skeptical of UFO reports, though to varying degrees. Apart from Robertson, the panel included:

- Luis Alvarez, physicist, radar expert (and later, a Nobel Prize recipient);
- Frederick C. Durant, CIA officer, secretary to the panel and missile expert;
- Samuel Abraham Goudsmit, Brookhaven National Laboratories nuclear physicist;
- Thornton Leigh Page, astrophysicist, radar expert, deputy director of Johns Hopkins Operations Research Office;
- Lloyd Berkner, physicist;
- J. Allen Hynek, astronomer and consultant to Blue Book presented to the panel, but was not a full member.

Most of what is known about the actual proceedings of the meetings comes from notes kept by Durant which were later submitted as a memo to the NSC and commonly referred to as the Durant Report. In addition, various participants would later comment on what transpired from their perspective. Captain (later Major) Edward Ruppelt, then head of Project Blue Book, first revealed the existence of the secret panel in his 1956 book, but without revealing names of panel members.

=== Informal meeting ===
Thornton Page later stated that the panel members met informally prior to the main panel meetings, with 'no outsiders'. At this meeting "H.P. Robertson told us in the first private (no outsiders) session that our job was to reduce public concern, and show that UFO reports could be explained by conventional reasoning." This would suggest that the remit of the panel and its subsequent conclusions should be seen as part of the process of implementing the recommendations of CIA's own review of the UFO situation.

=== Formal meetings ===
The Panel had four consecutive days of formal meetings. In total, they met for 12 hours and reviewed 23 cases out of 2,331 Air Force UFO cases on record (or about 1%), although Ruppelt wrote that the Panel studied their best cases.

On the first day, the panel viewed two motion pictures of UFOs: the Mariana UFO Incident footage and 1952 Utah UFO Film (the latter was taken by naval photographer Chief Warrant Officer Delbert C. Newhouse). Two Navy photograph and film analysts (Lieutenants R.S. Neasham and Harry Woo) then reported their conclusion that, based on more than 1,000 man hours of analysis, the two films depicted objects that were not any known aircraft, creature or weather phenomena. Ruppelt then began a summary of Air Force efforts regarding UFO studies.

On the second day, Ruppelt finished his presentation. Hynek then discussed the Battelle study, and the panel discussed with Air Force personnel the problems inherent in monitoring UFO sightings. The panel then watched a motion picture film of seagulls, which Thornton Page had requested as the panel felt that the Tremonton, Utah film most probably showed birds.

On the third day, Air Force Major Dewey J. Fournet spoke to the panel. For over a year he had coordinated UFO affairs for the Pentagon. Fournet supported the extraterrestrial hypothesis as the best explanation for some puzzling UFO reports. For the remainder of the third day, the panel discussed their conclusions. Lloyd Berkner attended the panel meetings for the first time in the afternoon of the third day, Friday, January 16. Durant notes that "it was agreed that the Chairman should draft a report of the Panel to AD/SI that evening for review by the Panel the next morning. The meeting adjourned at 1715".

Durant records that the panel reconvened on the Saturday morning:

At 0945 the Chairman opened the seventh session and submitted a rough draft of the Panel Report to the members. This draft had been reviewed and approved earlier by Berkner. The next two and one-half hours were consumed in discussion and revision of the draft. At 1100 the AD/SI joined the meeting and reported that he had shown and discussed a copy of the initial rough draft to the Director of Intelligence, USAF, whose reaction was favorable ...". The final meeting of the panel took place that afternoon to finalise the report.

=== Conclusions and the Robertson Panel Report ===
Durant recorded:

"The Panel concluded unanimously that there was no evidence of a direct threat to national security in the objects sighted".
"... they did not find was any evidence that related the objects sighted to space travelers. Mr. Fournet, in his presentation, showed how he had eliminated each of the known and probable causes of sightings leaving him "extra-terrestrial" as the only one remaining in many cases. Fournet's background as an aeronautical engineer and technical intelligence officer (Project Officer, BLUEBOOK for 15 months) could not be slighted. However, the Panel could not accept any of the cases cited by him because they were raw, unevaluated reports. Terrestrial explanations of the sightings were suggested in some cases and in others the time of sighting was so short as to cause suspicion of visual impressions"

In relation to the two films considered by the panel:

The Panel studied these films, the case history, ATIC's interpretation, and received a briefing by representatives of the USN Photo Interpretation Laboratory on their analysis of the film. This team had expended (at Air Force request) approximately 1000 man hours of professional and sub-professional time in the preparation of graph plots of individual frames of the film, showing apparent and relative motion of objects and variation in their light intensity. It was the opinion of the P.I.L. representatives that the objects sighted were not birds, balloons or aircraft, were "not reflections because there was no blinking while passing through 60 degrees of arc" and were, therefore, "self-luminous." Plots of motion and variation in light intensity of the objects were displayed. While the Panel Members were impressed by the evident enthusiasm, industry and extent of effort of the P.I.L. team, they could not accept the conclusions reached. Some of the reasons for this were as follows:

a. A semi-spherical object can readily produce a reflection of sunlight without "blinking" through 60" of arc travel.

b. Although no data was available on the "albedo" of birds or polyethylene balloons in bright sunlight, the apparent motions, sizes and brightnesses of the objects were considered strongly to suggest birds, particularly after the Panel viewed a short film showing high reflectivity of seagulls in bright sunlight.

c. P.I.L. description of the objects sighted as "circular, bluish-white" in color would be expected in cases of specular reflections of sunlight from convex surfaces where the brilliance of the reflection would obscure other portions of the object.

d. Objects in the Great Falls case were believed to have probably been aircraft, and the bright lights such reflections.

e. There was no valid reason for the attempt to relate the objects in the Tremonton sighting to those in the Great Falls sighting. This may have been due to misunderstanding in their directive. The objects in the Great Falls sighting are strongly suspected of being reflections of aircraft known to have been in the area.

f. The intensity change in the Tremonton lights was too great for acceptance of the P.I.L. hypothesis that the apparent motion and changing intensity of the lights indicated extremely high speed in small orbital paths.

g. Apparent lack of guidance of investigators by those familiar with U.F.O. reports and explanations.

h. Analysis of light intensity of objects made from duplicate rather than original film. The original film was noted to have a much lighter background (affecting relative brightness of object) and the objects appeared much less bright.

i. Method of obtaining data of light intensity appeared faulty because of unsuitability of equipment and questionable assumptions in making averages of readings.

j. No data had been obtained on the sensitivity of Kodachrome film to light of various intensities using the same camera type at the same lens openings.

k. Hand "jitter" frequencies (obtainable from early part of Tremonton film) were not removed from the plots of the "single pass plots" at the end of the film.

The Panel believed strongly that the data available on this sighting was sufficient for positive identification if further data is obtained by photographing polyethylene "pillow" balloons released near the site under similar weather conditions, checking bird flight and reflection characteristics with competent ornithologists and calculating apparent "G" forces acting upon objects from their apparent tracks. It was concluded that the results of such tests would probably lead to creditable explanations of value in an educational or training program."

Whilst concluding there was nothing of scientific value in UFO reports and that there was no evidence of a direct threat to national security, the panel noted:

"The Panel Members were in agreement with O/SI opinion that, although evidence of any direct threat from these sightings was wholly lacking, related dangers might well exist resulting from:

a. Misidentification of actual enemy artifacts by defense personnel.

b. Overloading of emergency reporting channels with "false" information ("noise to signal ratio" analogy—Berkner).

c. Subjectivity of public to mass hysteria and greater vulnerability to possible enemy psychological warfare. "

In addition to a range of suggestions regarding improved techniques and resources for Blue Book the Panel concluded that a public education campaign should be undertaken to, on the one hand, improve training for relevant personnel in identification of various aerial phenomena and:

"(t)he "debunking" aim would result in reduction in public interest in "flying saucers" which today evokes a strong psychological reaction. This education could be accomplished by mass media such as television, motion pictures, and popular articles. Basis of such education would be actual case histories which had been puzzling at first but later explained. As in the case of conjuring tricks, there is much less stimulation if the "secret" is known. Such a program should tend to reduce the current gullibility of the public and consequently their susceptibility to clever hostile propaganda. The Panel noted that the general absence of Russian propaganda based on a subject with so many obvious possibilities for exploitation might indicate a possible Russian official policy. ... The Panel took cognizance of the existence of such groups as the "Civilian Flying Saucer Investigators" (Los Angeles) and the "Aerial Phenomena Research Organization (Wisconsin). It was believed that such organizations should be watched because of their potentially great influence on mass thinking if widespread sightings should occur. The apparent irresponsibility and the possible use of such groups for subversive purposes should be kept in mind."

=== Recommendations of the Robertson Panel ===
The formal recommendations of the panel focused mainly on the educational or "debunking" aspects of their conclusions:

" 1. Pursuant to the request of the Assistant Director for Scientific Intelligence, the undersigned Panel of Scientific Consultants has met to evaluate any possible threat to national security posed by Unidentified Flying Objects ("Flying Saucers"), and to make recommendations thereon. The Panel has received the evidence as presented by cognizant intelligence agencies, primarily the Air Technical Intelligence Center, and has reviewed a selection of the best documented incidents.

2. As a result of its considerations, the Panel _concludes_:

a. That the evidence presented on Unidentified Flying Objects shows no indication that these phenomena constitute a direct physical threat to national security.

We firmly believe that there is no residuum of cases which indicates Phenomena which are attributable to foreign artifacts capable of hostile acts, and that there is no evidence that the phenomena indicates a need for the revision of current scientific concepts.

3.The Panel further _concludes_:

a. That the continued emphasis on the reporting of these phenomena does, in these parlous times, result in a threat to the orderly functioning of the protective organs of the body politic.

We cite as examples the clogging of channels of communication by irrelevant reports, the danger of being led by continued false alarms to ignore real indications of hostile action, and the cultivation of a morbid national psychology in which skilful hostile propaganda could induce hysterical behavior and harmful distrust of duty constituted authority.

4. In order most effectively to strengthen the national facilities for the timely recognition and the appropriate handling of true indications of hostile action, and to minimize the concomitant dangers alluded to above, the Panel recommends:

a. That the national security agencies take immediate steps to strip the Unidentified Flying Objects of the special status they have been given and the aura of mystery they have unfortunately acquired;

b. That the national security agencies institute policies on intelligence, training, and public education designed to prepare the material defenses and the morale of the country to recognize most promptly and to react most effectively to true indications of hostile intent or action.

We suggest that these aims may be achieved by an integrated program designed to reassure the public of the total lack of evidence of Inimical forces behind the phenomenon, to train personnel to recognize and reject false indications quickly and effectively, and to strengthen regular channels for the evaluation of and prompt reaction to true indications of hostile measures."

== Aftermath ==
Historian Gerald Haines notes that:

"Following the Robertson panel findings, the Agency abandoned efforts to draft an NSCID on UFOs. The Scientific Advisory Panel on UFOs (the Robertson panel) submitted its report to the IAC, the Secretary of Defense, the Director of the Federal Civil Defense Administration, and the Chairman of the National Security Resources Board. CIA officials said no further consideration of the subject appeared warranted, although they continued to monitor sightings in the interest of national security. Philip Strong and Fred Durant from OSI also briefed the Office of National Estimates on the findings. CIA officials wanted knowledge of any Agency interest in the subject of flying saucers carefully restricted, noting not only that the Robertson panel report was classified but also that any mention of CIA sponsorship of the panel was forbidden ...".

In the years following the Robertson Panel a series of special military regulations were introduced to regulate reporting of UFO sightings. These were Joint-Army-Navy-Air Force Publication 147 (JANAP 146) of December 1953 and a 1954 revision of Air Force Regulation 200-2 (AFR 200–2) which introduced significant penalties on military, and some civilian personnel, for unauthorized release of information relating to UFO sightings.

Ruppelt's 1956 book The Report On Unidentified Flying Objects contained the first publicly released information about the Robertson Panel, with a summary of their proceedings and conclusions. Ruppelt's book did not include the names of the Panel members, nor any institutional or governmental affiliations.

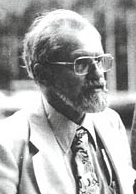
Robertson Panel consultant J. Allen Hynek

In 1958, the National Investigations Committee on Aerial Phenomena (NICAP), a civilian UFO research group, requested that the Air Force release the panel's report. The Air Force released three summary paragraphs and the names of the panel's members. In 1966 a nearly full-length version of the report was printed in the science column of the Saturday Review.

Hynek's opinions changed in later years, so much that he became, to ufologists, the scientifically respectable voice of Ufology. He would write that the Robertson Panel had "made the subject of UFOs scientifically unrespectable, and for nearly 20 years not enough attention was paid to the subject to acquire the kind of data needed even to decide the nature of the UFO phenomenon."

According to Swords, the Robertson Panel's report had a significant impact throughout the U.S. Government, significantly reducing the level of concern over the UFO phenomena within the military and intelligence communities that had developed during 1952.

=== Criticism of the Robertson Panel's conclusions ===
A number of criticisms have been leveled at the Robertson panel by ufologists. In particular that the panel's study of the phenomena was relatively perfunctory and its conclusions largely predetermined by the earlier CIA review of the UFO situation.

== See also ==
- Project Blue Book
- Advanced Aviation Threat Identification Program
- Majestic 12
