= Jimmy Carter rabbit incident =

Swamp rabbit attack on U.S. president

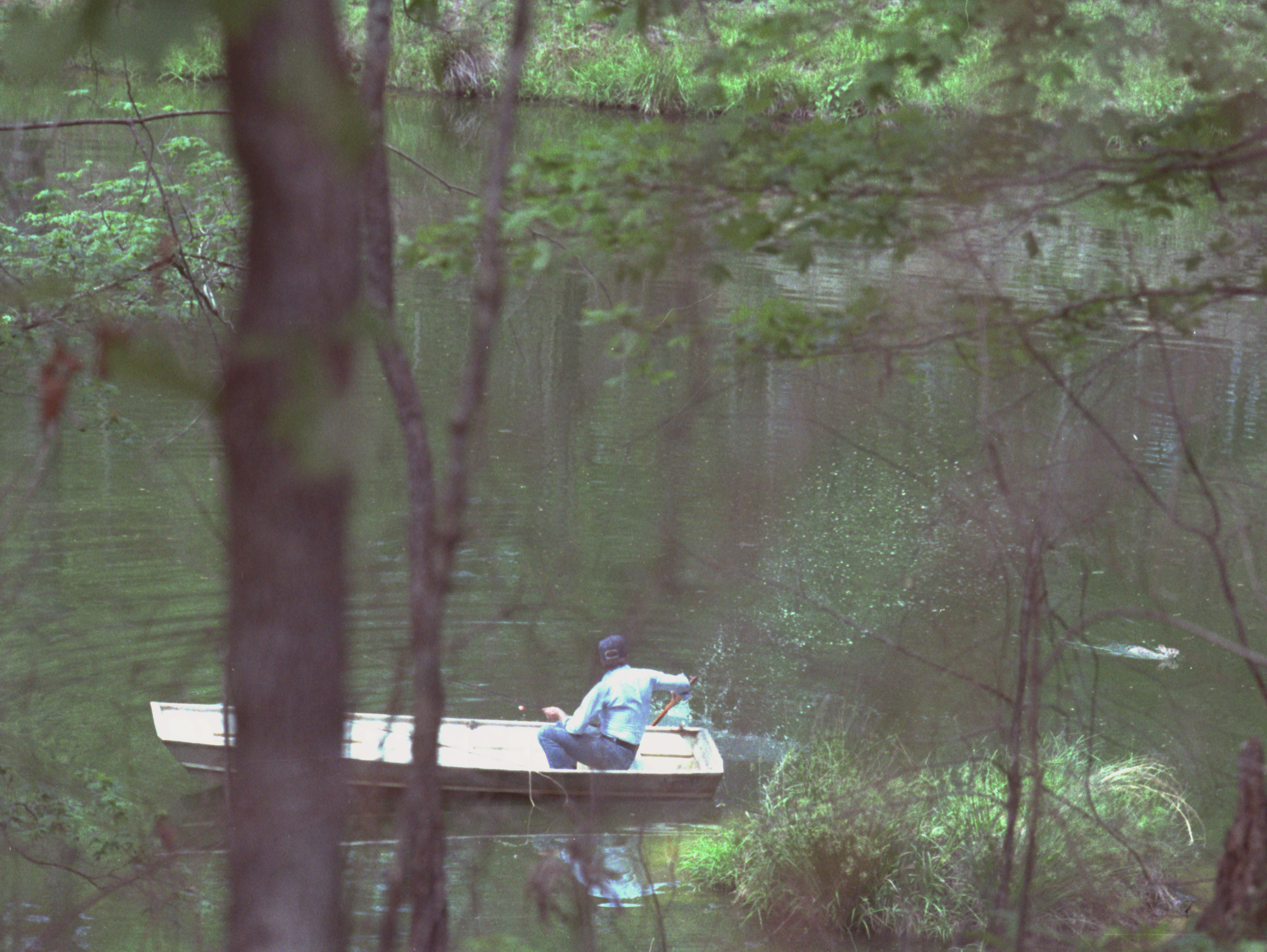
April 20, 1979, White House photo of Carter and the rabbit from the Carter Library

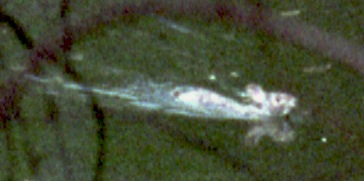
Close-up of the rabbit cropped from the White House photo

The Jimmy Carter rabbit incident, sensationalized as the "killer rabbit attack" by the press, involved a swamp rabbit (Sylvilagus aquaticus) that aggressively swam toward U.S. president Jimmy Carter's fishing boat on April 20, 1979. The incident caught the imagination of the media after Associated Press White House correspondent Brooks Jackson learned of the story months later.

== Event ==
On April 20, 1979, during a few days of vacation in his hometown of Plains, Georgia, Carter was fishing in a johnboat (sometimes erroneously described as a canoe) in a pond on his farm, when he saw a swamp rabbit, which Carter later speculated was fleeing from a predator, swimming in the water and making its way towards him, "hissing menacingly, its teeth flashing and nostrils flared", so he reacted by either hitting or splashing water at it with his paddle to scare it away, and it subsequently swam away from him and climbed out of the pond. A White House photographer captured the subsequent scene. Carter was uninjured; the fate of the rabbit is unknown.

On August 30, Carter told reporters that it "was just a nice, quiet, typical Georgia rabbit." University of Maryland zoologist Vagn Flyger rejected the idea of the rabbit attacking Carter, saying that, "If anything, he was probably scared and trying to find a dry place to get to."

== White House staff reaction ==
In the spring of 1979, soon after returning from Plains, Jimmy Carter was making small talk with various White House staff, including his press secretary Jody Powell, while sitting on the Truman Balcony, when he mentioned the story. His staff were skeptical about the actions of the rabbit, so he showed them a print of the photograph, which clearly showed him and the boat, but the rabbit was too small to identify, so he got a larger version, which convinced them.

== Media reception of story ==
According to Powell, in the subsequent August, Powell was chatting with Associated Press White House correspondent Brooks Jackson – according to Powell's memory, over a cup of tea, but according to Carter, "in a bar after a lot of drinking had gone on" – and mentioned the story. The next day, Jackson reported it to the news.

According to Jackson, he heard it while on a trip with the president on a Mississippi paddle wheeler, and wrote it up a week later.

The story had an embargo of a couple of days, but radio stations, such as those that carried Paul Harvey's programs, started talking about it shortly after it was submitted, so newspapers successfully requested that the embargo be lifted. (Their eagerness to publish the story may have been a result of a dearth of other news.) As a result, on August 30 the story got a front-page article in The Washington Post under the title "Bunny Goes Bugs: Rabbit Attacks President", illustrated with a parody of the Jaws movie poster, entitled "PAWS", and a New York Times article titled "A Tale of Carter and the 'Killer Rabbit'". News coverage of the incident continued for more than a week.

== Media reception of photograph ==
No news photographers were allowed to be close enough to take photographs, and the Carter administration refused to share the photograph. Deputy press secretary Rex Granum said that "There are just certain stories about the president that must forever remain shrouded in mystery." Powell stated, "We're afraid if we release the photo, the rabbit controversy over the next two weeks will receive more ink than the SALT treaty." News cartoonists instead drew their own illustrations, exaggerating the story.

Near the beginning of their time in the White House, the Reagan administration came across a copy of the picture, and released it to the press, thereby reigniting media coverage.

Jerry Callen obtained a digital copy of the photograph from the Jimmy Carter Library, and released it on his blog, Narsil.org.

== Cultural impact ==
The media used the event as a metaphor to negatively portray Carter. In the subsequent elections, Carter lost to Ronald Reagan, and Republicans won a majority in the Senate, which they had not had since 1954.

The Onion, a satirical newspaper, published the headline "48-Year-Old Rabbit Finally Finishes The Job" to commemorate Carter after his death on December 29, 2024.

== See also ==
- Jimmy Carter UFO incident
- Presidency of Jimmy Carter
- Rabbit of Caerbannog
