= Jerome Clark =

American writer

- Born: November 27, 1946 (age 79); Canby, Minnesota
- Education: Moorhead State College
- Occupation: Writer

Jerome Clark (born November 27, 1946) is an American writer, specializing in unidentified flying objects and other paranormal subjects. He has appeared on ABC News Special Report, Unsolved Mysteries, Sightings, and the A&E Network discussing UFOs and other oddities. Clark is also a country and folk music songwriter.

== Biography ==
Clark was born on November 27, 1946 and raised in Canby, Minnesota, attending South Dakota State University and Moorhead State College. He has served as a writer, reporter, and editor for a number of magazines which cover UFOs and other paranormal subjects. He has been an editor of Fate magazine and International UFO Reporter. He also studied the UFO religion Heaven's Gate prior to their 1997 mass suicide.

Clark authored the multi-volume The UFO Encyclopedia: The Phenomenon From The Beginning with its first edition published in 1992. Library Journal stated in its review of The UFO Encyclopedia that "A respected UFO authority provides a much-needed update of the [UFO] field with this new encyclopedia ... [it] is the most thorough treatment yet of this puzzling phenomenon ... the [encyclopedia] should be considered by larger public and academic libraries." Choice: Current Reviews for Academic Libraries wrote that "the articles are factual and balanced, with neither a believer's nor a skeptic's viewpoint predominating", and that The UFO Encyclopedia is "recommended for public libraries and undergraduate collections".

In 1997, an abridged, one-volume edition of The UFO Encyclopedia, entitled The UFO Book: Encyclopedia of the Extraterrestrial, was published as a trade paperback. In 1998, The UFO Book won the Benjamin Franklin Award in the Science/Environment category sponsored by the Independent Book Publishers Association.

In its review of his 1999 book Cryptozoology A to Z, Salon commented that Clark and co-author Loren Coleman "show a touchingly supportive nature" for a subject often criticized for lack of scientific rigor. Sunday Express combined its review of Clark's 2000 book Extraordinary Encounters, An Encyclopedia of Extraterrestrials and Otherworldly Beings with another similar book entitled UFOs and Popular Culture by James R. Lewis, calling both books "inexplicably entertaining" and commenting that they "manage throughout to maintain a healthy rationality and openmindedness, neither over-sceptical nor too ready to believe the claims of the UFOmongers." According to skeptical academic Paul Kurtz, "Clark attacks skeptics for being closed-minded and dogmatic, yet he is easily impressed by questionable evidence."

== Songwriting and music reviews ==
Clark is also a country and folk music songwriter. Clark has written songs which have been recorded or performed by musicians such as Emmylou Harris, Mary Chapin Carpenter, and Tom T. Hall and has collaborated with Robin and Linda Williams. He has also written a number of reviews of American folk music albums and CDs for Rambles magazine.

== Works ==
- The Unidentified: Notes Toward Solving the UFO Mystery by Jerome Clark and Loren Coleman. Warner Paperback Library, 1975. ISBN 0-446-78735-3
- Earths Secret Inhabitants by D Scott Rogo and Jerome Clark. Tempo Books, 1979. ISBN 0-448-17062-0
- Encyclopedia of Strange and Unexplained Physical Phenomena, 1993, Thomson Gale Press, ISBN 0-8103-8843-X
- The UFO Book: Encyclopedia of the Extraterrestrial, 1997, Visible Ink Press, ISBN 1-57859-029-9
- Strange and Unexplained Phenomena. New York: Visible Ink Press (1997). ISBN 978-0787627645.
- The UFO Encyclopedia: The Phenomenon From The Beginning (2-Volume Set), 1998, Omnigraphics Books, ISBN 0-7808-0097-4
- Cryptozoology A to Z: The Encyclopedia of Loch Monsters, Sasquatch, Chupacabras, and Other Authentic Mysteries of Nature, with Loren Coleman. Simon and Schuster, 1999. ISBN 0684856026
- Extraordinary Encounters: an Encyclopedia of Extraterrestrials and Otherworldly Beings, 2000, ABC-CLIO. ISBN 1-57607-379-3
- Strange Skies: Pilot Encounters with UFOs, 2003, Citadel Books, ISBN 0-8065-2299-2
- Unnatural Phenomena: A Guide to the Bizarre Wonders of North America, 2005, ABC-Clio Books, ISBN 1-57607-430-7
- The Unidentified & Creatures of the Outer Edge, with Loren Coleman. Anomalist Books, 2006. ISBN 1933665114
- Hidden Realms, Lost Civilizations, and Beings from Other Worlds, 2010, Visible Ink Press, ISBN 1-57859-175-9
- Unexplained: Strange Sightings, Incredible Occurrences, and Puzzling Physical Phenomena, 3rd ed. 2012, Visible Ink Press, ISBN 1-57859-344-1
- Strange & Unexplained Happenings: When Nature Breaks the Rules of Science, with Nancy Pear. UXL Publishing. ISBN 0-8103-9780-3
