= UFO hypotheses =

Proposed explanations for UFOs

"The Trickster" by Chris Butler was commissioned as cover art for the 2014 edition of the book Passport to Magonia: from Folklore to Flying Saucers. It depicts a Gray alien holding three masks: one angelic, one demonic, and one extra-terrestrial.

Unidentified flying objects (UFOs), lately rebranded as Unidentified Aerial Phenomena (UAPs), have been in the popular imagination since at least the 1940s, with a wide range of explanations for the reported observations. A person or group will typically argue in favor of one or more UFO hypotheses as a way to explain UFO reports. Mainstream explanations of these reports have attributed most of them to people failing to identify or misidentifying ordinary objects and phenomena. Some believe such ordinary explanations are inadequate to explain all the UFO reports, beliefs that skeptics identify with delusional or muddled thinking. Fringe claims that UFOs are caused by intelligent beings, perhaps from outer space, an inner Earth, another dimension, or the future are popularly shared by proponents of the ideas with help from sensationalizing media. Even as explicit UFO religions exist, there are also broader religious-based claims that UFOs are angelic, demonic, or related to death.

== Antecedents ==
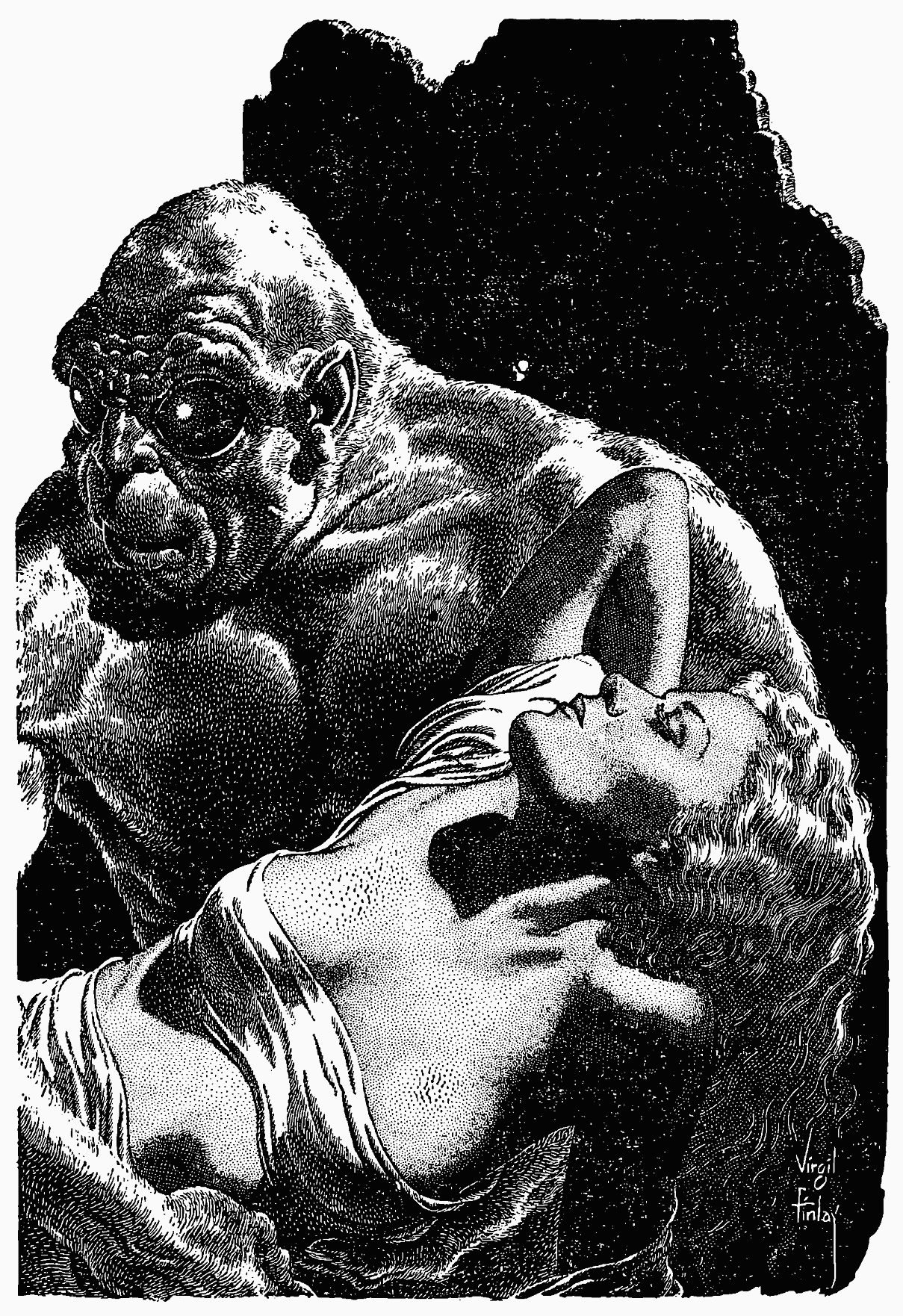
A cannablistic underground-dweller ("Morlock") carries a captive blonde-haired, blue-eyed surface-dweller ("Eloi") in an illustration of H.G. Well's The Time Machine. Angelic aryans (or nordics), murderous underground monsters, and time travellers would each be invoked as a possible cause of UFO reports.

Scholars of folklore note that many 20th-century explanations for UFOs have antecedents in late 19th-century culture.

Theosophy is a spiritualism-inspired New Age religious tradition founded in 1875 by Russian-American mystic Helena Blavatsky. Blavatsky and her successors described "highly-evolved" superhumans, variously called Ascended Masters, Hyperboreans, Lemurians, Atlanteans, and Aryans. Theosophy held these beings lived in any number of exotic locations, including lost continents, inside a hollow Earth, on other planets, or in a spiritual realm called the Etheric Plane.

In his 1895 novella The Time Machine, H.G. Wells wrote of the Morlocks, a hidden, subterranean race of technological humanoids who feed on helpless surface-dwellers. The 1933 novel Lost Horizon and its 1937 film adaptation depict Shangri-La, a Tibetan paradise inhabited by peaceful, angelic, nearly-immortal people. The 1935 serial The Phantom Empire starred Gene Autry as a singing cowboy who stumbles upon an ancient subterranean civilization living beneath his own ranch.

In the 1940s, when speculation about UFOs first entered mainstream culture, a number of explanations drew upon theosophical or science-fiction concepts. George Adamski reported contact with Nordic aliens or "Space Brothers" who, like Theosophy's higher beings, were benevolent, telepathic, and "Aryan" in appearance. Another theosophist, Meade Layne, argued UFOs were not "space ships" from outerspace but actually "ether ships" from the Etheric Plane – an alleged spiritual realm described in Theosophy teachings. Still others, including Richard Sharpe Shaver, argued the UFOs came from a hidden terrestrial world: Atlantis, Lemuria, an ocean base, or the inside of a hollow Earth.

== Psychological factors ==
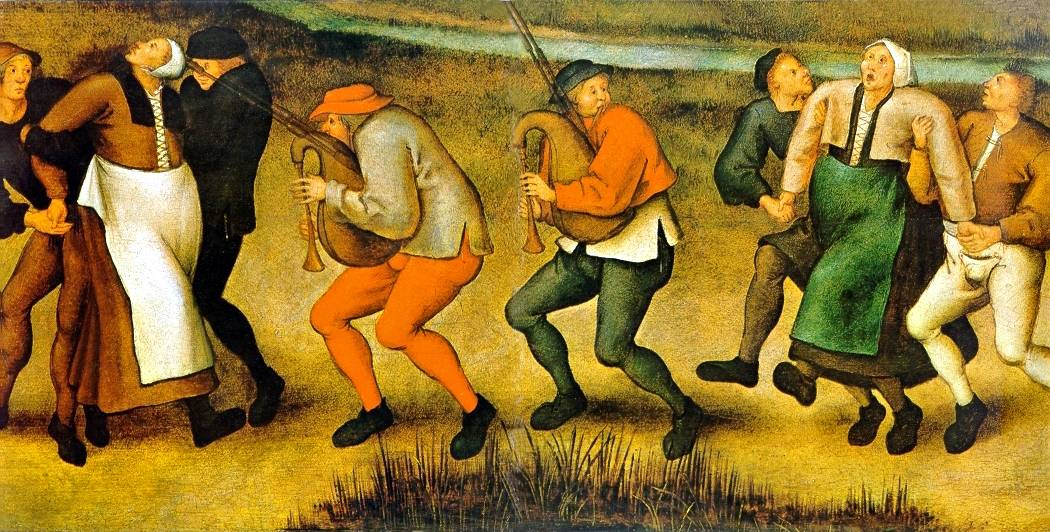
Dancing plagues of the Middle Ages are thought to have been caused by mass hysteria.

During the 1947 flying disc craze, experts in human behavior argued the reports were best explained as a psychological or social phenomenon. The flying disc craze was compared to Scotland's Loch Ness monster, the panic caused by the Orson Welles broadcast of War of the Worlds, and a sea monster panic caused by a US Armed Forces Radio hoax in Japan. Winfred Overholser, nationally renowned psychiatrist, described the reports as a "national hysteria".

In the 1970s and 80s, people began reporting recovered memories of alien abductions. Most scientists and mental health professionals explain these experiences by factors such as suggestibility (e.g. false memory syndrome), sleep paralysis, deception, and psychopathology.

Psychological factors remain the mainstream explanation for otherwise-inexplicable UFO reports. Several UFO proponents have been reported to suffer from severe mental illness, including Richard Shaver and Philip Schneider.

== Alien visitors ==
While most fringe theories of UFOs link them to existence of intelligent 'others' from 'elsewhere', there is considerable diversity of speculation as to the origin and nature of said beings. "Disclosure" advocate Luis Elizondo, for example, said that UFOs "could be something from outer space, inner space or, frankly, the space in between."

=== Extraterrestrial spaceships ===
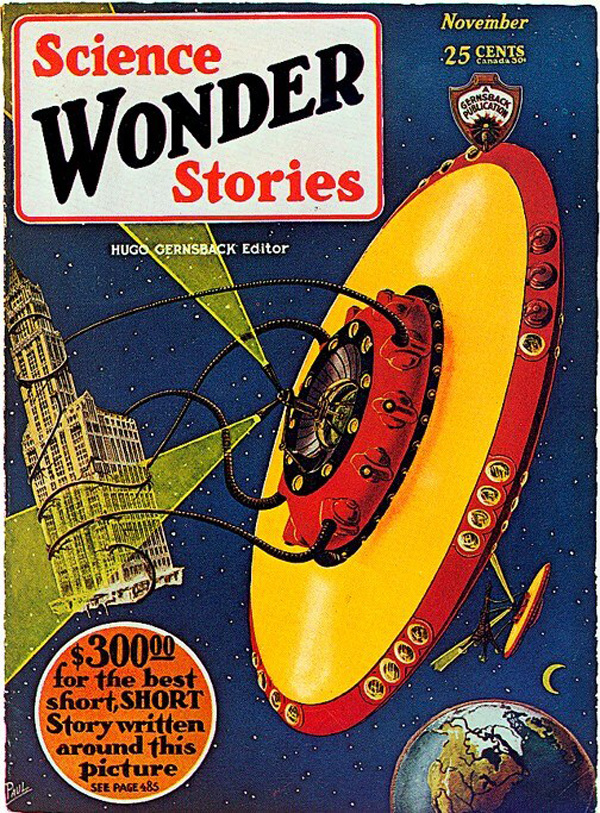
A "flying saucer" on the cover of a 1929 issue of Science Wonder Stories

In the 20th century, a variety of exogenous voices argued that UFO reports were often best explained as being physical spacecraft occupied by intelligent alien beings from other planets, or probes designed by extraterrestrials. For much of the 20th century, extraterrestrials were the go-to or default explanation among UFOlogists, which in turn led skeptics to label the entire discourse as pseudoscientific.

On July 7, 1947, original saucer witness Kenneth Arnold raised the topic of possible extraterrestrial origins, both as his opinion and those who had written to him. Some, he said, "suggested the discs were visitations from another planet." By 1949, Donald Keyhoe, a former Major in the US Marines, claimed that elements within the Air Force knew that saucers existed and had concluded they were likely 'inter-planetary'. In 1952, Life Magazine published "Have We Visitors From Space?" which popularized the Extraterrestrial Hypothesis and is thought to have triggered the 1952 UFO flap.

While remaining a popular explanation for UFOs up through today, even some of those who believed in sentient alien life began to question the extra-terrestrial spaceship hypothesis by the 1970s. While 1940 and 50s people frequently speculated about life on other planets, by the 1970s, probes to the Moon, Mars, and Venus confirmed those worlds were uninhabited and inhospitable to life as we know it. While 1940s audiences suggested UFOs might contain explorers from another world doing a planetary survey, by the 1970s, ufologists like J. Allen Hynek and Jacques Vallée argued the number of UFO sightings were "far more numerous than required for any physical survey of the earth", an argument strengthened by the insight that stories similar to UFO reports existed long before 1947. The reports of alien abductions were not consistent with rational, scientifically-minded biological experiments of the kind extra-terrestrial explorers might conduct. while the mainstream experts who bothered to comment on such claims would point out that humanoid aliens evolving independently on another planet "beggared belief."

=== Inner-Earth inhabitants ===
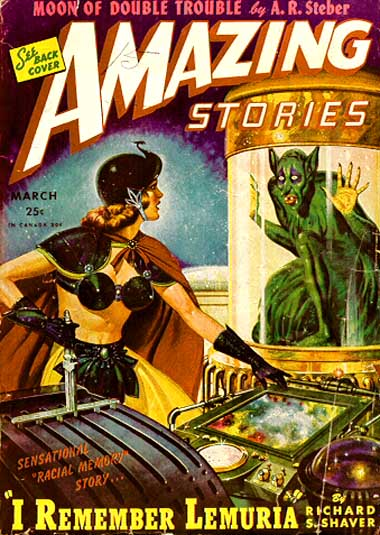
Shaver's first published work, the novella "I Remember Lemuria", was the cover story in the March 1945 Amazing Stories.

During the mid-1940s, an obscure subculture developed around the science fiction magazine Amazing Stories and its tales of Richard Sharpe Shaver, which were presented as a non-fictional account from "a simple man, a worker in metal, employed in a steel mill in Pennsylvania". Since 1945, the magazine had published Shaver's claims that he was in communication with subterranean beings concerned about atomic pollution who piloted disc-shaped craft.

In the October 1947 issue of Amazing Stories, editor Raymond Palmer argued the flying disc flap was proof of Richard Sharpe Shaver's claims. That same issue carried a letter from Shaver in which he argued the truth behind the discs would remain a secret. Shaver wrote:

The discs can be a space invasion, a secret new army plane – or a scouting trip by an enemy country…OR, they can be Shaver's space ships, taking off and landing regularly on earth for centuries past, and seen today as they have always been – as a mystery. They could be leaving earth with cargos of wonder-mech that to us would mean emancipation from a great many of our worst troubles— and we'll never see those cargos…I predict that nothing more will be seen, and the truth of what the strange disc ships really are will never be disclosed to the common people. We just don't count to the people who do know about such things. It isn't necessary to tell us anything.

After Shaver's death in 1975, his editor Raymond Palmer admitted that "Shaver had spent eight years not in the Cavern World, but in a mental institution" being treated for paranoid schizophrenia.

In his 1956 book They Knew Too Much About Flying Saucers, author Gray Barker suggested the saucers might come from an inner Earth, a connection also explored by Albert K. Bender in his 1962 book Flying Saucers and the Three Men. In the 1980s, Rick Doty and John Lear spread stories of malevolent aliens in underground bases who were responsible for cattle mutilation and alien abduction. Their claims were echoed by their associates Bill Cooper, Bob Lazar, and Philip Schneider.

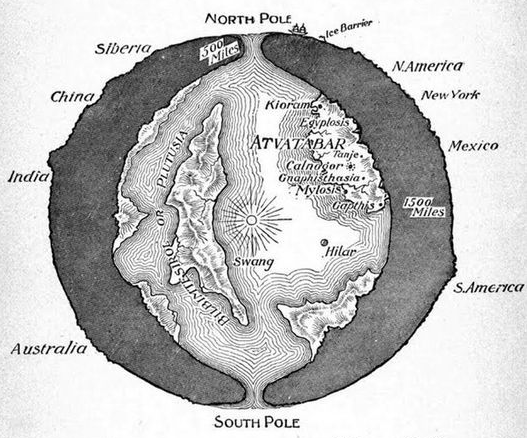
A cross-sectional drawing of a Hollow Earth

In the 2000s, author Mac Tonnies coined the term "crypto-terrestrial" to describe theoretical, hidden, indigenous humanoids. Tonnies compared his "Crypto-terrestrial Hypothesis" with what he termed the Null Hypothesis of UFOs, the idea that "UFOs can be universally ascribed to misidentified natural phenomena and sightings of unconventional earthly aircraft". Aaron John Gulyas, a scholar of conspiracy theories, characterized Tonnies's hypothesis as "really more of a thought experiment designed to raise questions", while others note that "even people open to the cryptoterrestrial hypothesis remain skeptical".

=== Interdimensional beings ===
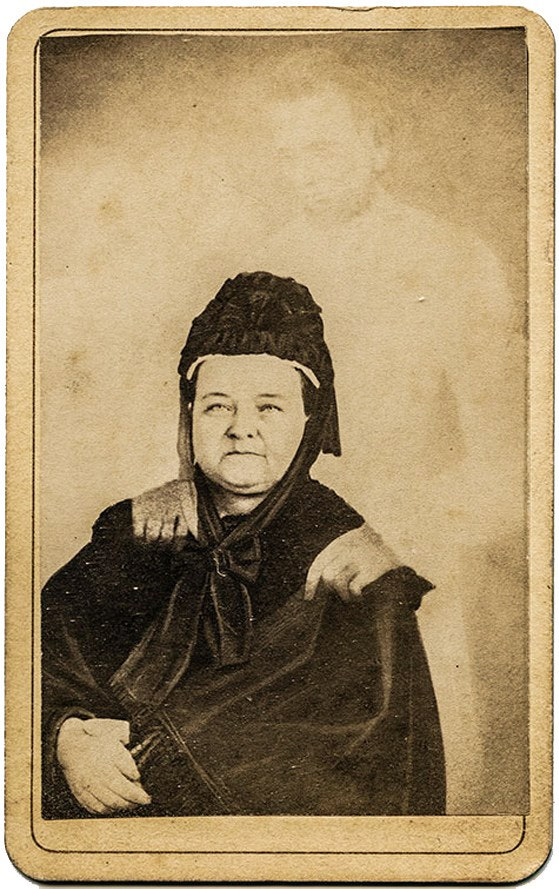
Spiritualists held UFOs might come from a "spiritual plane"

Others like UFO advocate Luis Elizondo reject a "woo-woo" interpretation of multiple dimensions, instead invoking their own pseudoscientific ideas relating to a "fourth dimension", illustrated by an animation of a 4-dimensional cube.

On October 14, 1946, nearly a year before Kenneth Arnold's sighting that coined the term "flying saucers", occultist Meade Layne achieved national notoriety when the wire service carried a story on his claims of a medium who was in telepathic communication with people in a space ship. Layne claimed UFOs came from the Etheric plane, a spiritual realm taken from Theosophy.

By the late 1960s, interdimensional claims were gaining in popularity. In his 'landmark' 1969 book Passport to Magonia, Vallée argues for a "parallel universe co-existing with our own". The idea was reiterated in Vallée's subsequent writings. In 1970, author John Keel coined the term "ultraterrestrials" to describe non-human entities linked to UFOs "which exist in a wavelength of energy which we cannot detect". In 1975's The Edge of Reality, J. Allen Hynek considered the possibility of what he called "interlocking universes":

HYNEK: There could be other universe with different quantum rules or vibration rates if you want. Our own space-time continuum could be a cross-section through a universe with many more dimensions. ... Think what a hard time you would have convincing an aborigine that right now, through this room, TV pictures are passing! Yet they're here. You have to have a transducer to see them -- namely a TV set. Well, in the same sense there may be interlocking universes right here! We have this idea of space, we always think of another universe being someplace else. It may not. Maybe it's right here."

The 2008 action-adventure film Indiana Jones and the Kingdom of the Crystal Skull utilizes the interdimensional hypothesis and describes ancient aliens not flying into space but into ”the space between the spaces".

=== Time travelers ===
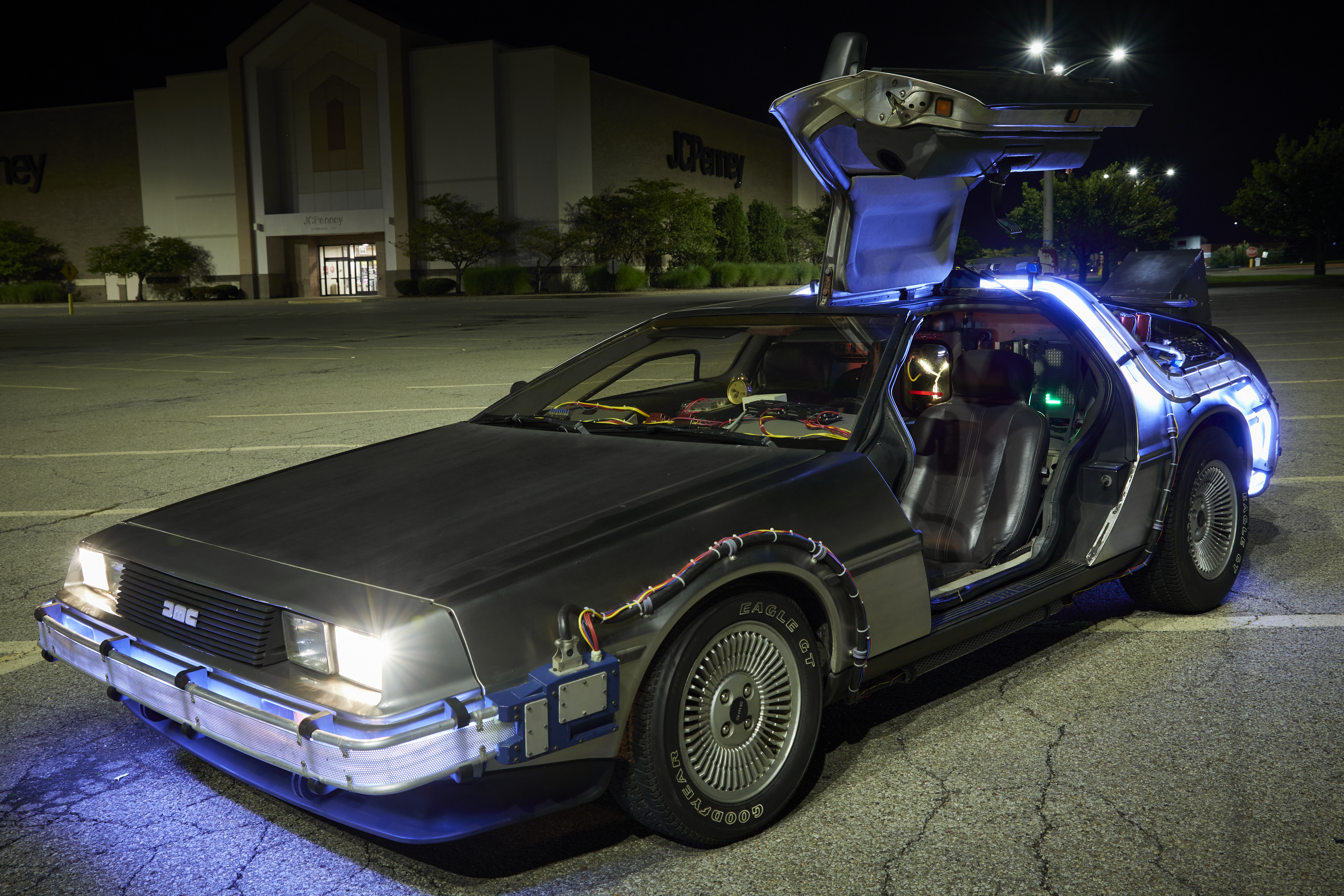
In the film Back to the Future, a time traveller in a Delorean is mistaken for an alien.

It has been suggested that UFO reports are caused by humans traveling from the future using advanced technology to somehow "travel backwards in time".

Due to the theoretical contradictions inherent to retrocausality regarding closed timelike curves, researcher Andrew Knight has labeled retrograde time travel as "pseudoscientific", and the time-traveler hypothesis itself has been challenged by skeptics. American astrophysicist Neil deGrasse Tyson has referred to the hypothesis as illogical.

== Novel form of life ==
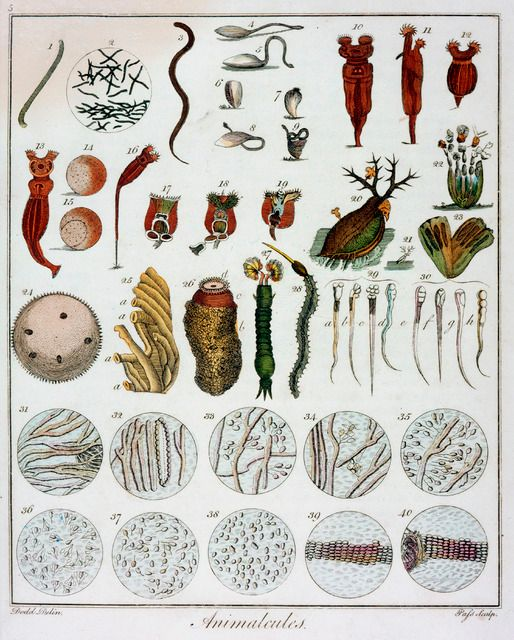
The 17th century invention of the microscope resulted in the discovery of "animalcules", a novel form of life known modernly as microbes. Trevor James Constable similarly argued that UFOs were in fact amoeba-like animals inhabiting the sky.

Multiple authors independently suggested that UFO reports might be caused by biological creatures native to space or Earth's atmosphere. In 1923, paranormal author Charles Fort mused, "It seems no more incredible that up in the seemingly unoccupied sky there should be hosts of living things than that the seeming blank of the ocean should swarm with life."

During the 1947 flying disc craze, a fan of Fort's writings named John Philip Bessor became the first modern proponent of the hypothesis when he authored a letter to the Air Force suggesting that discs might be "animals bearing very little likeness to human beings". In 1949, he wrote to the Saturday Evening Post to suggest that the discs might be "more like octopuses, in mentality, than humans".

In 1948, the Saturday Evening Post quoted Luis Walter Alvarez's opinion that the "gizmos" appeared to be "alive". In April 1949, the Air Force's Project Sign released an essay which considered the hypothesis, writing "the possible existence of some sort of strange extraterrestrial animals has been remotely considered, as many of the objects described acted more like animals than anything else".

By 1955, original saucer witness Kenneth Arnold began to promote the theory, suggesting that the UFOs are "sort of like sky jellyfish". Arnold added: "My theory might sound funny, but just remember that there are a lot of things in nature that we don’t know yet."

With terms like "sentient plasmoid" coming out of congressional records a hypothetical biochemistry that might lead to UFO reports is life-like dusty plasma. In 2007, Vadim N. Tsytovich and colleagues proposed that lifelike behaviors could be exhibited by dust particles suspended in a plasma, under conditions that might exist in space.

Jordan Peele's 2022 movie Nope featured a UFO that is revealed to be an animal.

== Angels, demons, and death ==
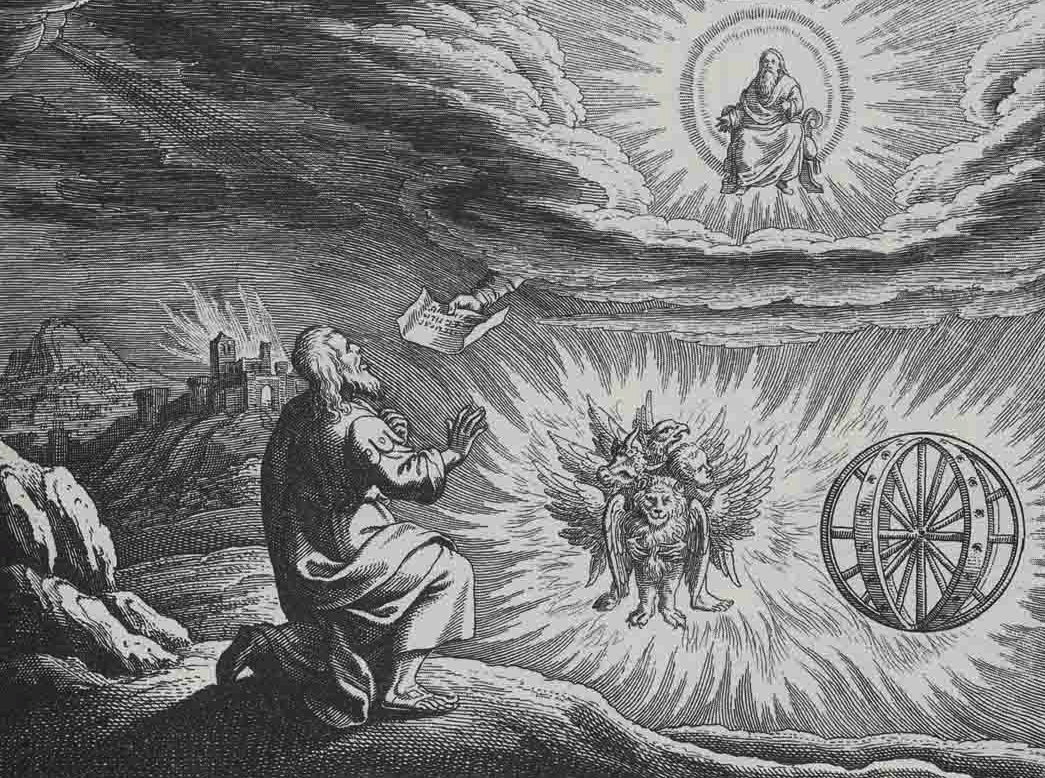
Engraving of Ezekiel's vision (1670)

A variety of religions have suggest UFOs are linked to God, his angels, or omni-benevolent beings. The biblical story of Ezekiel's Wheel is often likened to UFOs. UFOs play a role in a variety of new religious movements including Nation of Islam and Scientology.

Many have seen UFOs as demonic. In 1954, faith healer and evangelist Walter Vinson "W.V." Grant Sr published the booklet "Men in Flying Saucers Identified: Not a Mystery!" suggesting UFOs were demonic. In the end of the 1960s, British UFO author Gordon Creighton endorsed the theory. In 1974, Clifford Wilson authored UFOs and their Mission Impossible which popularized the demonic hypothesis.

Apocalyptic author Hal Lindsey wrote of demonic UFOs in The 1980s: Countdown to Armageddon. In 2010, British author Nick Redfern explored this concept in his book Final Events, subtitled "Demonic UFOs, Alien Abductions, the Government, and the Afterlife".

In the 2002 film Signs, a former Episcopal priest (Mel Gibson) who has lost his faith encounters malevolent beings that initially appear to be alien invaders but may in fact be demons. In 2026, Vice President of the United States JD Vance, speaking about UFOs, made the public claim that “I don’t think they’re aliens, I think they’re demons...."

Meanwhile, the thanatological hypothesis suggests reports of UFOs and associated entities may be linked to death, the dead, afterlife, and near-death experiences. Proponents, including Whitley Strieber (often with Jeffrey J. Kripal), and, more systematically, Joshua Cutchin, argue that recurring motifs in UFO reports—apparitional presences, liminality, soul-journey symbolism, and overlaps with near-death experiences (NDEs)—are better explained by a "death-adjacent" or survival-of-consciousness model. Thanatological interpretations of UFOs have generally remained marginal within both ufology and mainstream scholarship, with critics highlighting their speculative and unfalsifiable elements.

Religious scholar Jeffrey J. Kripal likens the various explanations for UFOs to the 2014 illustration "The Trickster" by Chris Butler. In the work, a 1970s-style "Grey alien" holds three masks: one mask is a 1930s-style "little green man" representing a classic extra-terrestrial, a second mask is an angelic blonde akin to the 1950s Nordic alien, known as Space Brothers or "Etherians". A third mask is a classic red devil with horns. The image was commissioned to be used as cover art for the 2014 reprint of Ufologist Jacques Vallee's classic work Passport to Magonia. Artist Chris Butler reported his validation when author Jacques Vallee opined the "best part of the re-release was probably the cover", which Vallee felt successfully illustrated the book's thesis.
