= Greada Treaty =

American conspiracy theory

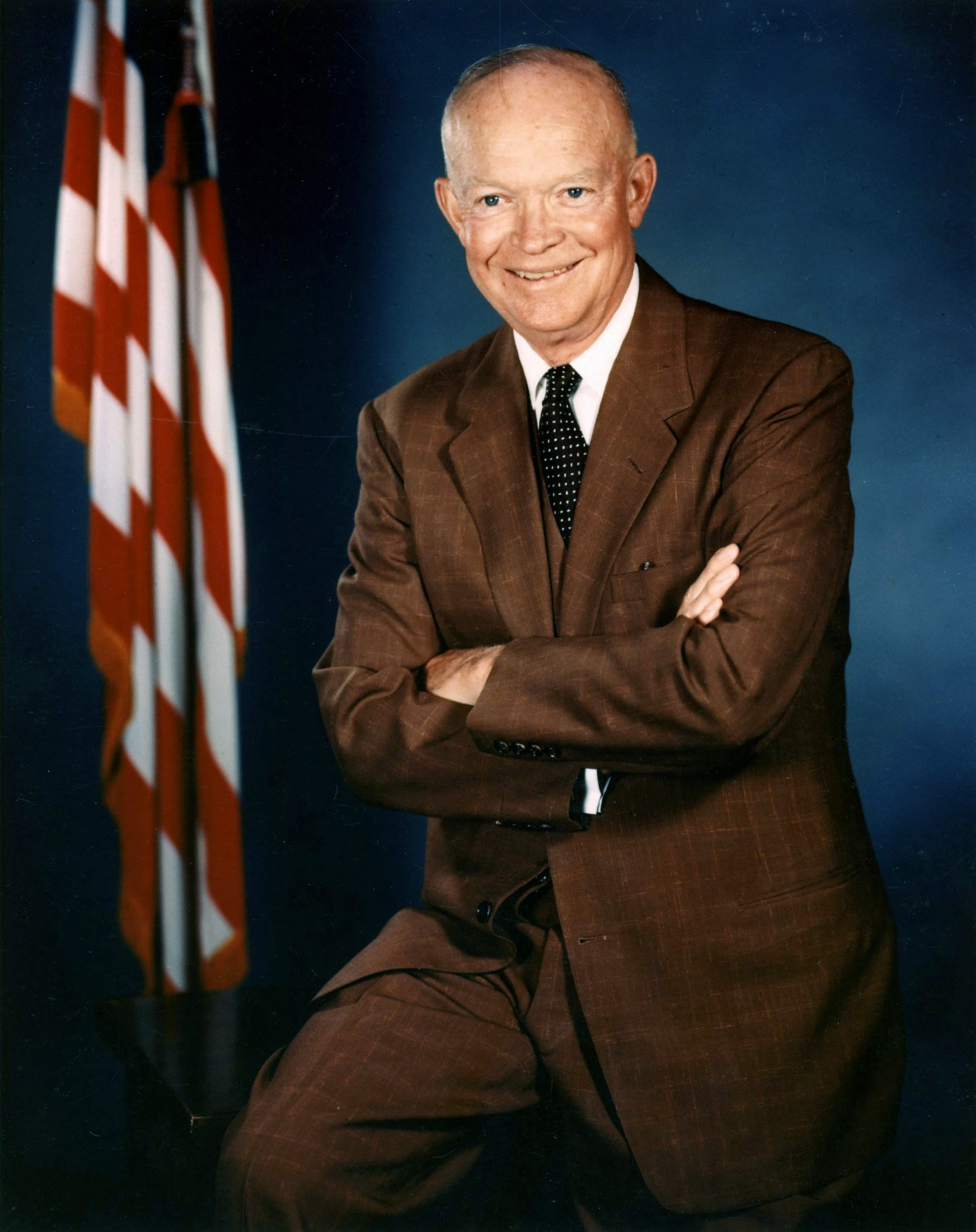
President Eisenhower (photographed in 1956) visited Palm Springs, California in 1954

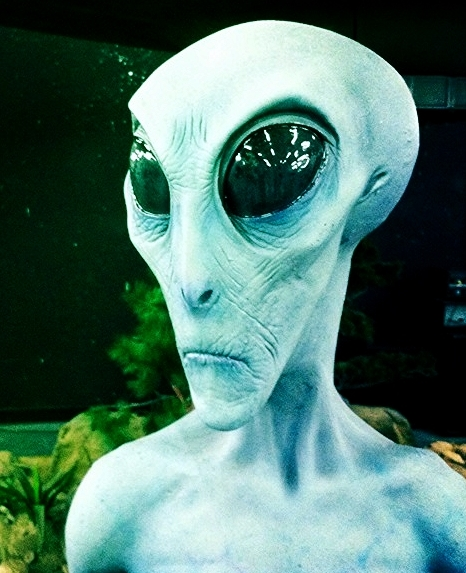
Depiction of a "Gray" alien. Grays, first described by Barney Hill, were associated with folklore of alien abductions and cattle mutilation

The Greada Treaty, in a conspiracy theory dating to the 1980s, is alleged to have been a secret agreement made between American President Dwight D. Eisenhower and malevolent Gray aliens in 1954.

From the early 1950s through the 1970s, legends circulated of benevolent extra-terrestrials landing at US bases. In the 1980s, these legends were adapted into a story about malevolent aliens collaborating with elements of the US government. The story originated with John Lear and was further propagated by his associates Rick Doty, Paul Bennewitz, Bill Cooper and Philip Schneider. Schneider's final lecture, in 1995, introduced the term "Greada" as the name of the Eisenhower–Gray Alien pact.

The supposed treaty inspired mainstream 1990s film and television like The X-Files and the 21st-century show American Horror Story: Double Feature.

== Antecedents in UFO landing stories ==
An "Etherian" space brother, described as Aryan or Nordic in appearance

External documents
- Letter from Gregory Light to Meade Layne (received April 16, 1954)
- Meade Layne's Personal Bulletin in response (April 16, 1954)

The 1980s "Greada Treaty" stories incorporated elements from earlier legends of UFO landings by peaceful, benevolent aliens.

In 1954, occultist Gerald Light authored a letter to "ethership" theorist Meade Layne in which he relayed a story of five "etherships" being inspected by President Eisenhower at Muroc, Edwards Air Force Base. Light argued the ships were there "with the assistance and permission of the Etherians" — Layne's term for Nordic aliens, the theosophy-inspired benevolent Space Brothers he'd spoken of since 1945. Meade Layne published the story in a bulletin to his newsletter subscribers.

By the 1970s, more stories of a summoned UFO landing were circulating, promoted by the supposedly-nonfiction film UFOs: Past, Present, and Future. The film's Holloman landing sequence has been noted for its similarities to the finale of the later Spielberg film Close Encounters of the Third Kind. The Gerald Light landing story was incorporated into the 1978 sci-fi novel Miracle Visitors by Ian Watson. A 1980s variant held that Eisenhower had traveled to Edwards to view alien bodies from the Roswell incident. According to one version of the legend, the benevolent aliens offered technology and enlightenment in exchange for the elimination of Earth's nuclear weapons, a deal Eisenhower declined.

Unlike the Greada Treaty theories, these early stories made no mention of a mutilation treaty, malevolent Grays, or traumatic abductions.

== Origin and spread by John Lear and associates ==
External documents
- Statement by John Lear (rev. August 25, 1988) hosted by the Internet Sacred Text Archive

In the 1980s, John Lear began speaking of alien collusion with secret governmental forces, and in the second half of the decade, Lear was "probably the most influential source" of UFO conspiracies. By way of contrast with prior UFO conspiracy theories about benevolent 'space brothers', author Jerome Clark named this new strain of thinking "ufology's dark side".

From 1987 to 1988, John Lear posted drafts of a statement to ParaNet, an early bulletin board system dedicated to the paranormal, claiming that the US government has close contacts with extraterrestrials. The document was revised on January 14, again in March, with a final revision dated August 25, 1988, describing a secret government committee, Majestic 12, making a treaty with Gray aliens, only to later realize they've been deceived by the aliens.

Lear's associate, Bill Cooper, in 1991 authored the influential conspiracy tract "Behold A Pale Horse" in which he asserted an Eisenhower–Alien treaty had been signed at Muroc/Edwards on February 20, 1954. According to Cooper's lore, Aliens were allowed to mutilate cattle and abduct specific humans. According to Cooper's narrative, it soon becomes clear the aliens are not abiding by the treaty, with some humans becoming victims of mutilations. Cooper theorizes that a historic late-night dental visit was actually cover for a trip to Muroc/Edwards.

In a series of 1995 lectures, John Lear's associate Philip Schneider talked of the Ike-Alien pact, naming it the "Greada Treaty". Schneider's proper noun "Greada" may have been a misspeak of the island nation of Grenada; a minority of transcripts interpolate Schneider's term as "Grenada treaty". Author Greg Valdez argues Schneider was directly influenced by Lear. Writes Valdez: "If you view the Phil Schneider story from a legal standard of preponderance of evidence or beyond a reasonable doubt, there is no evidence to support his story... Based on this lack of evidence and the cumulative issues about Phil, the Phil Schneider story... is not credible... especially in light of where these stories originated from: John Lear and the air force.... Phil also met with John Lear in Las Vegas, according to Lear’s interviews."

In 2004, both the Eisenhower Presidential Library and the former president's son John S. D. Eisenhower denied such a meeting had occurred. The theory was again discussed in 2018 after the creation of the US Space Force.

== In popular culture ==
In the 1992 film Sneakers, a conspiracy theorist played by actor Dan Aykroyd comedically espouses an early version of the theory, saying "the key meeting took place July 1, 1958, when the Air Force brought the space visitor to the White House for an interview with President Eisenhower. And Ike said, hey, look, give us your technology, and we'll give you all the cow lips you want." The line was drawn from contemporary conspiracy culture — Dan Aykroyd's brother Peter supplied conspiracy material on "UFOs, cattle mutilations, the Tri-Lateral Commission, the staged moon landing, JFK, [and] Marilyn Monroe" that was used to "spice up" his character.

Starting in 1993, hit TV show The X-Files adopted Bill Cooper's writings as the premise for its series. Over the course of several seasons, protagonists Mulder and Scully learn a secret elite group called "The Syndicate" has forged a treaty with alien colonists that allows abductions; in exchange, the Syndicate hope to receive preferential treatment after the colonization for themselves and their families.

In 2021, American Horror Story: Double Feature dramatized the treaty, casting Neal McDonough as Dwight D. Eisenhower, Sarah Paulson as first lady Mamie Eisenhower, and Cody Fern as the alien ambassador.
