= Milton William Cooper =

American conspiracy theorist (1943–2001)

- Born: May 6, 1943; Long Beach, California, U.S.
- Died: November 5, 2001 (aged 58); Eagar, Arizona, U.S.
- Cause of death: Gunshot wounds
- Resting place: Springerville Cemetery; Springerville, Arizona
- Other name: Bill Cooper
- Occupations: Conspiracy theorist, radio broadcaster, author

Milton William Cooper (May 6, 1943 – November 5, 2001) was an American conspiracy theorist, radio broadcaster, and author known for his 1991 book Behold a Pale Horse, in which he warned of multiple global conspiracies, some involving extraterrestrial life. Cooper also described HIV/AIDS as a man-made disease used to target blacks, Hispanics, and homosexuals, and that a cure was made before it was implemented. He has been described as a "militia theoretician". Cooper was killed in 2001 by sheriff's deputies after he shot at them during an attempted arrest.

== Early life and education ==
Little is known about Cooper's background and education, beyond the information supplied in his own accounts. He claimed to have served in the United States Navy, the United States Air Force, and Naval Intelligence until his discharge in 1975; however, public records only indicate a period of service in the Navy with a ratings code of E-5/Sergeant (Petty officer second class in the Navy), including a tour of duty in Vietnam with two service medals. At the end of the war, while working in naval intelligence, Cooper served on a briefing team for Admiral Bernard A. Clarey. He then attended a junior college in California, and worked for several technical and vocational schools before making his conspiracy theories known, beginning in 1988. Cooper expanded the speculations of earlier conspiracists by incorporating government involvement with extraterrestrials as a central theme.

== Behold a Pale Horse ==
In 1991, Cooper wrote and published Behold a Pale Horse. The book has been influential among "UFO and militia circles". Just prior to the trial of Terry Nichols in 1997, The Guardian described it as "the manifesto of the militia movement".

According to sociologist Paul Gilroy, Cooper claimed "an elaborate conspiracy theory that encompasses the Kennedy assassination, the doings of the secret world government, the coming ice age, and a variety of other covert activities associated with the Illuminati's declaration of war upon the people of America". Political scientist Michael Barkun characterized it as "among the most complex superconspiracy theories", and also among the most influential due to its popularity in militia circles as well as mainstream bookstores. Historian Nicholas Goodrick-Clarke described the book as a "chaotic farrago of conspiracy myths interspersed with reprints of executive laws, official papers, reports and other extraneous materials designed to show the looming prospect of a world government imposed on the American people against their wishes and in flagrant contempt of the Constitution."

== UFOs, aliens and the Illuminati ==
External documents
- Text of Cooper's first post to a UFO message board

Cooper gained attention in Ufology circles in 1988 when he claimed to have seen secret documents while in the Navy describing governmental dealings with extraterrestrials, a topic on which he expounded in Behold a Pale Horse. By one account he served as a "low level clerk" in the Navy, and as such would not have had the security clearance needed to access classified documents. In the Summer of 1988, Cooper made his first public comments on the ParaNet Bulletin Board System, an early UFO message board, claiming that in 1966 he was serving aboard the USS Tiru when he and fellow Navy personnel witnessed a metal craft "larger than a football field" repeatedly enter and exit the water. Cooper claimed he was instructed by superiors to never speak about the incident. Biographer Mark Jacobson argues "the Tiru incident itself would not have done much to make Cooper's name in ufology. That opportunity came only a few days later" when he was contacted by fellow ParaNet poster John Lear. Lear, the son of Learjet founder Bill Lear, identified as a pilot who had flown missions for the CIA. Lear was the author of a post titled "The UFO Coverup" which incorporated elements of mythos from Paul Bennewitz, a ufologist who was later revealed to have been fed disinformation by American counter-intelligence agent Richard C. Doty. Cooper soon visited Lear, and the two spent much time together from 1988 to 1990.

Richard C. Doty and John Lear and have been described as the most influential UFO figures of the 1980s. Doty recruited Bill Moore and the two served as informants for Paul Bennewitz. Doty similarly supplied information to journalist Linda Moulton Howe and later collaborated with author Whitley Strieber. Meanwhile, John Lear served as informant to Bill Cooper, who in turn influenced the militia movement in general and Oklahoma City bomber Timothy McVeigh in particular. Lear granted interviews to journalist George Knapp, later introducing Bob Lazar to UFO conspiracy theories and later introducing him to Knapp. Lear also collaborated with Phil Schneider. Additionally, unconfirmed speculation holds that Doty and Lear interacted.

Cooper's views were heavily influenced by Lear and his story of alien collusion with secret governmental forces. In 1989, the two released an "indictment" against the US Government for "aiding and abetting and concealing this Alien Nation which exists in our borders". In 2018, columnist Colin Dickey noted the pair's influence, writing "in the early years [UFO writers] did not, by and large, embrace strong political positions. They were the tip of a spear asserting that the number one thing we had to fear was not little green men, but the government that colluded with them, appropriating their technology against us." Cooper and Lear's collaboration lasted for a few years, after which Cooper accused Lear of being a CIA plant.

Ufologists later asserted that some of the material Cooper claimed to have seen in Naval Intelligence documents was actually plagiarized by Cooper from their own research, including several items that the ufologists had fabricated as pranks. Don Ecker of UFO Magazine ran a series of exposés on Cooper in 1990.

Cooper linked the Illuminati with his beliefs that extraterrestrials were secretly involved with the United States government, but later retracted these claims. He accused President Dwight D. Eisenhower of negotiating a treaty with extraterrestrials in 1954, which supposedly allowed the aliens to abduct humans in exchange for technological assistance. Cooper then claimed that Eisenhower had established an inner circle of Illuminati to manage relations with the aliens and keep their presence a secret from the general public. Cooper believed that aliens "manipulated and/or ruled the human race through various secret societies, religions, magic, witchcraft, and the occult", and that even the Illuminati were unknowingly being manipulated by them.

Cooper described the Illuminati as a secret international organization, controlled by the Bilderberg Group, that conspired with the Knights of Columbus, Masons, Skull and Bones, and other organizations. Its ultimate goal, he said, was the establishment of a New World Order. According to Cooper, the Illuminati conspirators not only invented alien threats for their own gain, but actively conspired with extraterrestrials to take over the world. Cooper believed that James Forrestal's fatal fall from a window on the sixteenth floor of Bethesda Hospital was connected to the alleged secret committee Majestic 12, and that JASON advisory group scientists reported to an elite group of Trilateral Commission and Council on Foreign Relations executive committee members who were high-ranking members of the Illuminati.

Cooper also claimed that the antisemitic conspiracy theory forgery The Protocols of the Elders of Zion was actually an Illuminati work, and instructed readers to substitute "Sion" for "Zion", "Illuminati" for "Jews", and "cattle" for "Goyim". The publisher removed the chapter that was a reproduction of The Protocols of the Elders of Zion document from later printings of Behold a Pale Horse.

== Kennedy assassination ==
In Behold a Pale Horse, Cooper asserts that President John F. Kennedy was assassinated because he was about to reveal that extraterrestrials were in the process of taking over the Earth. According to a "top secret" video of the assassination that Cooper claimed to have discovered, the driver of the presidential limousine, William Greer, used "a gas pressure device developed by aliens from the Trilateral Commission" to shoot the president from the driver's seat. The Zapruder film shows Greer twice turning to look into the back seat of the car; Cooper theorized that Greer first turned to assess Kennedy's status after the external attack, and then to fire the fatal shot. Conspiracy theories implicating Greer reportedly "snowballed" after publication of Behold a Pale Horse. Cooper's video purporting to prove his theory was analyzed by several television stations, according to one source, and was found to be "... a poor-quality fake using chunks of the... Zapruder film."

== HIV/AIDS ==
In Behold a Pale Horse Cooper proposed that AIDS was the result of a conspiracy to decrease the populations of blacks, Hispanics, and homosexuals. In 2000 South Africa's Minister of Health Manto Tshabalala-Msimang received criticism for distributing the chapter discussing this theory to senior South African government officials.

== Radio show ==
From 1992 until his death in November 2001, Cooper originated his radio show, The Hour of the Time from a studio in his house at the top of a hill in the small White Mountains town of Eagar, Arizona, 15 miles from the New Mexico border. Cooper sent his show via audio cassette, satellite patch, or direct telephone link to WWCR in Nashville where it was broadcast by the station's 100,000-watt shortwave transmitter. Mark Potok, spokesman for the Southern Poverty Law Center, said Cooper was well known within the militia movement for his anti-government shortwave radio program. Oklahoma City bomber Timothy McVeigh was reportedly a fan. McVeigh was reported by The Daily Beast to have ordered from Cooper a cassette, Waco, The Big Lie, which the radio host marketed. Cooper broadcast conspiracy theories on the Waco siege in early 1993, which he believed had been the opening battle in a new Civil War. He later participated in the early radio shows of Alex Jones, who was an admirer of his broadcasts.

On June 28, 2001, commenting on a televised interview of Osama bin Laden at his hideout in Afghanistan, Cooper claimed that bin Laden would soon be "blamed" for a 'major attack' on a large U.S. city, "but don't you believe it". Immediately after the attacks on September 11, 2001, he predicted the U.S. would soon be at war in 'two or maybe three countries'. He began broadcasting the "controlled demolition" conspiracy theory on the day of the attacks, which eventually became a center of 9/11 conspiracy theories.

== Death ==
As Cooper moved away from the Ufology community and toward the militia and anti-government subculture in the late 1990s, he became convinced that he was being personally targeted by President Bill Clinton and the Internal Revenue Service. In July 1998, he was charged with tax evasion; an arrest warrant was issued, but Cooper eluded repeated attempts to serve it. In 2000, he was named a "major fugitive" by the United States Marshals Service.

On November 5, 2001, Apache County sheriff's deputies attempted to arrest Cooper at his Eagar, Arizona home on charges of aggravated assault with a deadly weapon and endangerment stemming from disputes with local residents. After an exchange of gunfire during which Cooper shot one of the deputies in the head, Cooper was fatally shot. Federal authorities reported that Cooper had spent years evading execution of the 1998 arrest warrant, and according to a spokesman for the Marshals Service, he vowed that "he would not be taken alive".

== In popular culture ==
Cooper's writing holds enduring popularity in hip hop, being referenced by artists including Public Enemy, Tupac Shakur, and Jay-Z. Ol' Dirty Bastard, a founding member of group Wu-Tang Clan, was quoted as saying "Everybody gets fucked. William Cooper tells you who’s fucking you." The rapper William Cooper took his stage name from Milton William Cooper. In 1997, hip hop group Killarmy released their debut album, Silent Weapons for Quiet Wars, a title drawn from Cooper's work.

The X-Files incorporated numerous elements of Cooper's mythos of a secret government in collusion with alien beings. In one of the most famous episodes, "Musings of a Cigarette Smoking Man", John F. Kennedy is assassinated to prevent him from revealing the existence of aliens. The 1998 X-Files film uses phrasing from Cooper (e.g. "Silent Weapons for Quiet Wars") and features the name Cooper in apparent homage.

=== Books ===
- Cooper, Milton William (1991). Behold a Pale Horse. Light Technology Publications. ISBN 0-929385-22-5.

== Lectures ==
- Truth vs Deception (Undated, audio only), 1h 14m
- Sedona Speech (September 24, 1989), 3h 26m
- The Secret Government: Origin, Identity and Purpose of the Real MJ-12 (1989), 1h 28m
- UFOs, Aliens and the Black Government (1990), 2h 2m
- Behold a Pale Horse (1991), 4h 40m
- UFO Alien Agenda Conference (September 9, 1991), 3h 37m
- The Little Ale'Inn (July 9, 1993), 1h
- Wembley Speech (January 9, 1993), 2h 45m
- Lansing, Michigan (1996), 1h
- The Porterville Presentation (1997), 11h

== Self-produced videos ==
Produced as "Shining Star Productions":

- Project Redlight (1991), 2h 2m
- Project Redlight II (1992), 1h 38m
- JFK: Assassin Unmasked (1993), 45m
- Kennedy, The Sacrificed King (1993), 1h 14m
- Luxor (1994), 54m

== Media appearances ==
- Interview with Ellie Crystal (Undated)
- UFO Investigations-The Cover Up (1989)
- On the Kennedy Assassination, KUTV (May 15, 1991)
- Dimensions in Parapsychology (1991)
- Shane Eden's The UFO Connection (1991)
- NYC Public Access Interview (April 24, 1992)
- The CNN Interview (May 3, 1992)
- Reichstag '95 (1995)
- The Land of the Lost Story (1999), dir. Anna Zetchus Smith
- The Hour of Our Time: The Legacy of William Cooper (2006), dir. Jim Jankiewicz
