= Philip Schneider (conspiracy theorist) =

American conspiracy theorist (1947–1996)

Phil Schneider
- Schneider in 1995
- Born: April 23, 1947; Bethesda, Maryland
- Died: January 17, 1996 (aged 48); Wilsonville, Oregon
- Years active: 1994-1995
- Known for: Dulce Base conspiracy theories, Alien-Human treaty conspiracy theories

Philip Schneider (April 23, 1947 - January 17, 1996) was a promoter of conspiracy theories. He was known for his unsubstantiated claims about the Dulce Base conspiracy theory, an earlier story of aliens fighting humans in an underground base that had previously been put forward by John Lear, Rick Doty, and Bob Lazar in the 1980s.

After his death, Schneider's former wife revealed he had suffered from paranoid schizophrenia. Skeptics and UFO believers have both argued Schneider's conspiracy views were delusions based on the Dulce Base claims of his associate John Lear.

== Early life ==
Philip Schneider was born in 1947 to mother Sally and father Oscar Schneider, a Navy doctor who had been involved in the 1945 Bikini atoll atomic test. In 1967, he served as an usher in his brother's wedding.

Schneider claimed to be a professional engineer and geologist, but author Greg Valdez could find no evidence to substantiate these claims.

== Promotion of conspiracy theories ==
External videos
- "Underground bases and the New World Order" - May 8, 1995 lecture in Post Falls, Idaho
- "ETs, UFOs, and New World Technology" - August 14, 1995 lecture in Denver, Colorado
- "Secret Underground Bases and the New World Order" September 1995 lecture in Seattle, Washington
- November 1995 lecture in Denver, Colorado

In 1995, citing a terminal illness, Schneider gave a series of lectures in which he promoted a number of popular conspiracy theories that had originated with John Lear including an Alien-Human Treaty, Dulce Base, and the Dulce War—a supposed battle between Aliens and Humans in the secret underground base. Schneider also promoted theories of the Philadelphia Experiment and the New World Order and he put forward the unsubstantiated claim that a nuclear weapon was used in the 1993 World Trade Center bombing.

Richard C. Doty and John Lear and have been described as the most influential UFO figures of the 1980s. Doty recruited Bill Moore and the two served as informants for Paul Bennewitz. Doty similarly supplied information to journalist Linda Moulton Howe and later collaborated with author Whitley Strieber. Meanwhile, John Lear served as informant to Bill Cooper, who in turn influenced the militia movement in general and Oklahoma City bomber Timothy McVeigh in particular. Lear granted interviews to journalist George Knapp, later introducing Bob Lazar to UFO conspiracy theories and later introducing him to Knapp. Lear also collaborated with Phil Schneider. Additionally, unconfirmed speculation holds that Doty and Lear interacted.

Author Greg Valdez argues Schneider was directly influenced by Lear. Writes Valdez: "If you view the Phil Schneider story from a legal standard of preponderance of evidence or beyond a reasonable doubt, there is no evidence to support his story... Based on this lack of evidence and the cumulative issues about Phil, the Phil Schneider story about Dulce is not credible, and neither are the stories of alien/government firefights, especially in light of where these stories originated from: John Lear and the air force.... Since Phil did not enter the Dulce story until the mid-1990s, his story has no evidentiary strength because a lot of Phil’s story had already been around the UFO community for several years. Phil also met with John Lear in Las Vegas, according to Lear’s interviews."

American UFOlogist Norio Hayakawa likewise dismisses Schneider's claims as delusions.

== Death ==
In January 1996, Schneider died, with his death being ascribed to stroke. According to his former wife, Schneider suffered from a wide array of medical conditions at the time of his death, include osteoporosis, chronic back pain, seizures, multiple sclerosis, and cancer. She recalled "he had to use crutches, a body brace, leg braces, bladder bag, catheter, diapers, and a wheelchair. He often had to sleep in a hospital bed with railings, a helmet, and body braces."

After his death, former wife Cynthia suggested Schneider might have died of foul play, a claim dismissed by Valdez and Hayakawa.

== Posthumous biographical information ==
In 1999, UFO Digest published an article by Tim Schwartz in which Schneider's former wife Cynthia gave further biographical details about Philip. She recalled first meeting him in 1986 at a meeting of the Oregon Agate and Mineral Society. The pair married in 1987 and had one daughter before divorcing in 1990.

Former wife Cynthia shared that Schneider was "paranoid schizophrenic" and could be "emotionally abusive". Cynthia recalled that "under crisis or pressure, he would tell people that he had been arrested, or that people from the sheriff's office or government had been at his door", adding "like 'the little boy who cried wolf', his friends became numb to his reports". She felt "he was learning disabled, brilliant in some areas, yet unable to fill out a form in the Doctors office."

External documents
- Philip Schneider documents obtained via Freedom of Information Act

After his death, documents obtained via FOIA revealed Schneider had been hospitalized for schizophrenia at Dammasch State Hospital from July 30, 1968 to January 29, 1969. According to documents, Schneider had a history of self-harm and had amputated two of his own fingers. According to documents released after his death, on March 22, 1975, Schneider had been interviewed by the FBI for his possession of radioactive minerals. Schneider told investigators he had kept the material under his bed and reported nausea and other health effects since he took possession. He told investigators he had no idea the material posed health hazards or violated the law.
