= Richard C. Doty =

Richard Charles Doty is a former non-commissioned officer in the US Air Force who has played a critical role in promoting UFO conspiracy theories since the 1980s. Doty has been described as "one of the most controversial figures in the history of the UFO". In the 2013 documentary film Mirage Men, he admits to misleading UFO believers as part of an Air Force disinformation campaign.

== Early life ==
Richard C. Doty joined the Air Force in 1968.

In his book, Doty reports he was born to Charles Doty on February 15, 1950, and contemporary reporting confirms a son was born that day to Charles and Thelma Anthony Doty of 705 North Lehigh Ave of Sayre, Pennsylvania.

Doty has claimed his father Charles was an Air Force colonel, while the 1950 census lists an occupation of "railroad car inspector" for the 52 year old Charles Doty of 705 North Lehigh Ave, husband of Thelma A. and father of Richard Charles (born the prior February). Doty has variously claimed to be the son or nephew of Edward A. Doty (1920–2010), an Air Force officer involved in Project Twinkle, but an obituary published in 1955 indicated that Charles G. Doty of Sayres had only one surviving brother, named Hovey. Pilkington observes: "it would seem that Doty may have extended his disinformation training into his personal life."

Doty grew up in Pennsylvania and graduated from Athens High School in June 1968. (Note: Contemporary reporting covers Doty's early life.) In his book, Doty reports joining the Air Force in 1968, and contemporary reporting, with photograph, confirms that Richard Charles Doty, son of Charles G. Doty, joined the Air Force.

== Early military career ==
Doty attended basic training at Lackland Air Force Base. He was sent to Sheppard Air Force Base in Wichita Falls, Texas, where he served as a security policeman. Doty and others report his having been married and fathering a son, confirmed by an August 1969 marriage announcement and a 1983 notice of divorce.

Doty was transferred to Phan Rang Air Base in Vietnam. In December 1970, Sgt. Doty was awarded the Air Force Commendation Medal. After his tour of duty in Vietnam, Doty served two years at McChord Air Force Base in Washington state. He received a second Commendation medal in June 1971. His time at McChord was followed by three years as a gate guard at Wiesbaden Air Base, West Germany. In 1976, he transferred to Ellsworth Air Force Base, in South Dakota. In March 1978, Doty began six weeks of training at the Non Commissioned Officers Academy.

== Office of Special Investigations agent ==
By May 1979, Doty was serving with Air Force Office of Special Investigations (AFOSI) at Kirtland Air Force Base (AFB) in New Mexico.

=== Cattle mutilations ===
In the 1970s and early 1980s, ranchers near Dulce, New Mexico, reported cattle being tranquilized, killed, exsanguinated, and biopsied with various organs removed. Witnesses reported seeing stealth helicopters hovering over herds. When helicopters evaded pursuit by local law enforcement, officiers began to suspect their English-lanuaged radio communications were being overheard by the pilots; switching to the Apache language allowed police to successfully close in one such helicopter, forcing it to fly overhead where it sounded "like a lawn mower".

Modern mainstream theories of cattle mutilation speculate they might have been a covert attempt to detect emerging public health threats in the food supply. One potential threat might be 1967's Project Gasbuggy, in which an underground atomic device was detonated just 21 mi (34 km) southwest of Dulce. Others suggest the events might be part of a chemical or biological weapons test, citing the March 1968 case where 6,000 sheep were killed as part of chemical weapons testing; the Army denied responsibility until 1998.

Richard C. Doty and John Lear and have been described as the most influential UFO figures of the 1980s. Doty recruited Bill Moore and the two served as informants for Paul Bennewitz. Doty similarly supplied information to journalist Linda Moulton Howe and later collaborated with author Whitley Strieber. Meanwhile, John Lear served as informant to Bill Cooper, who in turn influenced the militia movement in general and Oklahoma City bomber Timothy McVeigh in particular. Lear granted interviews to journalist George Knapp, later introducing Bob Lazar to UFO conspiracy theories and later introducing him to Knapp. Lear also collaborated with Phil Schneider. Additionally, unconfirmed speculation holds that Doty and Lear interacted.

Over the coming years, Doty befriended cattle mutilation and UFO researchers and supplied them with bogus documents and information claiming that the deaths were caused by malevolent extraterrestrial aliens rather than the US military.

=== Relationship with Paul Bennewitz ===
On April 20, 1979, US Attorney R. E. Thompson and US Senator Harrison Schmidt held a public meeting in Albuquerque, New Mexico, about the ongoing cattle mutilations. The meeting was attended by about 80, including Paul Bennewitz, an engineer, entrepreneur, scientist, and ufologist who lived near Kirtland AFB and had been monitoring what he believed to be UFOs operating there and in the nearby Manzano Mountains. Mirage Men suggests government agents likely "first identified" Bennewitz at this meeting and perhaps outright targeted him for his participation.

External documents
- "Project Beta" by Paul Bennewitz

On October 26, 1980, Bennewitz began communicating with Doty. On November 10, Doty invited Bennewitz to Kirtland AFB and made statements corroborating Bennewitz's belief that aliens were responsible for the mutilations. Doty continued this relationship with Bennewitz over a number of years, leading Bennewitz to think that he was under alien attack. In 1988, Paul Bennewitz wrote a paper titled "Project Beta" detailing how the base might be successfully attacked. By August 1988, Bennewitz was accusing his wife of being in control of the extraterrestrials. After attempting to barricade himself in his home using sandbags, his family committed him to the mental health unit of Presbyterian Anna Kaseman Hospital.

Bennewitz died in 2003. Ten years later, in 2013, Doty would admit that Bennewitz was the victim of a US Air Force disinformation campaign.

=== Relationship with Bill Moore ===
To aid him in his disinformation campaign against Bennewitz and others, Doty recruited Bill Moore, co-author of The Philadelphia Experiment (1979) and The Roswell Incident (1980). Moore's role was report on civillian UFO investigations and to feed corrobrating disinformation to Doty's targets.

On September 8, 1980, after doing a radio show in Albuquerque, Moore was contacted by an Doty. As Doty sought to "steer [Bennewitz] deeper into his War of the Worlds fantasy", Moore provided details of ongoing UFO investigations. That information was the used to create "bogus government documentation" to use as disinformation against Bennewitz and the UFO community.

External videos
- Bill Moore addresses MUFON, July 1 1989

At a 1989 Mutual UFO Network (MUFON) conference, Bill Moore publicly announced that he had been engaged in "disinformation" activities against Paul Bennewitz on behalf of AFOSI, which Moore claimed had co-opted him by falsely promising he would be given access to genuine government documents about UFOs.

=== Relationship with Linda Moulton Howe ===
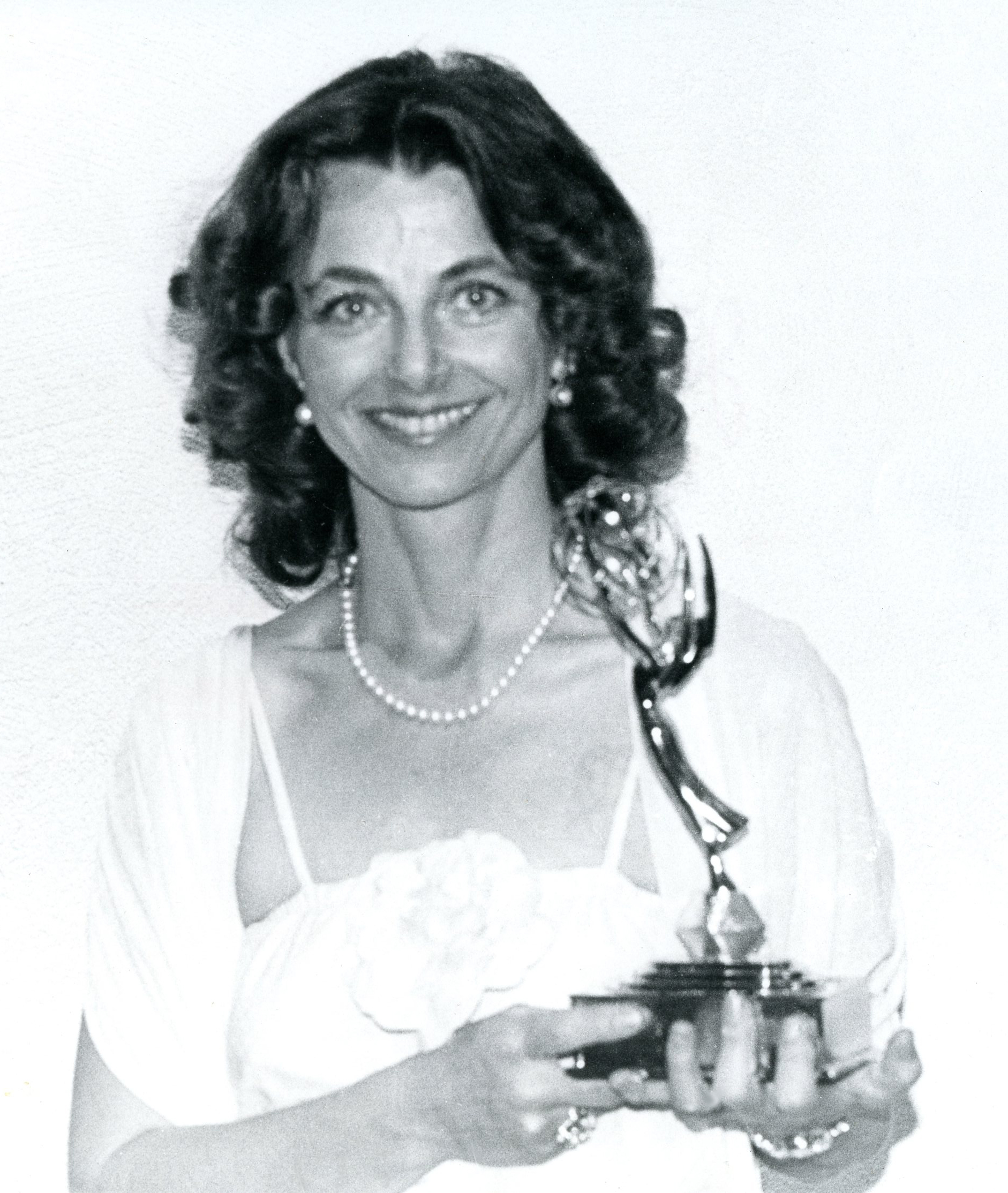
Howe in 1981

In 1980, investigative journalist Linda Moulton Howe wrote, produced, and directed A Strange Harvest, a documentary about cattle mutiliations. In 1982, Howe was approached by HBO, which was interested in her developing a documentary for their network.

In 1983, Doty contacted her, claiming to be able to supply her Air Force records for her upcoming documentary. Doty invited Howe to Kirtland AFB, and on April 9th, 1983, the two met at the base, where he showed her fabricated "presidential brief papers". Howe recalls the paper said extraterrestrials had genetically-engineered humans by manipulating primate DNA.

Doty failed to supply the promised documents and the HBO documentary was never produced. In 1989, Doty was named in Linda Moulton Howe's book An Alien Harvest, making him into a public figure.

Doty initially denied Howe's account, but in the 2013 documentary Mirage Men, Doty admitted his role misleading Howe.

=== Role in Cash-Landrum incident ===
On December 29, 1980, Betty Cash, Vickie Landrum, and Vickie's grandson Colby were driving to their home in Dayton, Texas, when they witnessed an unidentified aircraft escorted by US Air Force helicopters. They reported the unidentified aircraft emitted bursts of flames from its center. They reported their car became hot, with door handles burning their hands and vinyl dashboard becoming soft enough to leave imprints in.

In the aftermath, they reported suffering from nausea, vomiting, diarrhea, generalized weakness, a burning sensation in their eyes, and feeling as though they were suffering from sunburn. Later they reported suffering skin blistering, loss of hair, and weakness. Believing they had been harmed by an experimental US craft, Cash and Landrum contacted their senators, Lloyd Bentsen and John Tower, and later sued the US federal government for $20 million.

In January 1983, Doty met with plaintiff attorney Peter Gersten. Doty asked to join Gersten's group, "Citizens Against UFO Secrecy"; Gerstein denied admission to Doty.

US district court judge Ross N. Sterling dismissed Cash and Landrum's lawsuit on August 21, 1986.

=== Connection to Whitley Strieber ===
In 1990, it was reported that Doty had contacted Whitley Strieber, a horror novelist whose own supposed alien abductions were detailed in his 1987 book Communion. In 2006, Strieber and Doty appeared on fringe radioshow Coast to Coast AM to promote theories of "Project Serpo".

=== UFO Cover Up? Live ===
External videos
- UFO Cover Up? Live!

UFO Cover Up? Live was a US television broadcast which aired in syndication on October 14, 1988. The program introduced Americans to the Majestic 12, which many skeptics and ufologists alike consider to be a hoax. It featured the first public mention of Nevada's Area 51 as a site associated with aliens. Tthe program interviewed shadow-clad informants "Falcon" (Richard Doty) and Condor (Robert M. Collins). In the program, Doty told a story of three aliens (called "extraterrestrial biological entities" or EBEs) that were "guests" of the United States government, one of which was fond of strawberry ice cream. Doty claimed the aliens came from Zeta Reticuli. Condor and Falcon claimed that the US government and the aliens had entered into an agreement to allow them to operate a base in Area 51.

Doty was identified by Gerstein and Howe.

=== Alleged disciplinary action ===
Doty was transferred to West Germany, where he was reportedly disciplined. In 1991, UFO skeptic Phillip Klass reported: "While Doty was in West Germany, his superiors became suspicious that some of his reports of alleged contacts with Communist secret agents were concocted tales... His last year in the USAF was spent working as a "food services specialist" managing the mess hall."

In 1995, Klass expanded on his claims, writing: "In early 1985, Sgt. Doty was transferred to West Germany and assigned to counterintelligence work where his proclivity for spinning tall tales soon got him into trouble. As a result Doty reportedly was charged with submitting two spurious reports about his contacts and a false claim for funds he allegedly had spent for counterintelligence activities. The USAF decided against a court-martial because it would disclose counterintelligence details. Instead, Doty reportedly was "given Article 15, " his rank was reduced to Technical Sergeant and he was dropped from AFOSI. Doty ended his USAF career in the Services Squadron at Kirtland AFB where his duties included managing the non-commissioned officers' mess hall."

Pilkington likewise claims Doty was "asked to leave AFOSI following an unspecified incident at Wiesbaden AFB, [sic] (Note: Wiesbaden Air Base was a United States Army Aviation base that hosted US Air Force personnel and facilities; since the Air Force did not control the facility and did not base aircraft there, it was not an air force base (AFB).) West Germany, in 1986."

== Later life and Serpo email hoax ==
After his departure from the Air Force, Doty joined the New Mexico State Police. (Note: Richard Doty of the New Mexico State Police is referenced in contemporary reporting.)

In November 2005, a series of emails were sent to a UFO discussion group telling of 'Project Serpo', a supposed "exchange program" where humans travelled to an alien homeworld. The story was noted for is similarity to elements of the 1977 Spielberg blockbuster Close Encounter of the Third Kind.

The initial anonymous email, along with supposedly-corroborating emails, were traced back to the same IP address as Doty. Writes Pilkingon: "This fingered Rick, the only member of the group known actually to exist outside of cyberspace, as the probable sender of the original emails". In 2006, Doty was the co-author of a book titled Exempt from Disclosure, which further spread Serpo legends. It has been alleged that the entire series of posts were designed to promote Doty's book.

== Admits role in disinformation ==
In 2005, the book Project Beta: The Story of Paul Bennewitz, National Security, and the Creation of a Modern UFO Myth by Greg Bishop further publicized the events.

Mark Pilkington's book about the project, Mirage Men, was published in 2010 by Constable & Robinson. The book was adapted into the 2013 documentary Mirage Men, which interviewed Doty for his role in the deception.

Despite his admissions, Doty has continued to promote UFO conspiracy theories, appearing in a variety of UFO documentaries including Unacknowledged (2017) and Close Encounters of the Fifth Kind (2020).

== Legacy and aftermath ==
Pilkington described Doty as a "Mephistophelean character who haunted the underworld of UFO literature", while another source opines: "Doty has probably contributed more to the UFO-government conspiracy rumours than everyone else combined." Greg Valdez warns: "If you research any of the documents created or presented by Richard Doty or Bill Moore, be very careful what you consider truth in those documents, and be very aware that they might make you more confused."

After Doty's departure from the Air Force, similar UFO legends were spread by John Lear, a CIA pilot. Lear, in turn, associated himself with a variety of supposed UFO informants including Bill Cooper, Bob Lazar, and Phil Schneider who each echoed Doty and Lear's claims. Valdez reports that Lear and Doty may have been "at the same location in Laos during the Vietnam war". Valdez adds: "There is a very high likelihood Doty and Lear worked together to produce the Dulce Papers", referring to documents purporting to detail an alien base under Dulce, New Mexico.

== See also ==
- Fred Crisman, promoter of the Maury Island hoax
- Carl Meredith Allen, promoter of the Philadelphia Experiment hoax
