= Moya Lear =

American businesswoman, wife of Bill Lear (1915–2001)

- Born: Moya Marie Olsen; March 27, 1915; Chicago, Illinois, U.S.
- Died: December 5, 2001 (aged 86); Reno, Nevada, U.S.
- Other name: Moya Olsen
- Spouse: Bill Lear (m. 1940)
- Children: 4, including John Lear
- Father: Ole Olsen

Moya Marie Olsen Lear (March 27, 1915 – December 5, 2001) was an American businesswoman and philanthropist who was the wife of aviation pioneer Bill Lear.

== Early life and education ==
Moya Marie Olsen was born in Chicago, the daughter of Lillian (Clem) Olsen (1890–1990) and vaudeville performer Ole Olsen, whose Depression-era show Hellzapoppin' was one of the longest running Broadway musicals in history. Moya attended Ohio State University and the Pace Institute in New York.

== Career ==
Moya was introduced to Bill Lear by her father in his dressing room in 1938 while she was writing "The Book" for the play. She told Victor Boesen that she had dreamed of being a famous dancer, in the mold of Anna Pavlova and Vaslav Nijinsky, only to be told by her teacher that she would make a good jitterbug. Lear and she were married in 1942. In 1946, the couple moved to Grand Rapids, Michigan, where Lear conducted his avionics manufacturing and development.

In 1967, the Learjet company was sold and the Stead Air Force Base near Reno, Nevada, was acquired. Moya became active in Nevada Festival Ballet, the Sierra Arts Foundation, and Nevada Opera.

She received six honorary doctoral degrees. She devoted a substantial amount of time to philanthropy in the Reno, Nevada, area. After the death of her husband, Lear attempted with investors to complete his innovative lightweight turboprop airplane, the LearAvia Lear Fan. The project ultimately failed to obtain FAA certification because of a gearing problem, and never went into production.

From 1981 to 1983, Bonnie Tiburzi put on three "Women of Accomplishment" luncheons for the Wings Club honoring certain women, including Moya Lear.

== Personal life ==
Moya and Bill Lear had four children: well-known pilot, UFOlogist and conspiracy theorist John Lear, Shanda Lear, David and Tina. Lear died in Reno, Nevada, in 2001.
