= Timothy Good =

English author on UFOs (born 1942)

Timothy Good (born 28 July 1942) is a British author on UFOs. His books include Above Top Secret: The Worldwide U.F.O. Cover-up (1987), Alien Liaison (1991) and Beyond Top Secret (1996), all published by Sidgwick & Jackson. Good has made many television and documentary appearances. Critics challenged the reliability of his writings. Good was born in London. He has also had a career as a violinist.

== Career ==
Good is a British author about UFOs. In 1987 it was reported in The Observer that he was "Britain's leading UFO researcher".

In his 1987 book Above Top Secret: The Worldwide U.F.O. Cover-up, he was involved in the initial publication of the purported Majestic 12 documents; later, according to skeptic Phil Klass, Good questioned the authenticity of at least some of the documents. In 2007, the CIA cited Above Top Secret as one of the sources contributing to "the idea that CIA has secretly concealed its research into UFOs".

In 2012 Good was interviewed on the BBC's Frank Skinner's Opinionated show.

In May 2019, Tom DeLonge of Blink-182 credited Good's books with "opening his eyes" into UFOs, leading to DeLonge's development of To The Stars.

== Criticism ==
Martin Bridgstock, in a review of Above Top Secret: The Worldwide U.F.O. Cover-up for The Skeptic in 1989, identified two of the book's central ideas: that "Unidentified Flying Objects (UFOs) do exist, and are spacecraft from other worlds" and "there is a worldwide cover-up about UFOs, with security agencies seeking to suppress the evidence". Bridgstock concluded that the book:

is not a clear, rigorous survey of the evidence for UFOs. It is a polemical volume, which seems to be devoted to making the case for UFOs, and a cover-up, seems as convincing as possible. However, inspection of the theses put forward in the book, and checking of a few cases with other sources, seem to show that the book is not reliable and its conclusion cannot be trusted.

== Personal life ==
Good was born in Islington, London.

== Bibliography ==
- George Adamski: The Untold Story. With Lou Zinsstag. Beckenham: Ceti, 1983. ISBN 978-0950841403. With a foreword by Marcia Falkender, Baroness Falkender.
- Above Top Secret: The Worldwide UFO Cover-up. Sidgwick & Jackson, 1987. ISBN 978-0283994968. With a foreword by Lord Hill-Norton, GCB.
- Alien Liaison. London: Century, 1991. ISBN 978-0712621946.
  - Alien Contact: Top-Secret UFO Files Revealed. USA: New Leaf, 1993. ISBN 978-0688135102.
- Alien Update. Edited by Good. Arrow, 1993. ISBN 978-0099257615.
- Beyond Top Secret. Sidgwick & Jackson, 1996. ISBN 978-0283062452. With a foreword by Peter Hill-Norton.
- Alien Base. Century, 1998. ISBN 978-0712678124.
- Unearthly Disclosure. Century, 2000. ISBN 9780712684651. With a foreword by Peter Hill-Norton.
- Need to Know. Sidgwick & Jackson, 2006. ISBN 978-0330442961.
- Earth: an Alien Enterprise. Pegasus, 2013. ISBN 978-1605986388.
