= John Lear =

American aviator and conspiracy theorist (1942–2022)

- Lear (right) with collaborator Bob Lazar in 1989
- Born: John Olsen Lear; December 3, 1942
- Died: March 29, 2022 (aged 79)
- Education: Wichita State University
- Occupation: Pilot
- Known for: UFO conspiracy theories including Dulce Base and Alien-Human treaty
- Spouse: Marcelle Tagand (div. 1970) Marilee Higginbotham (m. 1970)
- Parent(s): Bill Lear (father); Moya Lear (mother)
- Relatives: Ole Olsen (grandfather)

John Olsen Lear (December 3, 1942 – March 29, 2022) was an American aviator and UFO conspiracy theorist. A son of Learjet magnate Bill Lear, Lear set multiple records, later flying cargo planes for the CIA during the Vietnam era. In the 1980s, he began speaking of alien collusion with secret governmental forces, and in the second half of the decade, Lear was "probably the most influential source" of UFO conspiracy theories.

== Early life ==
John Olsen Lear was born on December 3, 1942, to industrialist and future Learjet founder Bill Lear and his wife Moya Marie Olsen Lear. He was named after his maternal grandfather, famous comedian John Olsen. His second and third birthday parties were covered in the "Society" page of an Ohio paper.

Lear graduated from the Institut Le Rosey boarding school in Switzerland and attended Wichita State University.

== Aviator career ==
In 1956, Lear flew his first flight at age 14. His first solo flight was at 16, and in 1960, Lear was hired as a pilot and public relationship representative by his father's company. In 1962, Lear crashed a biplane during stunt flying at his boarding school; he underwent an emergency tracheotomy, a five-hour surgery, and a long convalescence.

That year, Lear agreed to attend a Pasadena, California Art College. He was given $5,000 to pay the tuition fee but lost it in the stock market. Lear and his father remained estranged, and when his father died in 1979, John Lear was excluded from the will, which was generous to John's children.

In 1965, Lear was employed by the Paul Kelly Flying Service when its founder was killed while piloting a LearJet. Lear testified at the Civil Aeronautics Board investigation into the crash.

Between May 23 and 26, 1966, Lear and a crewmate flew a record-breaking flight around the world in a LearJet that covered 22,000 miles in 50 hours and 39 minutes. In August 1966, Lear was featured in the Wichita Press after he piloted a LearJet carrying the rock band The Byrds and the trip inspired them to write a song about the plane. The track, titled "2-4-2 Foxtrot (The Lear Jet Song)", samples Lear's voice as he speaks over the radio.

In 1968, Air Force personnel from Hamilton Air Force Base launched a rescue effort to help Lear land after heavy San Francisco fog interfered with landing. Traffic was cleared from the Golden Gate Bridge in anticipation of a forced landing. After a helicopter pilot established visual contact, Lear was able to successfully land at the base.

Lear flew planes for the CIA between 1967 and 1983.

In 1980, Lear was covered in local press when he lost a billing dispute with his natural gas provider. That November, Lear ran for Nevada State Senate, earning the endorsement of a "Coalition for Affordable Energy".

== Lear and UFOlogy ==
John Lear and Richard C. Doty and have been described as the most influential UFO figures of the 1980s. John Lear served as informant to Bill Cooper, who in turn influenced the militia movement in general and Oklahoma City bomber Timothy McVeigh in particular. Lear granted interviews to journalist George Knapp, later introducing Bob Lazar to UFO conspiracy theories and later introducing him to Knapp. Lear also collaborated with Phil Schneider. Meanwhile Richard C. Doty recruited Bill Moore and the two served as informants for Paul Bennewitz. Doty similarly supplied information to journalist Linda Moulton Howe and later collaborated with author Whitley Strieber. Meanwhile, unconfirmed speculation holds that Doty and Lear interacted.

=== UFO conspiracy theories before Lear ===
Since the 1947 flying disc craze, Americans had reported seeing unidentified objects in the skies, and by 1955, UFO researchers were accusing the US Government of a cover-up. In the 1950s and 60s, many UFO and contactee groups professed belief in Space Brothers, benevolent aliens eager to improve life on Earth. During a 1964 hypnotic regression, Barney Hill became the first person to report recollections of Gray Aliens and Alien Abductions. By 1973, UFO mythology told of a UFO landing at Holloman Air Force Base. By 1978, UFO mythology included a crashed flying saucer near Roswell. In 1980, cattle mutilations near Dulce, New Mexico were linked to UFOs in popular media.

In 1984, ufologist Bill Moore's partner Jaime Shandera received an envelope containing film which, when developed, showed images of eight pages of documents that appeared to be briefing papers describing "Operation Majestic 12", a top-level UFO group with the US Government.

=== Statement by John Lear ===
External media
- George Knapp interview of John Lear, KLAS TV 1987
- Lear lecture at Spring Valley Library, Las Vegas, 1988
- Statement by John Lear (rev. August 25, 1988) hosted by the Internet Sacred Text Archive

On December 29, 1987, Lear posted a statement to ParaNet, an early bulletin board system dedicated to the paranormal, claiming that the US government has close contacts with extraterrestrials and were secretly "promoting" films like E.T.: The Extra-Terrestrial and Close Encounters of the Third Kind to influence the public to see extraterrestrials as "space brothers". The document was revised on January 14, again in March, with a final revision dated August 25, 1988, describing a secret government committee, Majestic 12, making a US-Alien treaty with Gray aliens, only to later realize they've been deceived by the aliens.

The statement claims a UFO coverup has been underway for 40 years. Lear argues that "Germany may have recovered a flying saucer in 1939" and discusses the 1946 American military investigation into the Ghost rockets reported over Sweden. The statement argues that many in the "original group" of insiders committed suicide, most notably James Forrestal. According to the narrative, Truman formed a group of twelve insiders, known as Majestic 12, to investigate the matter. The statement lists three saucer crashes: one near Roswell. another near Aztec, New Mexico and a third near Laredo, Texas. According to the statement, the US government covered a "total, thorough and sweeping cover-up to include the use of 'deadly force'".

The statement references the 1952 Washington, D.C., UFO incident and a 1964 meeting with aliens at Holloman Air Force Base. Lear's statement includes government-sanctioned alien abductions, alien implants, and Alien-Human hybrids. The statement asserts that "some of the nations missing children had been used for secretions and other parts required by the aliens". Lear described UFOs in connection with cattle mutilations and even claims that human mutilations have occurred. Lear talks about Dulce Base and an altercation between aliens and the US military that led to 66 human casualties.

Lear's statement influenced Thomas Allen LeVesque, pen name "Jason Bishop III", who later admitted to fabricating stories about Dulce Base. Mirage Men author Mark Pilkington later described Lear's statement as "a perfect synthesis of the Aquarius and MJ-12 disinformation and the chthonic [subterranean], paranoiac horrors of Paul Bennewitz". Valdez reports that Lear and Doty may have been "at the same location in Laos during the Vietnam war", adding, "There is a very high likelihood Doty and Lear worked together to produce the Dulce Papers".

On January 28, 1988, Lear was interviewed by TV journalist George Knapp.

=== "Immovable Object" legend ===
In his 1987 statement, Lear claimed, without evidence, that "One saucer was so enormous and the logistical problems in transportation so enormous that it was buried at the crash site and remains there today." In 2023, fringe UFO journalist Ross Coulthart echoed that claim when he reported, also without evidence, to have knowledge of a UFO that was "too big to move". In 2026, Missouri congressman Eric Burlison made a similar assertion, again without evidence.

Fringe outlet The UFO Times called the similar statements an "Information Echo", writing "At first glance, the similarity between [accounts] appears to provide corroboration... But genuine corroboration requires independent evidence. If Burlison’s classified source was repeating information that ultimately originated with Coulthart’s source—or with the same network of UAP witnesses and contractors—the second account would not constitute independent confirmation. It would represent an information echo: one allegation circulating through journalists, officials and congressional offices until repetition creates the appearance of multiple sources. To establish independent corroboration, investigators would need to demonstrate that separate sources reached the same conclusion through different access and different evidence chains. That has not been shown publicly."

=== Relationship with Bill Cooper ===
External documents
- Bill Cooper's first post to the ParaNet Bulletin Board System discussing USS Tiru incident
- Cooper's "Petition to Indict" written with Lear's help

Lear had been posting "wild conspiracies about secret government relations with aliens" to Paranet. The New Republic argues Lear's theories were "the kind of thing no one took very seriously". That changed in the summer of 1988, when UFO witness Bill Cooper made his first public comments on the ParaNet Bulletin Board System. According to Cooper's first post, in 1966 he was serving aboard the USS Tiru when he and fellow Navy personnel witnessed a metal craft "larger than a football field" repeatedly enter and exit the water. Cooper claimed he was instructed by superiors to never speak about the incident.

Biographer Mark Jacobson argues "the Tiru incident itself would not have done much to make Cooper's name in ufology. That opportunity came only a few days later" when he was contacted by fellow ParaNet poster John Olsen Lear. The two began a collaboration.

In 1989, the pair issued an "indictment" demanding that the US "cease aiding and abetting and concealing this Alien Nation which exists in our borders."

=== Introduction of Bob Lazar and Area 51 ===
External media

Images
- Lear and Lazar, 1988-1989 photos

Audio
- Lear and Lazar interview, Coast-to-Coast AM 1992

Video
- March 1989 footage of Bob Lazar with John Lear and filmmaker Gene Huff

Lear reportedly met Bob Lazar, a Vegas-area photo developer in 1988. In November 1988, Lear travelled with aviation journalist Jim Goodall to Groom Lake. In March-April 1989, Lear and Lazar repeatedly journeyed to the outskirts of "Area 51".

Lear introduced journalist George Knapp to UFO whistle-blower Bob Lazar and his tales of Area 51. According to Lazar's unsubstantiated claims, shortly after meeting Lazar, Lear was briefly employed help "reverse engineer" extraterrestial technology -- decades later, Lear would claim he arranged for Lazar to get this supposed UFO job.

On May 15, 1989, KLAS-TV broadcast a live interview between George Knapp and Lazar, clad in shadow and using the pseudonym "Dennis". The following November, Lazar again appeared, this time unmasked and under his own name.

Lazar's claims were widely discredited. (Note: According to spotlight by KLAS-TV: The schools in which Lazar claims to have studied "say they've never heard of him" (6:05); Lazar alleges he worked at Los Alamos, "where he experimented with the world's largest particle beam accelerators" (6:13); George Knapp: Los Alamos officials say they had no records of him ever working there (6:25); George Knapp: "they were either mistaken or were lying: a 1982 phonebook from the lab lists Lazar right there among the other scientists and technicians" (news section shows the cover of a Los Alamos national laboratory phone directory, and then a list of names which includes "Lazar Robert") (6:30); George Knapp: "we called Los Alamos again. An exasperated official told us he still had no records on Lazar. EG&G, which is where Lazar says he was interviewed for the job at S4, also has no records." (6:48); The news section cuts to Lazar who claims he called the schools he attended, the hospital he was born in, and his past job to get records, but to no avail. (7:00); Lazar alleges his employer at S4 was the US Navy. (7:21)) His supposed employment at a Nellis Air Force Base subsidiary has also been discredited by skeptics, as well as by the United States Air Force.

=== Role in 1989 symposium ===
External videos
- Bill Moore addresses MUFON, July 1 1989

In 1989, Lear served as State Director for The Mutual UFO Network, hosting their 1989 annual convention in Las Vegas, Nevada, on July 1, 1989. The symposium was titled: "The UFO Cover-Up: A Government Conspiracy?" Despite initial objections from MUFON founder Walt Andrus, Lear was able to submit a slate of speakers after he threatened to split the symposium. Lear's speakers were slated to provide allegedly independent verification of the Bennewitz claims. One of those speakers, Bill Cooper, would later break with Lear after accusing him of being an intelligence agent.

The Ufologist Bill Moore was scheduled as the main speaker, and he refused to submit his paper for review prior to the convention, and also announced that he would not answer any follow-up questions as was common practice. Unlike most of the convention's attendees, Moore did not stay at the same hotel that was hosting the convention.

When he spoke, Moore said that he and others had been part of an elaborate, long-term disinformation campaign begun primarily to discredit Paul Bennewitz: "My role in the affair ... was primarily that of a freelancer providing information on Paul's (Bennewitz) current thinking and activities". Air Force Sergeant Richard C. Doty was also involved, said Moore, though Moore thought Doty was "simply a pawn in a much larger game, as was I." One of their goals, Moore said, was to disseminate information and watch as it was passed from person to person in order to study information channels.

Moore said that he "was in a rather unique position" in the disinformation campaign: "judging by the positions of the people I knew to be directly involved in it, [the disinformation] definitely had something to do with national security. There was no way I was going to allow the opportunity to pass me by ... I would play the disinformation game, get my hands dirty just often enough to lead those directing the process into believing I was doing what they wanted me to do, and all the while continuing to burrow my way into the matrix so as to learn as much as possible about who was directing it and why." Once he finished the speech, Moore immediately left the hotel and Las Vegas that same night.

=== Influence on Phil Schneider ===
Author Greg Valdez argues 1995 conspiracy lecturer Phil Schneider was directly influenced by Lear. Writes Valdez: "If you view the Phil Schneider story from a legal standard of preponderance of evidence or beyond a reasonable doubt, there is no evidence to support his story... Based on this lack of evidence and the cumulative issues about Phil, the Phil Schneider story about Dulce is not credible, and neither are the stories of alien/government firefights, especially in light of where these stories originated from: John Lear and the air force.... Since Phil did not enter the Dulce story until the mid-1990s, his story has no evidentiary strength because a lot of Phil’s story had already been around the UFO community for several years. Phil also met with John Lear in Las Vegas, according to Lear’s interviews."

=== Legacy ===
Lear remained a prominent voice in the UFO conspiracy theory community until his death. Lear made multiple appearances on TV shows, including Ancient Aliens, America's Book of Secrets, Brad Meltzer's Decoded, and The Unexplained Files. From 2003 to 2015, Lear was a regular guest on Coast to Coast AM. Lear sold "official John Lear tin foil hats" to fans.

Lear's claims left a lasting influence on the UFO movement—one author observed "in the early years [UFO writers] did not, by and large, embrace strong political positions. Cooper and Lear were the tip of a spear asserting that the number one thing we had to fear was not little green men, but the government that colluded with them, appropriating their technology against us."

== Personal life and death ==
Lear's first wife was Marcelle Tagand Lear, who later divorced him and married actor Adam West.

In 1970, Lear married Marilee Higginbotham, owner of a California fashion modelling agency, at a ceremony in Pacific Palisades, Los Angeles.

Lear died on March 29, 2022, at the age of 79.

== See also ==
- Fred Crisman, promoter of the Maury Island hoax
- Carl Meredith Allen, promoter of the Philadelphia Experiment hoax
- Richard C. Doty, promoter of the Majestic 12 hoax
