= Majestic 12 =

Purported organization that appears in UFO conspiracy theories

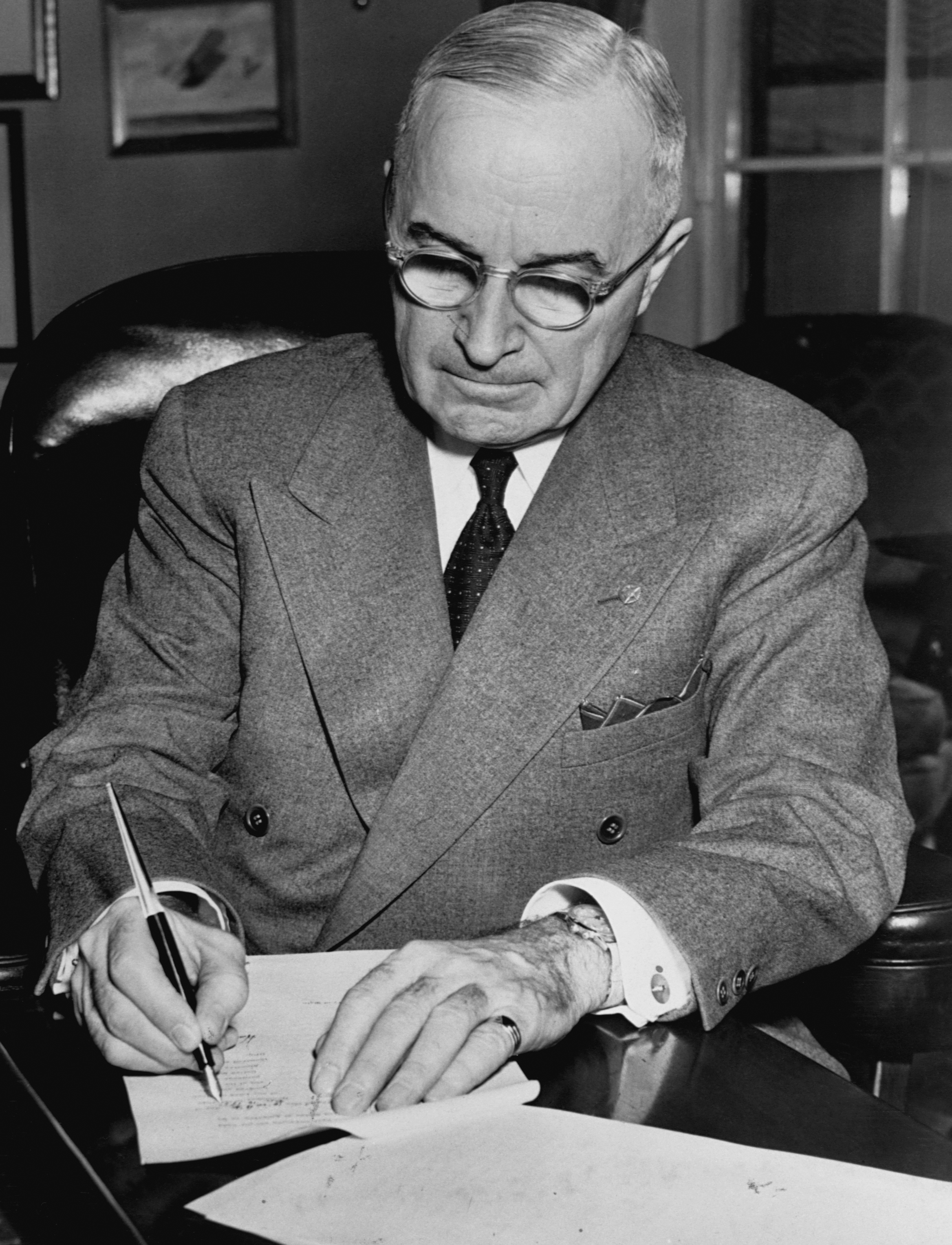
Ufologists claim that Harry S. Truman formed the Majestic 12 in 1947

Majestic 12, also known as Majic-12, and MJ-12 for short, is a purported organization that appeared in fake documents first circulated by ufologists in 1984, and that some UFO conspiracy theories still claim to have existed. The organization is claimed to be the code name of an alleged secret committee of scientists, military leaders, and government officials, formed in 1947 by an executive order by U.S. President Harry S. Truman to facilitate recovery and investigation of alien spacecraft.

"MJ-12" first entered UFO culture in the early 1980s as part of a deception campaign against amateur researchers who linked unexplained livestock deaths to UFO reports. By the mid-80s, manufactured papers called the "MJ-12 documents" were anonymously and mysteriously provided to UFO researchers. The documents were largely revealed to be forgeries, sometimes drawn from actual 1940s-era historical documents unrelated to UFOs. Starting in 1989, elements in the deception campaign confessed to fabricating MJ-12 lore to deceive UFO researches. The Federal Bureau of Investigation (FBI) declared the documents to be "completely bogus", and many ufologists consider them to be an elaborate hoax.

Despite its origin in deception and fraud, the name "Majestic 12" remains popular among some UFO conspiracy theorists and the concept has appeared in popular culture including television, film, video games, and literature.

== Origin of MJ-12 claims ==
Majestic 12 was the purported organization behind faked government documents delivered anonymously to multiple ufologists in the 1980s. (Note: The MJ-12 organization is given several similar names. The Shandera document called it "Majestic-12 (Majic-12)". Pratt and Moore used "Majik 12" while working on their novel. The earliest Bennewitz memo called it "MJ Twelve". Milton William Cooper called it "Majesty Twelve".) All individuals who received the fake documents were connected to Bill Moore.

The concept of "Majestic 12" emerged during a period in the 1980s when ufologists believed there had been a cover-up of the Roswell incident and speculated some secretive upper tier of the U.S. government was responsible.

After the publication of Moore's book The Roswell Incident, Richard C. Doty and other individuals presenting themselves as Air Force Intelligence Officers approached Moore. They used the unfulfilled promise of hard evidence of extraterrestrial retrievals to recruit Moore, who kept notes on other ufologists and intentionally spread misinformation within the UFO community.

The earliest known reference to "MJ Twelve" comes from a 1981 document used in disinformation targeting Paul Bennewitz. Bennewitz was a enterpreneur-government contractor turned UFO researcher who came to believe craft from US airbases were linked to unexplained livestock deaths, or "cattle mutilations". Bennewitz was contacted by Air Force officials including Richard C. Doty. Collectively, they mislead Bennewitz. By 1988, Bennewitz was accusing his wife of being in control of the extraterrestrials and he required psychiatric hospitalization.

=== 1980s ===
In 1982, Bob Pratt worked with Doty and Moore on The Aquarius Project, an unpublished science fiction manuscript about the purported organization. Moore had initially planned to do a nonfiction book but lacked evidence. During a phone call about the manuscript, Moore explained to Pratt that his goal was to "get as much of the story out with as little fiction as possible." That same year, Moore, Friedman, and Jaime Shandera began work on a KPIX-TV UFO documentary, and Moore shared the original "MJ Twelve" memo mentioning Bennewitz. KPIX-TV contacted the Air Force, which noted many style and formatting errors; Moore admitted that he had typed and stamped the document as a facsimile. The name "Majestic 12" had been prefigured in the UFO community when Bill Moore asked National Enquirer reporter Bob Pratt in 1982 to collaborate on a novel initially called MAJIK-12 and eventually changed by Moore to The Aquarius Project. Because of this, Pratt was suspicious of the authenticity of the Majestic 12 documents.

On January 10-11, 1983, Doty and Moore met with attorney and UFO researcher Peter Gersten. Doty told Gersten of a top-level government called "MJ-12" he claimed has been studying UFOs and retrieving alien craft that U. S. radar caused to crash. Doty claimed entities, alive and dead, have been retrieved at alien craft crash sites. According to Doty, the government and ETs have made an agreement whereby the aliens could conduct animal mutilations and human abductions in exchange for teaching U.S. experts about alien advanced technologies.

On March 20, 1983, Gerstein related Doty's claims to cattle mutiliation documentarian Linda Moulton Howe. Howe arranged to visit Doty in Albuquerque on April 9. At that meeting, Doty told Howe that the MJ-12 story was true, and showed Howe unspecified documents purporting to prove the existence of small, gray humanoid aliens originating from the Zeta Reticuli star system. Doty reportedly promised to supply Howe with film footage of UFOs and an interview with an alien being, although no footage ever materialized.

== Documents ==
The MJ-12 documents refer to several batches of documents provided anonymously to UFO researchers: a 1984 roll of film sent to Jaime Shandera, a 1985, a memo planted in the National Archives found after an anonymous tip, a 1994 roll of film sent to Don Berliner, and over 100 documents given to Tim Cooper. The various purported memos existed only as copies of photographs of documents.

Purported MJ-12 documents
| Source | Title | Date | Debunking evidence |
|---|---|---|---|
| Anonymous roll of film Delivered to Jaime Shandera, December 1984 | Eisenhower Briefing Document (EBD) | Nov. 18, 1952 | Cites forged Truman-Forrestal memo |
| Anonymous roll of film Delivered to Jaime Shandera, December 1984 | Truman-Forrestal Memo (TFM) | Sept. 24, 1947 | Forged signature including scratches |
| Planted in archive, Found by Moore and archivist in 1985 | Cutler-Twining Memo (CTM) | July 14, 1954 | Archival evidence, Cutler was out of the country |
| Anonymously provided to Tim Cooper | Marshall-Humelsine letter (MHL) | Sept.27, 1947 | Near-verbatim copy of 1944 Marshall-Dewey letter with "Magic" changed to "Majik" |
| Anonymously provided to Tim Cooper | Hillenkoetter-Truman letter | Feb. 17, 1948 | Based on letter from Marshall to Roosevelt. |
| Anonymous roll of film Delivered to Don Berliner, March 1994 | Special Operations Manual (SOM) | April 1954 | |
| given to Tim Cooper | Over 100 misc documents | | |

On December 11, 1984, Shandera received an anonymous package containing an undeveloped roll of film just after a phone call from Moore. The documents were found on an undeveloped roll of 35 mm film in a brown paper package that had been dropped through Shandera's mail slot. The package bore no additional information other than a New Mexico postmark. When developed, the roll of film was found to contain an image of a "Truman-Forestall memo", a "Top Secret" memorandum from President Truman to Defense Secretary James Forrestal, dated September 24, 1947, authorizing him and Dr. Vannevar Bush to proceed with Operation Majestic-12; and the Eisenhower Briefing Document, a seven page "Top Secret/Eyes Only" Majestic-12 document used to brief President-Elect Eisenhower, dated November 18, 1952.

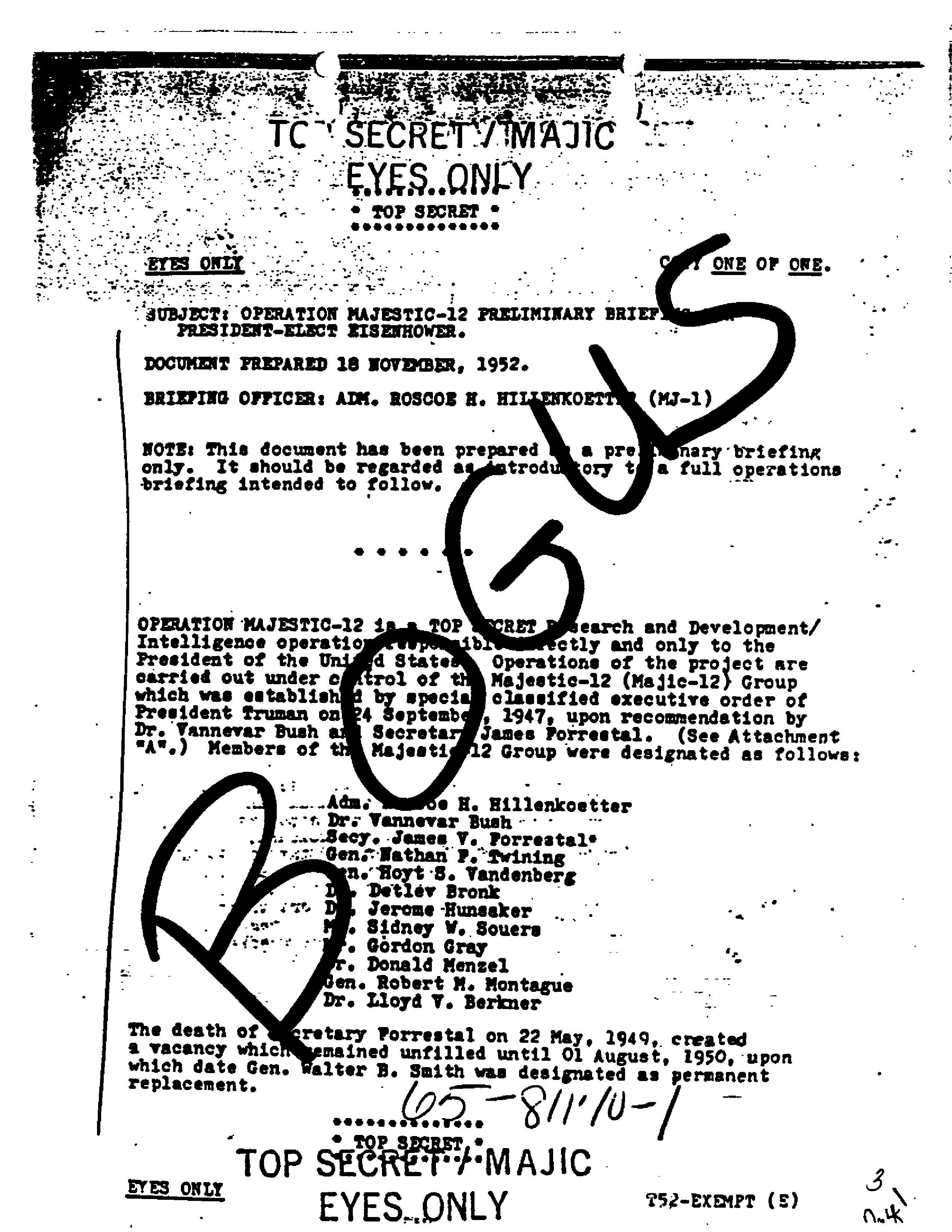
First page of the alleged Majestic 12 memo with FBI markings

On September 15, 1988, a special agent at the United States Air Force Office of Special Investigations (OSI) contacted the Dallas branch of the FBI after receiving the Majestic 12 document from an individual at an unnamed school who claimed to have received it in the mail. The FBI then began its own investigation of the supposed "secret" document and quickly formed doubts as to its authenticity. After receiving information from the OSI on November 30 of that year that no such committee had ever been authorized or formed, the FBI declared that the document was "completely bogus". The Director of the FBI subsequently instructed the Dallas office to close their investigation.

Researchers noted that the idiosyncratic date format was not found in government documents from the time they were purported to originate, but was widely used in Moore's personal notes. Some signatures appear to be photocopied from other documents. For example, a signature from President Harry Truman is identical to one from an October 1, 1947 letter to Vannevar Bush. Klass noted that the Truman signature was "a pasted-on photocopy of a genuine signature—including accidental scratch marks—from a memo that Truman wrote to Vannevar Bush on October 1, 1947".

In addition to the Roswell incident, the "Eisenhower Briefing Document" also mentioned a second crash in 1950. This second alleged crash was in Mexico, near the towns of El Indio and Guerrero along the Mexico–US border. Tom Deuley investigated the Guerrero claim for MUFON, but found no evidence for a reported UFO crash.

The following individuals were described in the Eisenhower Briefing Document as "designated members" of Majestic 12.

- Lloyd Berkner
- Detlev Bronk
- Vannevar Bush
- James Forrestal
- Gordon Gray
- Roscoe H. Hillenkoetter
- Jerome Clarke Hunsaker
- Donald H. Menzel
- Robert M. Montague
- Sidney Souers
- Nathan F. Twining
- Hoyt Vandenberg

=== Cutler/Twining memo ===
Shandera and his ufologist colleagues Stanton T. Friedman and Bill Moore say they later received a series of anonymous messages that led them to find what has been called the "Cutler/Twining memo" (Note: Not to be confused with the Twining memo of 1947 establishing Project Sign.) in 1985 while searching declassified files in the National Archives. Purporting to be written by President Eisenhower's assistant Robert Cutler to General Nathan F. Twining and containing a reference to Majestic 12, the memo is widely held to be a forgery, likely planted as part of a hoax. Historian Robert Goldberg wrote that the ufologists came to believe the story despite the documents being "obviously planted to bolster the legitimacy of the briefing papers".

Klass's investigation of the MJ-12 documents found that Robert Cutler was actually out of the country on the date he supposedly wrote the "Cutler/Twining memo". Klass dismissed theories that the documents were part of a disinformation campaign as "ridiculous", saying they contained numerous flaws that could never fool Soviet or Chinese intelligence. Other discrepancies noted by Klass included the use of a distinctive date format that matched one used in Moore's personal letters, and a conversation reported by Brad Sparks in which Moore confided that he was contemplating creating and releasing some hoax Top Secret documents in hopes that such bogus documents would encourage former military and intelligence officials who knew about the government's (alleged) UFO coverup to break their oaths of secrecy.

The National Archives noted they receive many inquiries about a supposed "memorandum from Robert Cutler to Gen. Nathan Twining, dated July 14, 1954. This particular document poses problems multiple reasons. It was found amongst unrelated documents. Its "Top Secret Restricted Information" marking was not in use until the Nixon administration, long after the document's supposed date of authorship. The document was made of "dictation onionskin", while authentic documents are on paper often accompanied by watermark. Contrary to memo, there was no meeting of the National Security Council on July 16. Furthermore, Cutler was "visiting overseas military installations on the day he supposedly issued this memorandum".

=== Cooper ===
UFO researcher Timothy S. Cooper claimed that he began receiving MJ12 documents from sources starting in 1992. Pflock claims that Cooper had previously been given UFO stories to crash retrieval researcher Leonard Stringfield. Pflock writes he personally suspected Cooper of authoring bogus documents and sharing them with established UFO researchers.

Later, a Cooper-provided MJ12-stamped document purported to link Marilyn Monroe's death to her supposed knowledge of UFOs. The CIA concluded the document was fraudent.

=== Berliner ===
In 1994, a document called the MJ-12 "Special Operations Manual" was anonymously provided to Don Berliner. It is also widely considered to be a fake and "a continuation of the MJ-12 myth".

== Popularization ==
On May 31, 1987, it was widely reported that British ufologist Timothy Good claimed to be in possession of 1950s-era UFO documents. The documents purported to reveal a secret committee of 12, supposedly formed in 1947 by an executive order by U.S. President Harry S. Truman, and explain how the crash of an alien spacecraft at Roswell in July 1947 had been concealed, how the recovered alien technology could be exploited, and how the U.S. should engage with extraterrestrial life in the future.

In his 1987 book Above Top Secret: The Worldwide U.F.O. Cover-up, Good was involved in the initial publication of the purported Majestic 12 documents; later, according to skeptic Phil Klass, Good questioned the authenticity of at least some of the documents. In 2007, the CIA cited Above Top Secret as one of the sources contributing to "the idea that CIA has secretly concealed its research into UFOs".

Soon, distrust and suspicion led to disagreements within the ufology community over the authenticity of the MJ-12 documents, and Moore was accused of taking part in an elaborate hoax, while other ufologists and debunkers such as Philip J. Klass were accused of being "disinformation agents".

External videos
- Friedman and Klass interview - June 24, 1987
- UFO Cover Up? Live! - October 14, 1988

On June 24, 1987, Friedman appeared on the ABC network news program Nightline opposite Klass, where he discussed the MJ-12 with anchor Ted Koppel. As early as the summer of 1987, spokesmen from the White House and National Security Council denied the existence of any organization called Majestic 12, MJ-12 or Majic-12.

On December 29, 1987, supposed government UFO insider John Lear posted a statement to ParaNet, an early bulletin board system dedicated to the paranormal, claiming knowledge of MJ-12. Lear was later characterized as "probably the most influential source" of UFO conspiracy theories in the late 1980s.

On October 14, 1988, Doty pseudonymously appeared on the syndicated television broadcast UFO Coverup? Live, which introduced many Americans to the Majestic 12 hoax. It featured the first public mention of Nevada's Area 51 as a site associated with aliens. The subject was met with laughter mid-broadcast when Doty claimed a captured grey alien was fond of strawberry ice cream.

In 1989, horror novelist-turned-"alien abductee" Whitley Strieber authored the book Majestic inspired by the MJ-12 lore.

== Hoax revealed ==
After the documents were publicized, the Majestic-12 materials were heavily scrutinized and discredited. Carl Sagan criticized the complete lack of provenance of documents "miraculously dropped on a doorstep like something out of a fairy story, perhaps 'The Elves and the Shoemaker'."

External videos
- Bill Moore addresses MUFON, July 1 1989

At a 1989 Mutual UFO Network conference, Moore confessed that he had intentionally fed fake evidence of extraterrestrials to UFO researchers, including Bennewitz. Doty later said that he gave fabricated information to UFO researchers while working at Kirtland Air Force Base in the 1980s. Roswell conspiracy proponents turned on Moore, but not the broader conspiracy theory.

Ufologists Linda Moulton Howe and Stanton T. Friedman believed the MJ-12 documents to be authentic, though Friedman was the first to provide evidence that some of the documents are clearly hoaxes. Friedman examined the documents and argued that the United States government has conspired to cover up knowledge of a crashed extraterrestrial spacecraft. In 2009, Friedman argued that the papers from Cooper were fictions, and Cooper himself reported losing all confidence in the papers he'd passed on.

In the 2010 book Mirage Men and the 2013 documentary of the same name, Richard Doty admitted to being part of an organized effort to deceive UFOs researchers including Paul Bennewitz and Linda Moulton Howe.

=== Operation Magic ===
The 1970 film Tora! Tora! Tora! names twelve individuals ("The Twelve Apostles") with access to Operation Magic codebreaking decrypts. In a pivotal scene (above),Lt. Colonel Rufus S. Bratton (E.G. Marshall) removes the president from the list, indicating information will be withheld from the White House to protect national security. The scene was noted for similarities to the later Majestic 12/Majik 12 conspiracy theory.

Many MJ-12 documents were found to be forged adaptations of documents about Operation Magic, a 1940s-era cryptanalysis effort to break Axis codes and decrypt intercepts of their messages. Kathryn S. Olmsted, a historian of conspiracy theories, notes that "other researchers denounced the MJ-12 documents as fakes. In one case, the forgers, showing an impressive command of earlier conspiracy theories, had cribbed much of Gen. George Marshall’s 1944 letter to Thomas Dewey disclosing the Pearl Harbor "Magic" intercepts, with names and dates changed and "magic" becoming "majic". Friedman noted that one supposed memo from Admiral Roscoe Hillenkoetter to President Truman, dated February 17, 1948, was actually the emulation of a letter from Marshall to Roosevelt. Both letters had previously been printed in the 1983 book The American Magic: Codes, Ciphers and the Defeat of Japan.

=== Response ===
Scientific skeptic author Brian Dunning investigated the history of the subject, and reported his findings in the 2016 Skeptoid podcast episode "The Secret History of Majestic 12". He cited ufologist Bill Moore's suspicion that, rather than a hoax perpetrated by the UFO community, the papers were actually part of a disinformation campaign of the US government meant to deflect attention from secret Air Force projects. In 2017, MuckRock contributor Emma Best similarly suggested that the papers were "government sponsored, or at least tolerated, disinformation" because the declassified FBI file on Majestic 12 does not mention any further investigation to find or prosecute the forger responsible for it.

== Sources ==
- Gulyas, Aaron John (2014). The Chaos Conundrum: Essays on UFOs, Ghosts & Other High Strangeness in Our Non-Rational and Atemporal World. Luton, Bedfordshire: Andrews UK Limited. ISBN 978-0-9916975-8-8.
- Gulyas, Aaron John (2016). Conspiracy Theories: the Roots, Themes and Propagation of Paranoid Political and Cultural Narratives. Jefferson, North Carolina: McFarland. ISBN 978-1-4766-2349-8.
- Kloor, Keith (2019). "UFOs Won't Go Away". Issues in Science and Technology. 35 (3): 39–56. JSTOR 26949023.
- Korff, Kal (1997a). The Roswell UFO Crash: What They Don't Want You to Know (First ed.). Amherst, New York: Prometheus Books. ISBN 978-1-57392-127-5.
- Moore, Bill; Pratt, Bob (2007) [9 July 1982]. "Pratt Sensitive" (PDF) (Transcript of tape-recorded conversation). Archived from the original (PDF) on February 27, 2008.
- Sagan, Carl (1997). The Demon-Haunted World (Paperback ed.). London: Headline. ISBN 978-0-7472-5156-9.
