= Bob Lazar =

American businessman and UFO conspiracy theorist

Robert Lazar
- Born: Robert Scott Lazar circa 1959; Coral Gables, Florida, U.S.
- Other name: "Dennis"
- Occupations: Film processor Owner of United Nuclear Scientific Equipment and Supplies
- Known for: UFO conspiracy theories including Area 51
- Criminal charges: Pandering
- Spouse(s): Carol (1980–1986); Tracy (1986–div. Jul 25 1990); Joy White (m. 2000)

Robert Scott Lazar (/ləˈzɑːr/) is an American conspiracy theorist who claims to have been briefly employed by a classified US government project to reverse engineer extraterrestrial technology. Lazar has provided no evidence of alien life or technology, and his claims about his education and employment history are replete with fabrications. As well as being dismissed by skeptics, Lazar has been denounced by some ufologists.

After graduating high school and taking some junior college classes, Lazar began work processing photographs. He owned and operated a "one hour photo" store in New Mexico and later did photo-developing work in Las Vegas. There, in 1988, he met and befriended influential UFO conspiracist John Lear. Through Lear and his associates, Lazar learned of conspiracy theories alleging aliens were linked to the Nevada test site known as Area 51. Lear and Lazar made multiple nighttime trips to the Groom Lake region in March–April 1989, looking for UFO "test flights".

In May 1989, Lazar gave his first public interview claiming to have done secret UFO-related work at a site near Area 51. Lazar claims that during his supposed employment, which he said ran from December to April, he was taken to the site a handful of times. Lazar claims he was shown government briefing documents describing alien involvement in human affairs over the past 10,000 years. Lazar further claimed to hold multiple advanced degrees from top-level universities—educational claims that were quickly and roundly debunked.

Lazar's credibility was further eroded in 1990 when he was arrested and pleaded guilty for organizing an illegal Nevada prostitution operation. Lazar again faced legal troubles in 2006 when his mail-order supply company was charged with violated laws prohibiting the sale of chemicals across state lines.

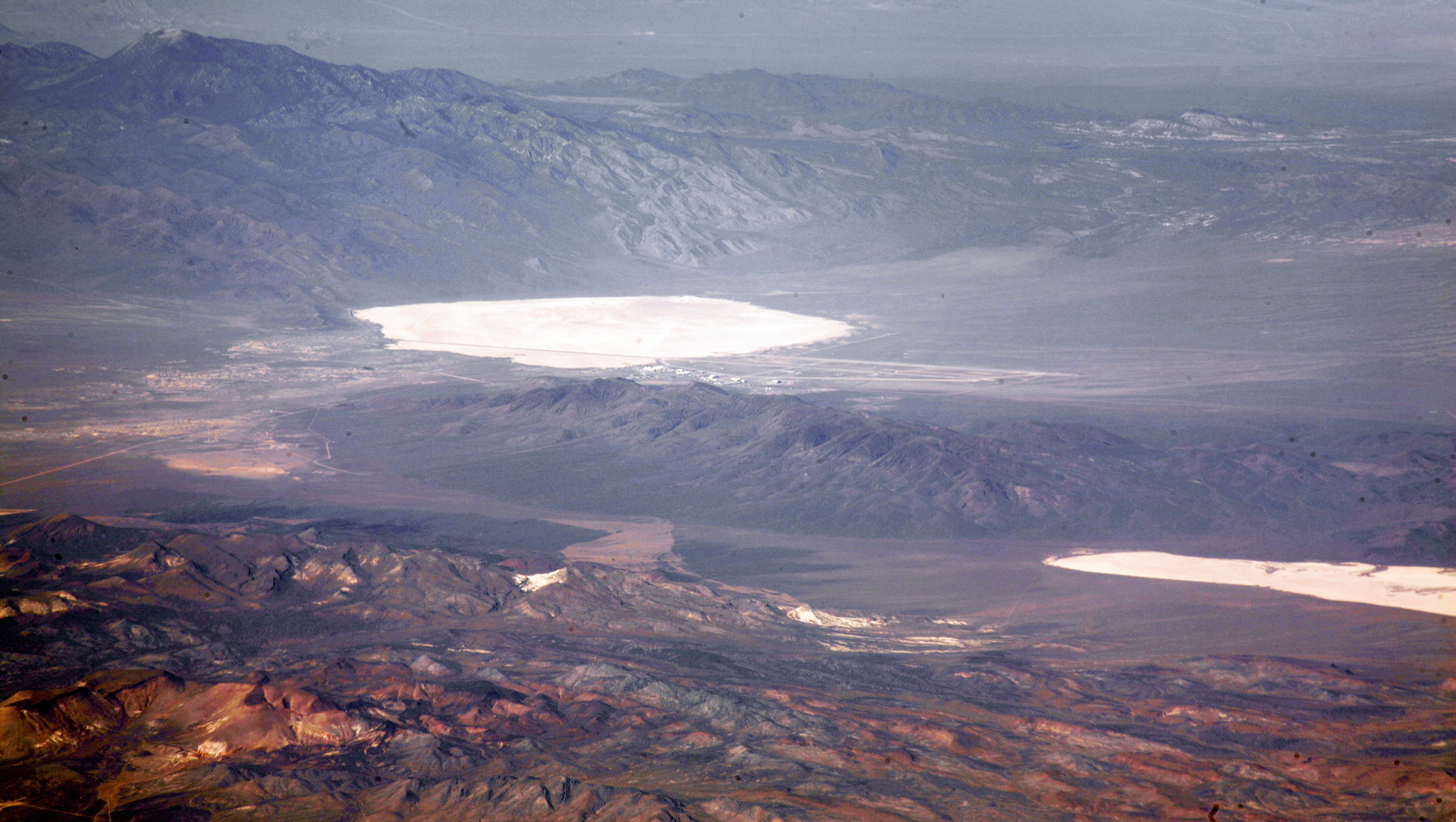
Groom Lake (left) and Papoose Lake (right)

== Early life ==
Bob Lazar attended junior college in Los Angeles before moving to Los Alamos. He later resettled in Las Vegas and claimed to have briefly worked at Groom Lake ("Area 51")

Bob Lazar grew upon on Long Island before moving to Los Angeles. He briefly worked as a technician in Los Alamos before becoming a self-employed film processor and moving to Las Vegas.

Lazar was reportedly born on January 26, 1959, in Coral Gables, Florida. He was reportedly adopted and grew up in Westbury, Long Island, New York. In August 1976, Lazar graduated from W. Tresper Clarke High School, in Westbury.

After graduation, he and family moved to Woodland Hills, Los Angeles. There, he attended Pierce Junior College. After his 1990 conviction, Lazar told authorities he had obtained a Bachelor of Science degree in "Physics and Electronic Technology" from a "correspondence college" called Pacifica University; the organization was actually a diploma mill which sold degrees for $1,400 until its founder's arrest and conviction in 1978.

On July 28, 1980, Lazar married his first wife, Carol Nadine Asher (b. March 21, 1942) in Woodland Hills.

In May 1982, Lazar and wife Carol moved to Los Alamos, New Mexico. In July 1982, local press reported on Lazar and his wife's experiences owning a Honda with a jet engine. The story was picked up by the AP wire. Its author, Terry England, later admitted to uncritically reporting Lazar's claims without verifying them.

By October 1983, Lazar and his wife operated a "one-hour photo" processing shop in Los Alamos named "Studio West". A second location, named "Film West" was open by May 1985, with both sites also serving as unofficial drop-off locations for outgoing UPS and Federal Express packages. In June 1985, Lazar and wife Carol purchased a home in Las Vegas. In early April 1986, Lazar closed the shop on short notice. Two dozen unsent UPS packages and multiple trays of processed film were found in the abandoned store.

On April 19, 1986, Lazar married a second wife, Tracy, in Vegas; Darlington alleges he was still married to first wife Carol at the time of his second marriage. Carol died by suicide two days later, using carbon monoxide from vehicle exhaust, with Lazar reportedly finding her body. Months later, on July 21, Lazar, who at the time described himself as a self-employed film processor, filed for bankruptcy citing "loss of spouse" as a factor. On October 12, Lazar and Tracy had a second wedding ceremony, this one in which she used the name "Jackie Dianne Evans".

Lazar and wife Tracy operated a photo-processing business out of their home in Las Vegas, catering to the local real estate industry. Lazar reportedly became known as "Bob the photo guy" among local appraisers including one named Gene Huff – who would become one of Lazar's closest associates.

== Relationship with John Lear ==
External media

Images
- Lear and Lazar, 1988-1989 photos

Audio
- Lear and Lazar interview, Coast-to-Coast AM 1992

Video
- Footage of Lear and Lazar visiting Groom Lake

In 1988, Lazar met and befriended influential UFO conspiracy figure John Lear. Lear cultivated similar relationships with Bill Cooper and Phil Schneider, who both later claimed to be UFO insiders after befriending Lear. After their meeting, Lazar developed an interest in UFOs and began claiming to be a UFO insider.

Since 1987, Lear had publicly claimed alien technology was being tested at the Nevada Test site "Area 51", near Groom Lake. Lazar was again exposed to that theory when the pair watched the two-hour documentary UFO Cover Up? Live which aired in syndication on October 4, 1988. In the film, Air Force special agent Richard C. Doty was interviewed, clad in shadow using the pseudonym "Falcon". Bill Moore, who had been recruited by Doty to spread misinformation to UFOlogists, was similarly featured in the program. The broadcast claimed that "Area 51" was linked to extraterrestrials from "Zeta Reticuli"—claims that would be repeated by Lear and Lazar for decades to come.

In November 1988, Lear travelled with aviation journalist Jim Goodall to Groom Lake, the "outskirts" of Area 51. The following March and April, Lear returned to Groom Lake with Bob Lazar and Gene Huff, where they filmed themselves and reportedly-saw supposed extraterrestrial UFO flights. Lear introduced Lazar to his associate, television investigative journalist George Knapp. On May 15, 1989, Knapp interviewed Lazar, clad in shadow using the pseudonym "Dennis". Introduced as a "local scientist", Lazar claimed Groom Lake held "nine flying saucers... of extraterrestrial origin".

== Claims ==
"Lazar's claims were later disproven (by UFO skeptics and believers alike). He was found to have fabricated not only his employment at Nellis but indeed his entire background; almost nothing of what he said was true. Still, Lazar's lies propelled Area 51 into the public's consciousness."

— Benjamin Radford, Live Science

Lazar has put foreword a number of unsubstantied biographical claims which have been roundly disputed or refuted by mainstream scholarship.

In 1982, Lazar claimed to be "a physicist" with the Los Alamos National Laboratory while mainstream sources conclude he was actually a technician-employee of a lab subcontractor, for less than a year. By 1990, he claimed to have post-graduate degrees from CalTech and MIT, while modern scholarship concludes no such degrees exist. Lazar also claims to have been briefly employed by a top-secret program to study extraterrestrial spacecraft at "Area 51" or "S-4", starting in December 1988.

=== Employment ===
In 1982, Lazar was briefly employed in Los Alamos as technician for a government subcontractor named Kirk-Mayer. In a later media appearance, Lazar recalled being having hired to work as a technician in Los Alamos.

While Lazar was living in Los Alamos, local press interviewed him in a human interest piece about his unique car: a Honda Civic with a small jet engine bolted into it. Primitive, homemade jet engines were a popular tech-hobbist project in the 1970s and 80s, with creation instructions available in widely published magazines. The article noted Lazar's small jet engine lacked power to actually "get the car going from a dead stop"—instead the car was driven normally, using its ordinary automotive internal combustion engine. (Note: This was a story by Los Alamos Monitor journalist Terry England, which circulated regionally via the Associated Press.)

In that 1982 automotive human-interest article, Lazar described himself as a "physicist". The author, local journalist Terry England, took Lazar's claims at face value and did not fact-check his self-identified status as "physicist".

After Lazar achieved public notoriety as an Area 51 conspiracy theorist in 1989, (Note: Sources describing Lazar as a "conspiracy theorist": Publications on conspiracy theories that detail Lazar's claims:) investigators cast doubt on Lazar's claimed status as "physicist". They found that the Los Alamos facility retained no records on Lazar, whom Prothero states was "in short, rather a minor player". A 1982 telephone directory of Los Alamos National Laboratory lists Bob Lazar as employee of subcontractor Kirk-Mayer, which supplied technicians to the lab. Lazar claimed he later worked as a physicist there "after a few years as technician", but a February 1983 directory showed no entry for Lazar, suggesting his employment had ended after less than 9 months.

The Smithsonian, along with various other mainstream news outlets, have stated that his designation as a "physicist" is self-proclaimed. (Note: The Smithsonian, and various mainstream outlets, have noted Lazar's "physicist" designation as either "self-proclaimed" or "self-described".) Some media outlets have since dubbed him a "physicist". (Note: See:)

=== Area 51 ===
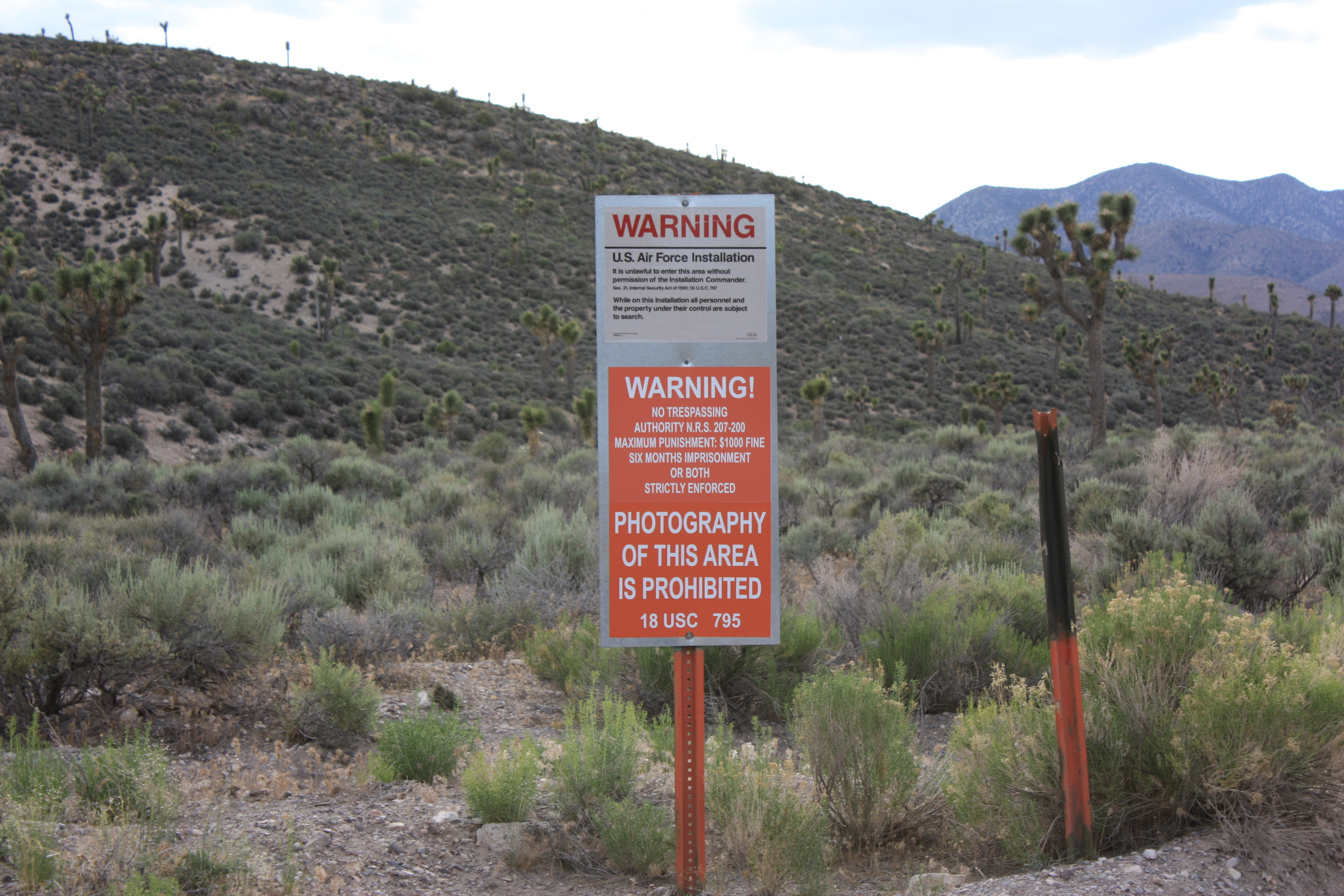
An Area 51 gate

Lazar claims that shortly after meeting UFO conspiracy figure John Lear, he was recruited for employment at "S-4", a subsidiary facility he claimed exists near the Nellis Air Force Base installation known as Area 51. Lazar says he visited the installation several times before he was terminated in March or April. Lazar said that his job was to help with the reverse engineering of one of nine flying saucers, which he alleged were extraterrestrial in origin. Lazar recalled most of his time was spent reading or being briefed. He claims one of the flying saucers, the one he coined the "Sport Model", was manufactured out of a metallic substance similar in appearance and touch to liquid titanium. In a subsequent interview that November, Lazar appeared unmasked and under his own name, where he claimed that his job interview for work at the facility was with contractor EG&G and that his employer was the United States Navy. EG&G stated it had no records on him. (Note: According to spotlight by KLAS-TV: The schools in which Lazar claims to have studied "say they've never heard of him" (6:05); Lazar alleges he worked at Los Alamos, "where he experimented with the world's largest particle beam accelerators" (6:13); George Knapp: Los Alamos officials say they had no records of him ever working there (6:25); George Knapp: "they were either mistaken or were lying: a 1982 phonebook from the lab lists Lazar right there among the other scientists and technicians" (news section shows the cover of a Los Alamos national laboratory phone directory, and then a list of names which includes "Lazar Robert") (6:30); Los Alamos Monitor article of 1982 is shown, the date reading Sunday, June 2X (low resolution), 1982, with the title "LA man joins the jet set – at 200 miles an hour" with a picture of a man with a car, with Knapp saying that it "profiles Lazar and his interest in jet-cars". It zooms in on the clipping to an excerpt which states: "It's not the car so much that's important. To Lazar, a physicist at the Los Alamos Meson Physics Facility, the important thing is the jet engine. It's something he's been working on for years. It started 'awhile ago' when working with another researcher in NASA on the technology." (6:39); George Knapp: "we called Los Alamos again. An exasperated official told us he still had no records on Lazar. EG&G, which is where Lazar says he was interviewed for the job at S4, also has no records." (6:48); The news section cuts to Lazar who claims he called the schools he attended, the hospital he was born in, and his past job to get records, but to no avail. (7:00); Lazar alleges his employer at S4 was the US Navy. (7:21)) His supposed employment at a Nellis Air Force Base subsidiary has also been discredited by skeptics, as well as by the United States Air Force.

=== Element 115 ===
In May 1989, popular magazine Scientific American discussed the possibility of stable, superheavy elements—six months later, beginning with a December 9, 1989 interview with George Knapp, Lazar claimed that the studied vehicle was fueled by such a stable, superheavy element with atomic number 115 (Element 115). Lazar noted that "science today theorizes that up around Element 113 to 116 -- somewhere in there -- [elements] should again become stable.". In that 1989 interview, Lazar argued an element with 115 protons could never be artificially synthesized but in 2003, scientists successfully synthesized it, naming it "Moscovium". Contrary to Lazar's claim, isotopes of element 115 are highly unstable, decaying in a few hundred milliseconds.

=== Education ===
After becoming a UFO conspiracy figure, Lazar explained his supposed recruitment by claiming to have previously obtained master's degrees in physics from the Massachusetts Institute of Technology (MIT) and in electronics from the California Institute of Technology (Caltech). However, both universities show no record of him. Lazar alleges that his employment and education records have been erased, an allegation that Friedman, Prothero and author Timothy D. Callahan consider implausible.

Pressed during 1993 Q&A before a live audience, Lazar was unable to supply the names of any lecturers or fellow students from his alleged tenures at MIT and Caltech. He named one figure, "Duxler", as having taught him at Caltech; William Duxler confirmed Lazar took one course from him, but Duxler was located at Pierce Junior College and had never taught at MIT or Caltech. Friedman asserted, "Quite obviously, if one can go to MIT, one doesn't go to Pierce. Lazar was at Pierce at the very same time he was supposedly at MIT more than 2,500 miles away."

Lazar similarly claimed to have graduated a Southern California high school at the early age of 15, but in fact, Lazar had graduated a New York high school, late, in the bottom third of his class. The only science course he took was a chemistry class. Scientists Stanton T. Friedman and Donald R. Prothero have stated that nobody with Lazar's high school performance record would be accepted by either institution.

== Response ==
Lazar's story has drawn significant media attention, controversy, supporters, and detractors. Lazar has presented no actual evidence of alien life or technology.

In 1995, Lazar's claims appeared to be partially-corroborated by UFO theorist Phil Schneider. After his death in 1996, Schneider's former wife revealed he had suffered from paranoid schizophrenia. Author Greg Valdez argues Schneider was directly influenced by John Lear. Writes Valdez: "In the mid-90s Phil started making claims that he was involved in the firefight at Dulce. The key to this mess is the fact that Bob Lazar popularized the story in 1989. Bob Lazar and John Lear were also working together a lot that year... Schneider more than likely obtained the story from Lear, which Lear supports in statements he’s made... If you view the Phil Schneider story from a legal standard of preponderance of evidence or beyond a reasonable doubt, there is no evidence to support his story... Based on this lack of evidence and the cumulative issues about Phil, the Phil Schneider story about Dulce is not credible, and neither are the stories of alien/government firefights, especially in light of where these stories originated from: John Lear and the air force.... Since Phil did not enter the Dulce story until the mid-1990s, his story has no evidentiary strength because a lot of Phil’s story had already been around the UFO community for several years. Phil also met with John Lear in Las Vegas, according to Lear’s interviews."

Writing in 2026 for Skeptic, Émile Kinley-Gauthier notes that Lazar's educational claims and criminal history led many to doubt his credibility. At the same time, Kinley-Gauthier notes that the intervening decades have cast doubt on the hypothesis that Lazar is a simple "fabulist" who conconcoted his story out of pure fantasy. Lazar's once-fringe claims of daily flights to and from Groom Lake via secure terminal are now "common knowledge", leading Gauthier to argue: "one major plank of the old dismissive posture—that he had built an outlandish story around an imaginary place—has aged badly... A fabulist could have been lucky once. He is harder to dismiss as a mere fabulist when elements of the practical architecture around his story keeps turning out to be real." However, Kinley-Gauthier is similarly skeptical of the hypothesis that Lazar is "sincere but mistaken", as that "requires a chain of error that struggles to generate the specific, constrained features of the story."

Since the mid-90s, a third hypothesis held that Lazar might have been intentionally used by the military to spread disinformation. Tom Mahood, an aerospace engineer critical of Lazar's claims, told Darlington in 1997: "I like the idea that Lazar was a patsy... Maybe he was set up; maybe the whole thing... was staged. ". The US Air Force had a history of such disinformation operations prior to Lazar, as detailed in the 2014 documentary Mirage Men where Air Force special agent Rick Doty admitted to having spread UFO disinformation by bringing individuals onto a secure military base, requesting their assistance to study UFOs, and then showing them bogus UFO documents. In June 2025, the Wall Street Journal published a story on 'Yankee Blue', a supposed campaign over decades in which hundreds of Air Force personnel were misled into believing extraterrestrials exist and a reverse-engineering program was underway. George Knapp covered the Journal's reporting, considering the possibility that Lazar's and others' legends of alien technology at Area 51 might have been intentionally created by the military.

== Media activity ==
Lazar's first named public appearance was a November 1989 episode of The Billy Goodman Happening, a late-night radio show on KVEG in Las Vegas known for covering UFOs and other supposed unexplained phenomenon. One caller during the show, Bill Cooper vouched for Lazar's genuineness and appeared to independently corroborate some of his claims; in fact, both Lazar and Cooper were associates of John Lear. Cooper would later accuse Lazar of being a fraud.

Lazar subsequently received funding from billionaire and "New Age philanthropist" Robert Bigelow. Lazar was reportedly contracted by "Zeta Reticuli 2 Incorporated" with a salary of $30,000 a year (over $75,000 a year in 2025 dollars). In 1991, he released "The Lazar Tape and Excerpts from the Government Bible", a VHS tape which was advertised directly to consumers in venues like UFO Magazine for the price of $29.95 plus $3.00 shipping (over $75 in 2025 dollars) According to Norio Hayakawa, Lazar was paid $5,000 (over $12,000 in 2025 dollars) to participate in a Japanese television event; According to Hayakawa, Lazar received the funds but never actually showed up to participate in the event. Also in early 1990, Lazar set up an illegal prostitution operation that reportedly earned $25,000 profit (over $60,000 in 2025 dollars); his victim-partner, a 46 year old sex worker, alleged she was entitled to 50% of profits but was never paid.

In 1991, he appeared on a Fox network special titled "The UFO Report: Sightings"; the special later gave rise to the paranormal-themed TV show Sightings. On December 12, 1992, Lazar was a guest on fringe late-night radio show Coast to Coast AM with host Art Bell. In 1991, a standing-room-only event was held at the UFO-themed Little A'Le'Inn in Rachel, Nevada, featuring John Lear, Bob Lazar, and Bill Cooper. On May 1, 1993, Lear and Lazar participated in an event billed "The Ultimate UFO Seminar" at the Inn. Lazar arrived in a silver corvette with custom license plate reading "MJ 12".

In 1993, Variety reported New Line Cinema had reached a deal to produce a film based on Lazar's life story.

Lazar co-operated the Desert Blast festival, an annual event in the Nevada desert for pyrotechnics enthusiasts. The festival features homemade explosives, rockets, jet-powered vehicles, and other pyrotechnics.

In 1995 and early 1996, Lazar and Gene Huff co-hosted UFO Line, a one-hour long late-night radio show on KLAV airing Friday nights at 11:00 P.M.

Lazar was featured in Knapp's and Jeremy Corbell's 2019 documentary Bob Lazar: Area 51 & Flying Saucers, During the filming of the Corbell documentary, FBI and local police executed a search warrant on Lazar's chemical supply company. While fringe speculation suggested the search was related to the filming, it was actually an investigation to determine if a murder suspect in Michigan had purchased poison from the company. Lazar was not suspected or accused of wrongdoing. That year, he has appeared on The Joe Rogan Experience. Lazar's book, titled Dreamland: An Autobiography was published in October 2019.

In 2026, he was featured in Luigi Vendittelli's documentary S4: The Bob Lazar Story.

== Criminal convictions ==
Journalists have noted that further doubts have been cast on Lazar's credibility due to his criminal activity.

In 1990, Lazar was arrested for aiding and abetting a prostitution ring. This was reduced to felony pandering, to which he pleaded guilty. Lazar reportedly installed hidden cameras in the residence used as a brothel, kept computer logs of clients, and had even obtained a list of "all license plate numbers on vehicles registered to the Las Vegas Metropolitan Police Department; he recorded them within the computers to aid in detecting any possible undercover officers securing 'dates' within the brothel". Shortly after entering his plea, Lazar and second wife Tracy divorced, on July 25, 1990. At sentencing, Lazar was ordered to do 150 hours of community service, stay away from brothels, and undergo psychotherapy.

In 2006, Lazar's supply business was charged with violating the Federal Hazardous Substances Act for shipping restricted chemicals across state lines. The charges stemmed from a 2003 raid on United Nuclear's business offices, where chemical sales records were examined. In 2007, United Nuclear pleaded guilty to three criminal counts for violating a law prohibiting the sale of chemicals and components used to make illegal fireworks; it was fined $7,500 and received three years probation as part of a plea agreement where the government agreed not to bring direct charges against Lazar or his wife.

== See also ==
- Cattle mutilation
- Fred Crisman, promoter of Maury Island hoax
- Carl Meredith Allen, promoter of Philadelphia Experiment hoax
- Mirage Men, about a U.S. military campaign to fabricate UFO folklore in order to deflect attention from classified military projects.
- UFO reports and disinformation

== Sources ==
- Lazar, Bob; Corbell, Jeremy (2018). Bob Lazar: Area 51 & Flying Saucers. The Orchard.
- Lazar, Bob; Knapp, George (2019). Dreamland: An Autobiography. Interstellar.
