= Dulce Base =

Conspiracy theory

Dulce Base is the subject of a conspiracy theory claiming that a jointly-operated human and alien underground facility exists under Archuleta Mesa near the town of Dulce, New Mexico, in the United States. Claims of alien activity there first arose from Albuquerque businessman Paul Bennewitz.

== History ==
Starting in 1979, Bennewitz became convinced he was intercepting electronic communications from alien spacecraft and installations outside of Albuquerque. Influenced by Air Force agent Richard C. Doty, Bennewitz came to believ he had discovered a secret underground base near Dulce populated by grey aliens and humans. By 1983, Bennewitz's claims appeared in the popular press.

External media
- George Knapp interview of John Lear, KLAS TV 1987
- Lear lecture at Spring Valley Library, Las Vegas, 1988
- Statement by John Lear (rev. August 25, 1988) hosted by the Internet Sacred Text Archive

The story spread rapidly within the UFO community and by 1987, UFOlogist John Lear claimed he had independent confirmations of the base's existence. Lear's statement influenced Thomas Allen LeVesque, pen name "Jason Bishop III", who later admitted to fabricating stories about Dulce Base.

In 1986, George Clinton Andrews discussed Dulce Base legends in his book Extra-Terrestrials Among Us. On September 20, 1988, the tabloid Weekly World News published a story entitled "UFO base found in New Mexico" which claimed that "diabolical invaders from another solar system have set up a secret underground base in the rugged mountains of northern New Mexico – so they can shanghai human guinea pigs for bizarre genetic experiments". The Weekly World News story used supposed quotes from UFOlogist Leonard H. Stringfield as a source for its claims. Upon learning of the story, Stringfield protested, "I never read such a distortion of facts in my life".

== Influences ==
Political scientist Michael Barkun wrote that Cold War underground missile installations in the area gave superficial plausibility to the rumors, making the Dulce base story an "attractive legend" within UFOlogy. According to Barkun, claims about experiments on abductees and firefights between aliens and the Delta Force place the Dulce legend "well outside even the most far-fetched reports of secret underground bases."

Residents of Dulce claim to have seen UFOs, strange moving lights, and other unexplained sightings in the area. Jicarilla Apache Legislative Council president Ty Vicenti "has embraced the notion of a Dulce Base, partly in a push to stimulate tourism"; n 2016, the town hosted the Dulce Base UFO Conference at the local casino hotel.

Dulce Base legends have been noted for their similarity to the Shaver Mystery. In the mid-1940s, welder Richard Shaver began writing letters to science-fiction editor Raymond A. Palmer, who published them in various pulp outlets. Shaver told of malevolent subterranean beings ("deros") who pilot disc-shaped spaceships. Palmer biographer Fred Nadis "specifically highlights the tales of the supposed underground base near Dulce, New Mexico, as a prominent inheritor of the Shaver/Palmer tradition, characterizing Paul Bennewitz’s stories of alien experimentation as 'a dero scene right out of a Shaver story.'"
