= George Knapp =

George Knapp is the name of:

- Georg Christian Knapp (1753–1825), German Protestant theologian
- Georg Friedrich Knapp (1842–1926), German economist
- George Owen Knapp (1855–1945), American industrialist
- George Knapp (television journalist) (born 1952), American journalist
- George Knapp (MP) (1754–1809), British Member of Parliament for Abingdon, banker and grocer
