= The Age of Disclosure =

2025 American UFO documentary film

- Release poster
- Directed by: Dan Farah
- Produced by: Dan Farah
- Narrated by: Luis Elizondo
- Cinematography: Vincent Wrenn
- Edited by: Spencer Averick; Colin Frederick
- Music by: Blair Mowat
- Production company: Farah Films
- Release dates: March 9, 2025 (SXSW); November 21, 2025 (Theatrical and Amazon Prime Video)
- Running time: 109 minutes
- Country: United States
- Language: English

The Age of Disclosure is a 2025 American documentary film about UFOs directed and produced by Dan Farah, in which a number of former United States government officials and people associated with the disclosure movement assert that alien intelligence is present on Earth and has been subject to a decades-long government cover-up. Farah described "disclosure" as when governments could reveal withheld information about alien life, as described in UFO conspiracy theory claims. The film advances conspiracy theories concerning recovered alien materials, secret programs, and institutional secrecy by highlighting interviews with a wide ranging selection of participants including ufologists along with former and current U. S. government officials and employees from the U. S. military, the U. S. intelligence community, and the U. S. Congress.

The film premiered at the 2025 South by Southwest Film & TV Festival on March 9, 2025. It was released in theaters and on Amazon Prime Video on November 21, 2025, becoming the highest-grossing documentary of all time on the platform. It received mixed reviews from critics, with scientists and skeptical commentators pointing out the lack of any physical evidence for the claims made in the film, and the film's credulous over-reliance on eyewitness testimony.

== Synopsis ==
Age of Disclosure includes interviews with former and present United States elected, military, and intelligence officials, along with ufologists, government associates, and fringe scientists who claim, in some cases for decades, that the U. S. government has been aware of alien life and retrieving their technology since 1947 if not before. Variety reported that according to director Farah, the "disclosure" concept in the film’s title refers to a hypothetical future time when governments would reveal to the public withheld information about aliens and UFOs, a pillar of some UFO conspiracy theories.

Former U. S. Department of Defense employee Luis Elizondo narrates the film and says that he was assigned to the Advanced Aerospace Threat Identification Program (AATIP) in 2009. Elizondo with AATIP engineer consultant and parapsychologist Harold E. Puthoff and his collaborator Eric Davis, allege, among other claims, that they discovered a secret government "Legacy Program" that investigated and concealed evidence of extraterrestrial intelligence for more than 80 years. Jay Stratton, the former director of the Unidentified Aerial Phenomena Task Force (UAPTF) who also appeared on the American reality TV series, The Secret of Skinwalker Ranch, claims there is a race among governments to reverse engineer alien technology, and compares it to the Manhattan Project to develop nuclear weapons in World War II.

The film features current U. S. Secretary of State and acting National Security Advisor Marco Rubio, members of the United States Congress, including Kirsten Gillibrand and Mike Rounds of the Senate, along with Tim Burchett, André Carson, Dan Crenshaw, Mike Gallagher and Anna Paulina Luna of the House of Representatives. Former intelligence community and military officials interviewed about their alleged UFO-related experiences include James Clapper, former Director of National Intelligence; Christopher C. Miller, former acting Secretary of Defense; Christopher Mellon, former Deputy Assistant Secretary of Defense for Intelligence; and retired Rear Admiral Tim Gallaudet, former commander of the Naval Meteorology and Oceanography Command.

Military fighter pilots connected with the Pentagon UFO videos and reports are interviewed, including U. S. Navy pilots David Fravor, Alex Dietrich, Ryan Graves, as well as former U. S. Air Force pilot and NORAD director, Colonel James D. Cobb. Graves and Brett Feddersen, formerly of the United States National Security Council and a director at the Federal Aviation Administration, discuss aviation safety concerns related to UFOs.

Retired U. S. Army colonel and Northrop Grumman executive Karl Nell, along with members of the UAPTF, Travis S. Taylor and Mike Gold, describe experiences they say happened to them in the 2010s. Garry Nolan, an academic who takes an interest in ufology, and Mike Flaherty, a retired U. S. Navy intelligence officer, discuss their allegations of biological effects linked to UFOs. Former Air Force Lieutenant Robert Jacobs describes witnessing what he believed to be a UFO disabling a missile in 1964. Retired Air Force Captain Robert Salas recalled an incident in 1967 where a missile system malfunction allegedly coincided with a UFO report.

== Crew ==
The Age of Disclosure is the directorial debut of Dan Farah, who previously produced the science fiction film Ready Player One and the fantasy series The Shannara Chronicles. Spencer Averick was the film's editor. Blair Mowat scored The Age of Disclosure.

== Production ==
According to Farah, the film was produced in "secrecy", with minimal publicity, over three years.

== Release ==
The film was showcased at SXSW on March 9, 2025. It released on November 21, 2025, on Amazon Prime and had a limited, Oscar-qualifying release at theaters in New York, Los Angeles, and Washington, D. C.

== Reception ==
Less than 48 hours after its release on Amazon Prime Video, The Age of Disclosure "broke that platform’s record for highest-grossing documentary" according to Deadline Hollywood. According to Deadline, the documentary was "outperforming major studio titles", such as Jurassic World Rebirth and Mission: Impossible – The Final Reckoning.

=== Critical response ===
On the review aggregator website Rotten Tomatoes, 27% of 11 critics' reviews are positive. The audience "popcorn meter" rating is 93%, based on more than 500 user ratings. Metacritic, which uses a weighted average, assigned the film a score of 45 out of 100, based on five critics, indicating "mixed or average" reviews.

Writing in The Hollywood Reporter, Daniel Fienberg called the film a "sensationalistic wolf in understated sheep's clothing" and opined that "almost nothing in The Age of Disclosure is 'new,' per se" but that the quality of its production values set it apart from similar films of the genre and that "some viewers will happily celebrate the fantasy, when it looks this legitimate". Fienberg dismissed it as "a basic cable exploitation doc done up with a fancy gloss", in which "nothing is proven, and thus nothing can be refuted". On Collider, Nate Richard wrote that "as we get further into the movie, the more ridiculous it gets", that it was "executed in the most bland way possible", and that "the pacing makes the movie feel like you're watching a college PowerPoint presentation". Richard's conclusion was that: "...the movie felt like it was made to be an echo chamber for those who already believe in UFOs. If the job of The Age of Disclosure was to convert skeptics, it failed." According to The Guardian reviewer Adrian Horton, the film, while being "serious and sourced", "has drawn gasps and criticism" with claims both "provocative and controversial". Writing for The New York Times, Ben Kenigsberg concluded of the film that "anyone who sits through its nearly two hours of unprovable claims is a chump".

== Responses ==
=== Participants ===
In a December 2, 2025, episode of Hannity, host Sean Hannity opened his interview with United States Secretary of State Marco Rubio with what he said was a "fun question", asking him about The Age of Disclosure. Rubio, who appeared in the film, said he was concerned that "some adversary, another country for example, has developed some asymmetric capability for surveillance or the like for which we are not prepared," citing examples of drones or hot air balloons. Regarding how closely information was held, Rubio said:

You had people that came forward to us – some of these people were navy pilots, admirals, generals, whatever, that would come forward and say that there were programs in the U. S. Government that not even presidents were made aware of.

Addressing the film's other interview subjects, Rubio said:

We have people with very high jobs in the U. S. government that are either, A: liars, B: crazy, or C: telling the truth. And two of those three options are not good. I don't have the answers. I don't want to call them liars. I just don't have any independent way to verify the things they've said.

=== Scientists ===
Joshua Semeter, a Boston University professor of electrical engineering who was a member of the NASA Unidentified Anomalous Phenomena Independent Study Team was skeptical of the film's allegations, "I have seen no evidence that the government has been hiding anything.... [U]ltimately, testimonies are simply not enough. They need to be backed up with evidence."

=== Skeptics ===
Jason Colavito, a researcher who has documented the connection between pseudoarchaeology and UFO beliefs, wrote that the film was like "an episode of Ancient Aliens with better production values... By the time the film is over, the viewer has seen no evidence that is new, no stories that had not been told many times before".

In Skeptic magazine, Michael Shermer criticized the film's reliance on anecdotes. Shermer compared the anecdotes featured in the film to claims about Bigfoot, saying, "If all you had were stories about what you saw, and maybe a couple of out-of-focus videos and grainy photographs, no one would believe you...and for good reason!".

== See also ==
- Investigation of UFO reports by the United States government
- UFO Cover Up? Live, a 1988 TV broadcast featuring Air Force officials, who later admitted to using the program to spread disinformation
- UFOs: Past, Present, and Future, a film from 1976 noted for it similarity to the later blockbuster Close Encounters of the Third Kind
