= UFO reports and atomic sites =

Correlation between UFO reports and atomic sites

By July 6, 1947, national media speculated that disc reports were linked to atomic sites, such as the Hanford plutonium plant, Muroc Army Airfield, the White Sands Proving Ground (site of the Trinity Test and Holloman base), and the Oak Ridge uranium enrichment plant.

Since 1947, United States media coverage has speculated that UFO reports might be linked to atomic sites.

In June 1947, the start of the Cold War led to domestic UFO reports being taken seriously by both military and media. On July 6, 1947, media nationwide claimed that the ongoing "flying saucer" craze was linked to "transmutation of atomic energy", though experts later dismissed that claim as gibberish.

In 1968, Air Force debunker J. Allen Hynek, in the wake of controversy over his claim that a UFO report had been caused by swamp gas, floated the suggestion that reports might be tied to the atomic phenomenon.

By the 1990s, legends had spread of UFOs interfering with a missile test and taking a nuclear missile complex offline. In the 1964 missile test, a witness described UFO interference and was sworn to silence. It was later explained as the misidentification of then-classified decoy warheads. In 1967, a UFO sighting coincided with a missile complex malfunction. This was later explained as the result of an EMP test.

Both anecdotal observations and statistical studies suggest that UFO reports are more common near military or atomic sites. The Air Force conducted a rudimentary spatial analysis in the 1950s that seemed to confirm increased UFO reporting around "technologically interesting" sites. In 2015, French economists provided the first publicly available statistical analysis confirming that, within their dataset of sightings over France, reports of UFO were correlated with atomic sites to a highly significant degree. Experts argue that this link could simply be due to the unprecedented scrutiny of airspace around strategically important sites, while believers in extraterrestrial space visitors have long suggested that benevolent aliens were concerned about human use of atomic weapons.

== Background ==
By 1947, US national security concerns led to unprecedented scrutiny of airspace near US atomic sites and increased media coverage of UFO reports in US airspace.

=== 1940s weapons development ===
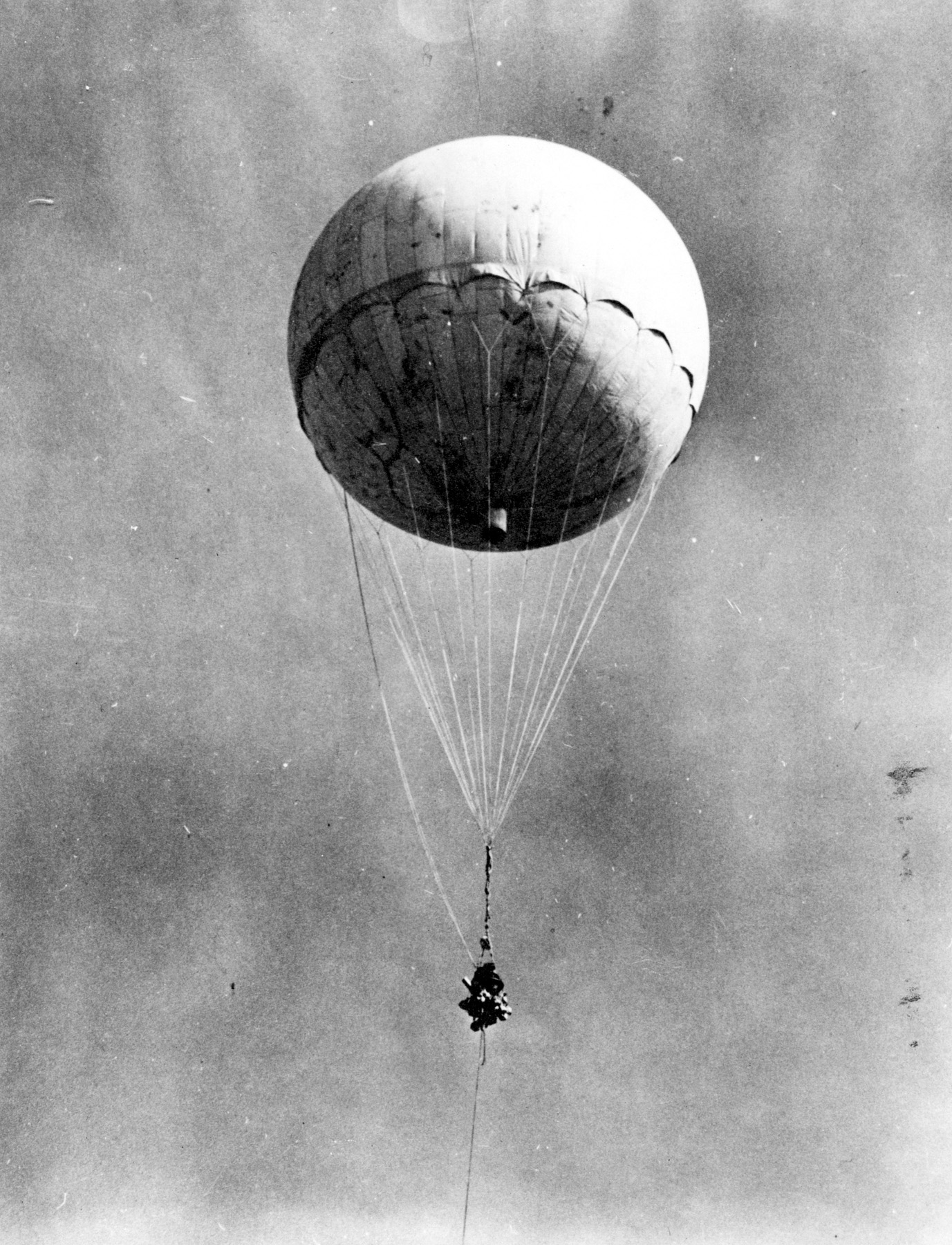
A balloon bomb launched from Japan briefly interfered with plutonium production at Hanford. A coverup prevented Japan from learning the balloons had reached the US.

Atomic weapons were developed by the US Military during World War II as a part of the Manhattan Project. Uranium enrichment was performed at Oak Ridge, Tennessee, while plutonium production took place at Hanford, Washington. Bomb design and construction took place at Los Alamos, New Mexico. As a result, air power had increased greatly in both lethality and range over the course of World War II: in the 1941 Pearl Harbor attack, 350 Japanese aircraft killed 2,500 people in a sneak attack after flying a few hundred miles, but by the 1945 bombings of Hiroshima and Nagasaki, just two American bombers killed up to 250,000 people after flying a full 1,500 miles.

During the war, Japan deployed intercontinental balloon bombs that started wildfires and in one case even took out power at the Hanford plutonium production facility; a domestic censorship campaign successfully prevented Japan from learning the weapons had, in fact, reached the United States. Inspired by the Japanese balloons, the US created their own high-flying balloons in Project Mogul, an attempt to detect potential Soviet atomic tests.

Meanwhile, Germany had developed rockets, jet fighters, and designs for an intercontinental bomber. Soviet and American governments both learned of Axis technical advances and employed Axis scientists in their race for technical superiority after the war.

=== Increased scrutiny of US airspace ===
Direct US atomic attack against Soviets had been a possibility since 1945, when the nation unveiled the first intercontinental bomber, able to reach the Soviet Union from American soil. By 1946, Army officials feared a Soviet surprise attack on US atomic facilities. Soviet bombers had developed the range to strike Hanford and still return to base, or even to strike Los Alamos or Oak Ridge in a one-way attack. Atomic sites were among the first places in the United States to operate radar, supported by spotters for visual confirmation and squadrons of fighters to defend against potential threats.

The start of the Cold War in the summer of 1947 affected how media covered reports of unidentified anomalies in the sky. In earlier eras, such reports were covered as religion, folklore, or tall tales, but the development of atomic weapons and intercontinental vehicles meant even a small number of adversarial overflights could have huge national security implications. Writing in 2020, Skeptical Inquirer author Eric Wojciechowski argued: "From all the available evidence, it appears that in 1947, the U.S. military was accepting anecdotal reports of flying saucers at face value. Perhaps they did so as a precaution to ensure no foreign threats were present. Missing something such as advanced enemy aircraft over one’s own territory could have been disastrous."

== Chronology ==
Since 1947, public discourse has linked some notable UFO incidents and atomic sites.

=== Supposed flying discs allegedly break sound barrier ===
Kenneth Arnold reported witnessing nine discs flying from Mount Rainier to Mount Adams at speeds he calculated to be supersonic. By July 6, 1947, national media suggested the relative proxmity to the Hanford plutonium plant might be significant.

Early in 1947, the Army and Navy independently announced plans to break the sound barrier before the end of the year. On June 24, Kenneth Arnold reported seeing nine objects flying between Mt. Rainier and Mt. Adams – a distance of 42 miles – in the span of 102 seconds. If Arnold's report were correct, the objects had been traveling at a supersonic rate of 1,200 miles per hours, nearly double the then-current airspeed record of 623 miles per hour.

Unlike prior stories of unexplained airborne sightings, Arnold's report was covered in media nationwide. An Army spokesman in D.C. told press that the only known object capable of those speeds was a V-2 rocket, which they argued would not be mistaken for a disc-shaped aircraft.

The sound barrier would not actually be broken for another four months, until October 11 when American test pilot Chuck Yeager piloted the rocket-propelled Bell X-1. When Aviation Magazine reported on the record-breaking flight in December 1947, the Air Force denied the claim; the Air Force would not announce the achievement until the following June.

=== Roswell and atomic weapons ===
Roswell was one of many Army airfields in New Mexico when debris was recovered from a ranch near Corona. Researchers at Alamogordo Air Field, less than 150 miles (240 km) from Roswell, were launching classified balloons during the prior weeks.

After debris was found on a Corona ranch in New Mexico, on July 8, press announced that Army Air Forces at Roswell had recovered a "flying disc". Press at the time noted the 509th at Roswell was the Army's atomic bomb group. In subsequent decades, Roswell's status as the only unit charged with atomic weapons delivery gave rise to legends that the Corona debris was linked to atomic bombers at Roswell, but Corona was actually a significant distance from Roswell, and two other Army Air Fields were closer to the debris site than Roswell.

Initially dismissed as a weather balloon, by the 1970s Air Force Officers began to admit the weather balloon story had been part of a cover-up. In the 1990s, an Air Force report concluded the debris had come from a Project Mogul balloon designed to detect Soviet atomic tests. Mogul Balloons, like the Japanese Fu-Go balloons that inspired them, were top secret.

=== First public claims of a UFO-Atomic link ===
By July 6, national media speculated that disc reports were linked to atomic sites, such as the Hanford plutonium plant, Muroc Army Airfield, and the White Sands Proving Ground (site of the Trinity Test and Holloman base).

During the 1947 craze, flying discs and atomic weaponry became linked in the public consciousness. On July 6, headlines proclaimed "Discs Atom Products, A-Bomb Scientist Says". Articles cited an unnamed "noted scientist in nuclear physics" affiliated with CalTech who had been part of the Manhattan Project. The scientist declared "People are not 'seeing things'" and said flatly that experiments in "transmutation of atomic energy" being conducted at Muroc Lake California; White Sands, New Mexico; Portland, Oregon, and elsewhere were responsible for the "flying discs". Papers observed that the "... bulk of the flying disc reports have generated in a wide circle through Idaho, Washington, and Oregon surrounding the Hanford works". Col. F. J. Clarke, commander of Hanford, denied knowledge of any connection. Harold Urey, atomic scientist in Chicago, dismissed the report as "gibberish", as did Atomic Energy Commission chair David E. Lilienthal.

During the investigation of the Maury Island Incident, supposed saucer witness Harold Dahl reported receiving an anonymous letter that speculated the flying discs were objects that had become visible due to radiation in the atmosphere.

=== Mantell crash near Oak Ridge ===
Fort Knox, charged with air defense of Oak Ridge, scrambled fighters. Mantell crashed in Franklin, Kentucky.

Fighters at Fort Knox, Kentucky were tasked with providing air defense to the Oak Ridge facility. On January 7, 1948, a flight of four fighters were dispatched to pursue a UFO. One pilot, 25-year-old Captain Thomas F. Mantell, climbed to above 22,000 feet; his wingman did not follow him as neither plane was equipped with oxygen to allow flight at that altitude. Mantell crashed to his death, presumably after having lost consciousness due to lack of oxygen. The Air Force later concluded the UFO had been a Skyhook balloon, a classified project of which Mantell would have had no knowledge.

=== Green Fireballs ===
Lincoln LaPaz reported green fireballs near the Hanford plutonium plant might be significant.

On December 5, 1948, multiple agencies met to investigate the reports by astronomer Lincoln LaPaz of green fireballs. By 1949, orders were issued for fighters to fire on any potentially hostile aircraft over Hanford or Oak Ridge. In the early days of the Korean War, pilots reported UFOs over Hanford; Hanford reports continued through 1950, later joined by similar reports over Oak Ridge. Ruppelt detailed two 1952 incidents: On July 21, a ground observer at Oak Ridge reported a UFO which was allegedly detected on radar. A similar event occurred at Hanford on December 10.

In 1952, the Life Magazine article Have We Visitors From Space? reported that in the fall of 1949, an unnamed Air Force officer charged with "command of the radar equipment that keeps watch over a certain atomic installation" reported an unusual radar return suggesting "five apparently metallic objects" which traversed the 300-mile range of the radar scope in less than four minutes. Publicity surrounding the piece is believed to have contributed to the 1952 UFO flap, a subsequent wave of reports that summer.

=== Contactees and nuclear war ===
The 1951 film The Day the Earth Stood Still featured a benevolent spaceman who comes to Earth with a warning about atomic weapons. The follow year, new age figure George Adamski began claiming contact with benevolent "space brothers" who were similarly concerned about atomic weapons.

=== White Sands region ===
White Sands, site of the Trinity test, was cited as a UFO hotspot; Air Force UFO investigator Edward Ruppelt later recalled "As more UFO's were observed near the Air Force's Muroc Test Center, the Army's White Sands Proving Ground, and atomic bomb plants, ATIC's efforts became more concentrated." The White Sands Proving Ground, the largest military installation in the United States, encompasses almost 3,200 sq mi (8,300 km^{2}) including parts of Doña Ana, Otero, Socorro, Sierra, and Lincoln counties. Nearby locations include Holloman Air Force Base, Las Cruces, Alamagordo, and El Paso, Texas. In 1949, astronomer and discoverer of Pluto Clyde Tombaugh reported seeing UFOs over Las Cruces.

In March 1950, True magazine published a report by Commander Robert B. McLaughlin, the officer "who was at that time in charge of a team of Navy scientists at the super hush-hush guided missile test and development area, White Sands Proving Ground, New Mexico". McLaughlin detailed sightings made at White Sands, including ones made on April 5, 1948 and April 24, 1949.

In 1957, amid media coverage of the Sputnik, a spate of sightings were reported. Hours after UFO reports in Levelland, military police patrols at the White Sands Proving Ground reported a bright, unidentified egg-shaped object they estimated to be 100 yards in diameter. The object was reportedly was "nearly as bright as the sun" and was reported hovering "over the bunker used in the first A-bomb explosion at Trinity Site". Investigation concluded it was a hoax inspired by the earlier sightings in Texas. Time Magazine covered the cases in its November 17 edition.

On April 24, 1964, Socorro police officer Lonnie Zamora reported two people beside a shiny object that later rose into the air accompanied by a roaring blue and orange flame. Zamora's claims were subject to attention from news media and UFO investigators and organizations, and the U.S. Air Force's Project Blue Book listed the case as "unknown". Conventional explanations of Zamora's claims include a lunar lander test by White Sands Missile Range or a hoax by New Mexico Tech students.

In the 1970s, unsubstantiated legends of a UFO landing at Hollomon Air Force Base were dramatized in film. The Holloman landing legend has been noted for it similarities to the finale of the later Spielberg film Close Encounters of the Third Kind.

=== Big Sur missile test ===
In 1964, a reported UFO incident that took place during a 1964 Air Force deployment to a mountaintop near Big Sur, California. Beginning in 1982, Robert Jacobs, who had overseen the mountaintop team, told of the Big Sur UFO which supposedly interfered with a missile test. Writing in 1993, Kingston George, the project engineer, argued the team had actually recorded the release of decoy warheads and chaff designed to prevent the weapon being intercepted by Soviet defenses.

=== Malmstrom missile malfunction ===
In March 1967, UFO reports over a missile complex occurred during a routine malfunction. In the 1990s, retired Air Force personnel claimed the weapons failure was actually caused by a UFO.

=== Hynek suggests atomic link ===
Astronomer J. Allen Hynek was hired by the Air Force to investigate and debunk UFO reports. On March 24, 1967, Hynek's explanation of a UFO sighting due to "swamp gas" was met with derision. In response, US congressman Gerald Ford called for a formal Congressional investigation into the sightings.

By March 1968, Hynek was publicly speculating that UFOs might "be the result of a completely unknown phenomenon which we don't know about nuclear energy".

=== Rendelsham ===
The Rendlesham Forest incident was a series of reported sightings of unexplained lights near Rendlesham Forest in Suffolk, England, in December 1980, which became linked with UFO landings. The events occurred just outside RAF Woodbridge, which was used at the time by the United States Air Force (USAF). USAF personnel, including deputy base commander Lieutenant Colonel Charles I. Halt, claimed to see things they attributed to the UFO phenomenon, and the incident became one of the most well-known UFO events reported worldwide. It has been compared to the Roswell UFO incident in the United States and is sometimes called "Britain's Roswell".

=== 21st century ===
In 2003, a legend spread that the 1945 Trinity atomic bomb test had brought down an alien spacecraft. In 2008, Robert Hastings authored UFOs & Nukes: Extraordinary Encounters at Nuclear Weapons Sites. Hastings adapted his book into a documentary film in 2016.

According to former AATIP director Luis Elizondo and former U.S. Air Force personnel, "UAPs have interfered and actually brought offline [some of the U.S.'] nuclear capabilities".

According to Elizondo, George Knapp and others, UFO reports interfered with other major powers' nuclear weapons systems – including putting Soviet ones online or taking control of their launch system. In May 2022, it was reported that the U.S. passed the National Defense Authorization Act, proposed by U.S. Senator Kirsten Gillibrand, which requested more regular information on UAP incidents "associated with military nuclear assets, including strategic nuclear weapons and nuclear-powered ships and submarines." Two of the former Air Force personnel who claimed to have witnessed intervention in nuclear weapons systems by UFOs – Robert L. Salas and, in 2020, Robert Hastings – claimed they have additionally been abducted by aliens. In June 2022, it was reported that Deputy Minister of Natural Resources John Hannaford declared that the Canadian Nuclear Safety Commission "is committed to raising the issue" of UAP "with its United States counterpart and sharing any related information going forward" due to "the shared priority for nuclear safety and security of nuclear facilities".

== Statistical studies ==
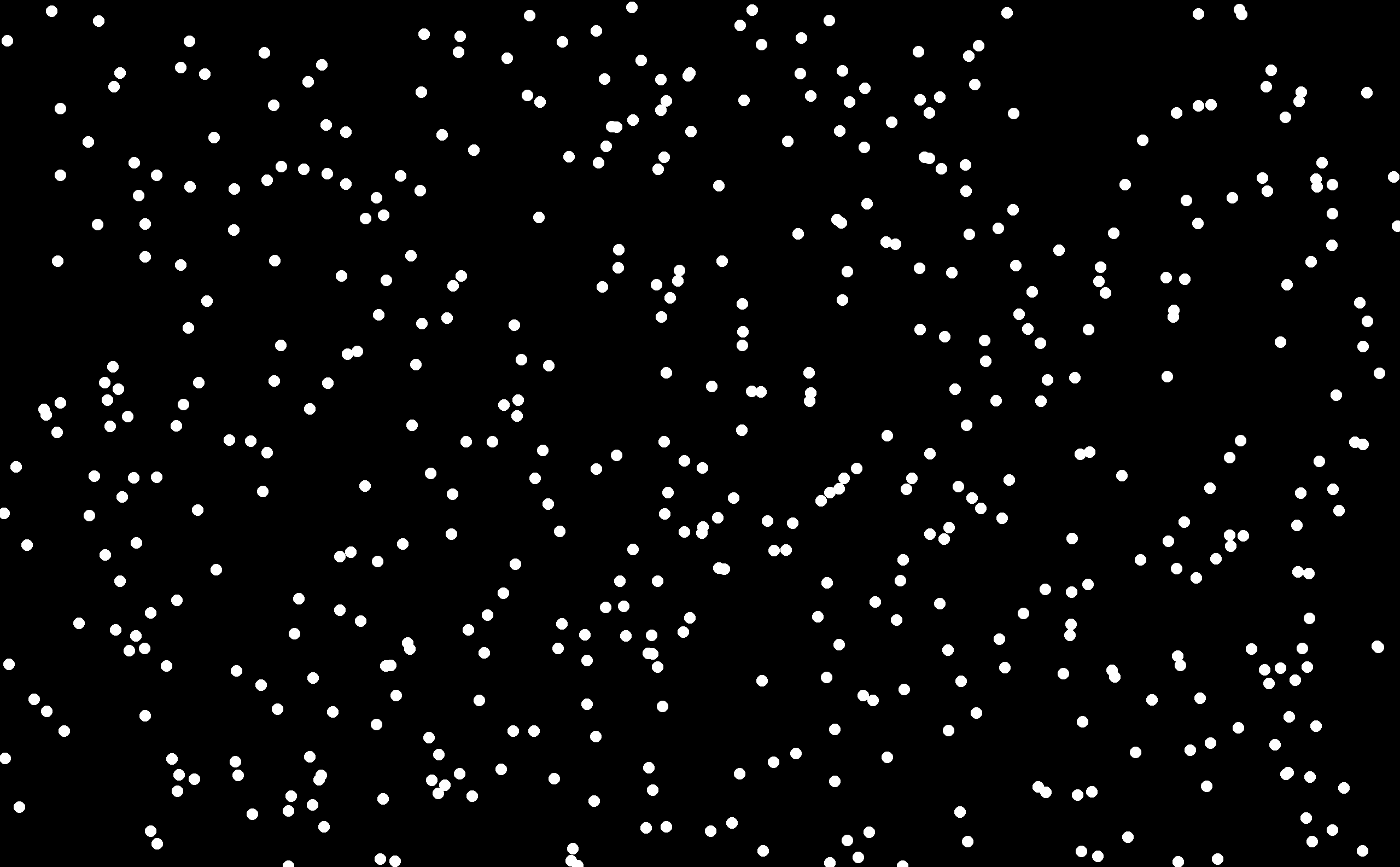
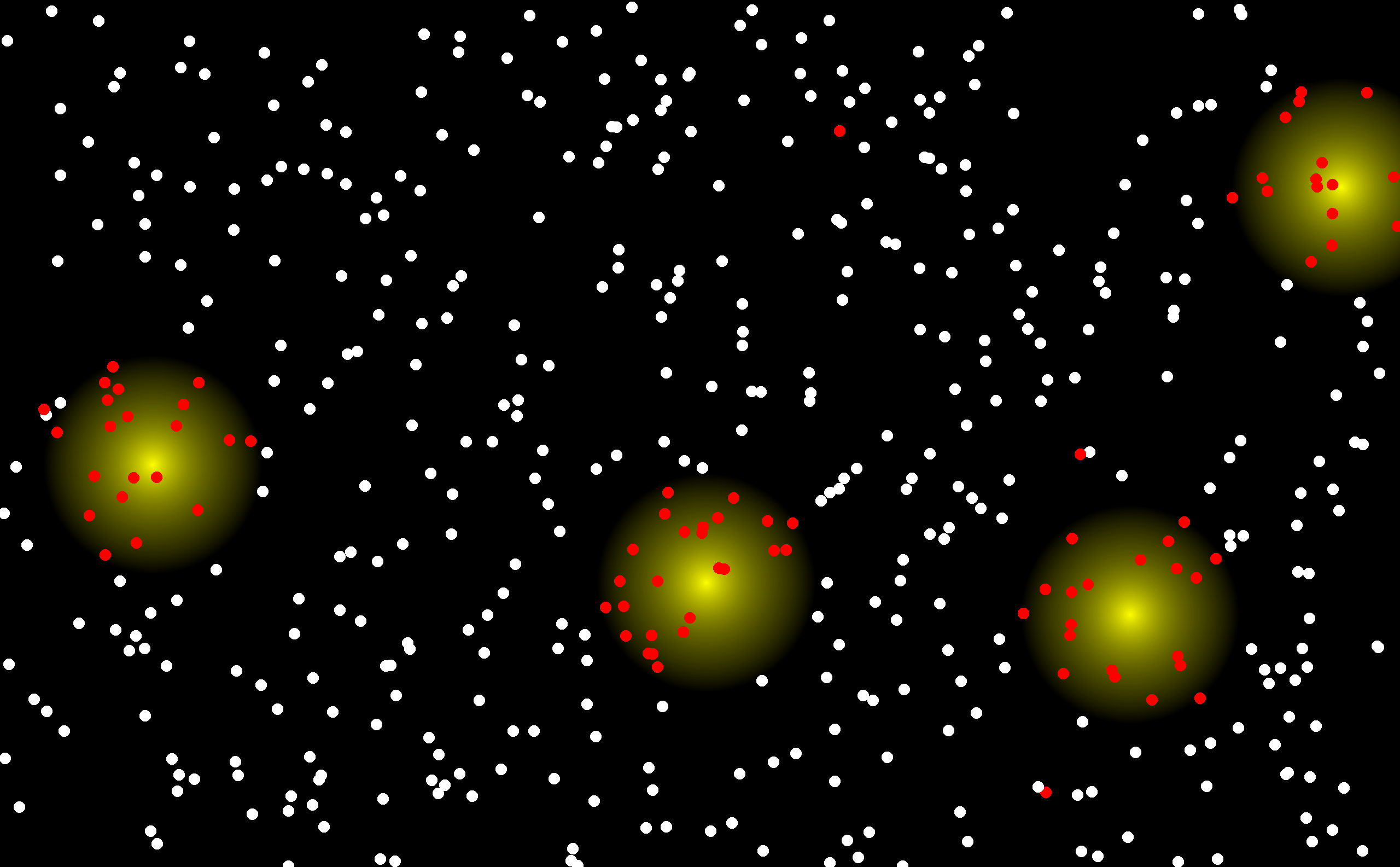
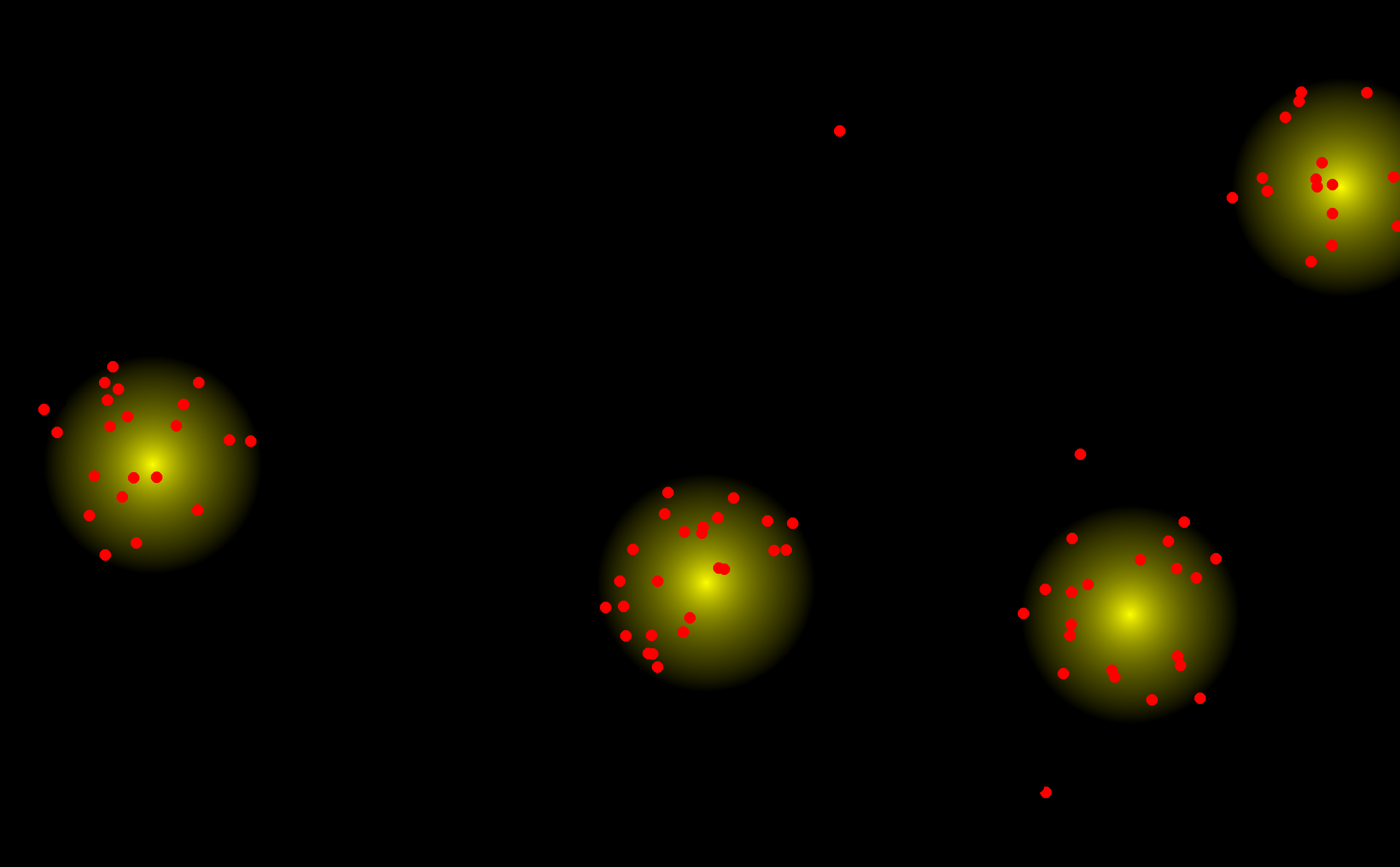
In a visual demonstration of surveillance bias, points are placed completely at random (white dots, top). Points are most likely to be detected (red dots, middle) if they are near a region of heightened scrutiny (yellow). The detected results (red dots, bottom) appear clustered around hotspots. According to a 2021 intelligence analysis, a disproportionate number of UFO reports around military sites might be due to "collection bias as a result of focused attention".

Increased reports of UFOs around atomic sites may be a form of observational bias. Mainstream experts argue the correlation between UFO reports and atomic sites is best explained by the increased scrutiny of airspace around strategically important facilities. While reports of UFOs over US farmland might easily be ignored and forgotten, all the reports of UFOs over US atomic sites would automatically be investigated and documented. An explanatory joke tells of a drunkard who has lost his keys and is looking for them under a streetlight. He admits he does not know precisely where his keys are, but he explains his decision to search under the streetlight, reasoning "that's where the light is". The streetlight effect refers to the tendency of observations to be reported where observations are most likely to occur.

During the 1950s, Air Force officers conducted a rudimentary spatial analysis of UFO reports. Ruppelt observed: "UFOs were seen more frequently around areas vital to the defense of the United States. The Los Alamos-Albuquerque area, Oak Ridge, and White Sands Proving Ground rated high." Ruppelt also detailed UFO reports at Hanford. Ruppelt wrote that UFOs "were habitually reported from areas around technically interesting places like our atomic energy installations, harbors, and critical manufacturing areas. Our studies showed that such vital military areas as Strategic Air Command and Air Defense Command bases, some A-bomb storage areas, and large military depots actually produced fewer reports than could be expected from a given area in the United States. Large population centers devoid of any major 'technically interesting' facilities also produced few reports."

In a 2015 study, economists who conducted a study of UFO reports in France concluded that "the link between nuclear activities and [unexplained UFO reports], which has long been suspected and considered, is now for the first time measured and appears surprisingly high (p-value: 0.00013)". A 2021 document from the Office of the Director of National Intelligence observed: "[UFO reports] also tended to cluster around U.S. training and testing grounds, but we assess that this may result from a collection bias as a result of focused attention, greater numbers of latest-generation sensors operating in those areas, unit expectations, and guidance to report anomalies." Pentagon UFO investigator Sean M. Kirkpatrick concurred "There is a heavy, what we call, collection bias, both in altitude and in geographic location. That's where all of our sensors exist. That's where our training ranges are. That's where operational ranges are. That's where all of our platforms are."

In a study published in 2023 by Sean M. Kirkpatrick and University of Utah geographers, a dataset of UFO reports submitted to the National UFO Reporting Center was analyzed to determine what geographic factors might be connected to UFO report frequency. Comparing report frequency to factors like light pollution, canopy cover, and proximity to airports and military installations, they found UFO reports are more frequent in areas with darker nighttime skies and "wide-open spaces". Additionally, analysis suggested that proximity to airports and military installations was linked to increased UFO reports – a finding the authors interpreted as suggesting man-made aircraft are a cause of UFO reports.

A 2025 study examined unidentified 'transient' light sources on astronomical photographic plates from 1949-1957 -- before the launch of the first artificial satellites. It found such transients were statistically more likely to be observed on days when atomic tests were conducted. The study was rejected for archiving by arXiv as lacking "sufficient or substantive scholarly research" and Michael Wiescher suggested such light sources were non-existent and the study's authors were more likely observing nuclear test debris.
