= Mirage Men =

- Theatrical release poster
- Directed by: John Lundberg; Roland Denning; Kypros Kyprianou
- Written by: Mark Pilkington
- Produced by: Roland Denning; Kypros Kyprianou; John Lundberg; Mark Pilkington
- Starring: Rick Doty
- Cinematography: Grant Wakefield; Zillah Bowes
- Edited by: Roland Denning; Kypros Kyprianou
- Music by: Cyclobe; Urthona
- Production company: Perception Management Productions
- Distributed by: Random Media
- Release dates: 13 June 2013 (Sheffield Doc/Fest); 27 March 2014 (United States)
- Running time: 85 minutes
- Country: United Kingdom
- Language: English

Mirage Men is a 2013 documentary film directed by John Lundberg, written by Mark Pilkington, and co-directed by Roland Denning and Kypros Kyprianou. Mirage Men suggests there was a conspiracy by the U.S. military to fabricate UFO folklore in order to deflect attention from classified military projects. It prominently features Richard C. Doty, a retired special agent who worked for AFOSI, the United States Air Force Office of Special Investigations.

The film had its world premiere at the 2013 Sheffield Doc/Fest in the UK on 13 June 2013, its North American premiere at the 2013 Fantastic Fest in Austin, Texas on 22 September 2013, its Australian premiere at the Canberra International Film Festival on 31 October 2013, and its Nordic premiere at the Stockholm Film Festival in Sweden on 10 November 2013.

Mark Pilkington's book about the project, also called Mirage Men, was published in 2010 by Constable & Robinson.

== Interviews ==
The film features footage of:

- Richard Doty, AFOSI agent
- Linda Moulton Howe, journalist
- Robert Emenegger, creator of 1974 film UFOs: Past, Present, and Future
- Peter Gersten, attorney in the Cash-Landrum incident and UFO advocate
- Tracy Tormé, screenwriter
- Curtis Peebles, author and historian
- Richard Dolan, author and historian
- Mark Pilkington, author of Mirage Men

== Reception ==
Critical reception for the documentary has been positive. Twitch Film said the film was "scary [and] unsettling" and "offered profound food for thought". Electric Sheep magazine called it "one of the must see documentaries of the year". Ain't it Cool News called the film "a real head trip" and said they were "glued to [their] seat".

== Influence and aftermath ==
Mirage Men has been excerpted in the Adam Curtis documentary HyperNormalisation on BBC iPlayer.

American novelist Ernest Cline credits the Mirage Men film as an influence on his novel and screenplay Armada, in which the government has known for decades of an alien invasion and has been funding sci-fi films and video games in order to prepare people for war.

== Rick Doty ==
The central figure of the film is Richard Charles Doty, born in 1950. Doty grew up in Pennsylvania, and then joined the Air Force. He had assignments in Texas, Vietnam, Washington state, West Germany, and South Dakota. In 1979, he was serving with AFOSI at Kirtland Air Force Base in New Mexico. After retiring, Doty worked as a traffic cop in New Mexico.

In 1989, Doty was named in Linda Moulton Howe's book An Alien Harvest.

== See also ==
- UFO Cover Up? Live, a 1988 television broadcast featuring Richard Doty claiming aliens like strawberry icecream
- Fred Crisman, promoter of the Maury Island incident hoax
- Carl Meredith Allen, promoter of the Philadelphia Experiment hoax
- John Lear, promoter of Dulce Base and Alien-Human Treaty hoaxes
- UFO reports and disinformation
