= Viva Verdi! =

2024 American documentary film

- Directed by: Yvonne Russo
- Written by: Yvonne Russo; Christine La Monte
- Produced by: Christine La Monte; Yvonne Russo; Ron Simons
- Cinematography: Jacek Laskus
- Edited by: Federico Conforti
- Music by: Nicholas Pike
- Production companies: La Monte Productions; SimonSays Entertainment; Wanbli; Foothill Productions; Harnisch Foundation; Artemis Rising Foundation
- Release date: October 19, 2024 (Woodstock)
- Running time: 77 minutes
- Countries: United States; Italy
- Language: English

Viva Verdi! is a 2024 documentary film directed by Yvonne Russo, and produced by Christine La Monte, p.g.a, Yvonne Russo, p.g.a. and Ron Simons. The film is an intimate glimpse into the lives of the celebrated opera singers and musicians currently living out their 'third act' while mentoring international music students who live among them at Milan's unique retirement home Casa Verdi, built by renowned opera composer Giuseppe Verdi in 1896.

It had its world premiere at the Woodstock Film Festival on October 19, 2024. At the 98th Academy Awards it received a nomination for Best Original Song "Sweet Dreams of Joy" written by composer Nicholas Pike and performed by Puerto Rican soprano Ana María Martínez.

== Premise ==
Explores the lives of celebrated opera singers and musicians living at Casa di Riposo per Musicisti, as they mentor music students who live among them.

== Production ==
Yvonne Russo decided to make a documentary revolving around Casa Verdi, after photographer David Yoder took her there. Russo and her producing partner Christine La Monte, went to Milan with their own funds to secure permission from Casa Verdi to film there. Production took several years due to raising money and other work commitments. The film is the last one produced by Ron Simons before his death.

== Release ==
It had its world premiere at the Woodstock Film Festival on October 19, 2024. It also screened at the 40th Santa Barbara International Film Festival on February 5, 2025. It had an Oscar-qualifying release on October 3, 2025.

== Reception ==
Alex Saveliev of Film Threat gave the film an eight out of ten, writing: "Featuring fascinating archival footage, timeless music, and a plethora of compelling subjects, the film may have a rather narrow target audience, but boy, will it please them." Carmen Paddock of Movies We Texted About wrote: "Viva Verdi! treats its subjects, its historic patron, and the art of music – from its classical and operatic forms to improvisational electric guitar crossovers – with an openhearted respect."
