= UFO reports and disinformation =

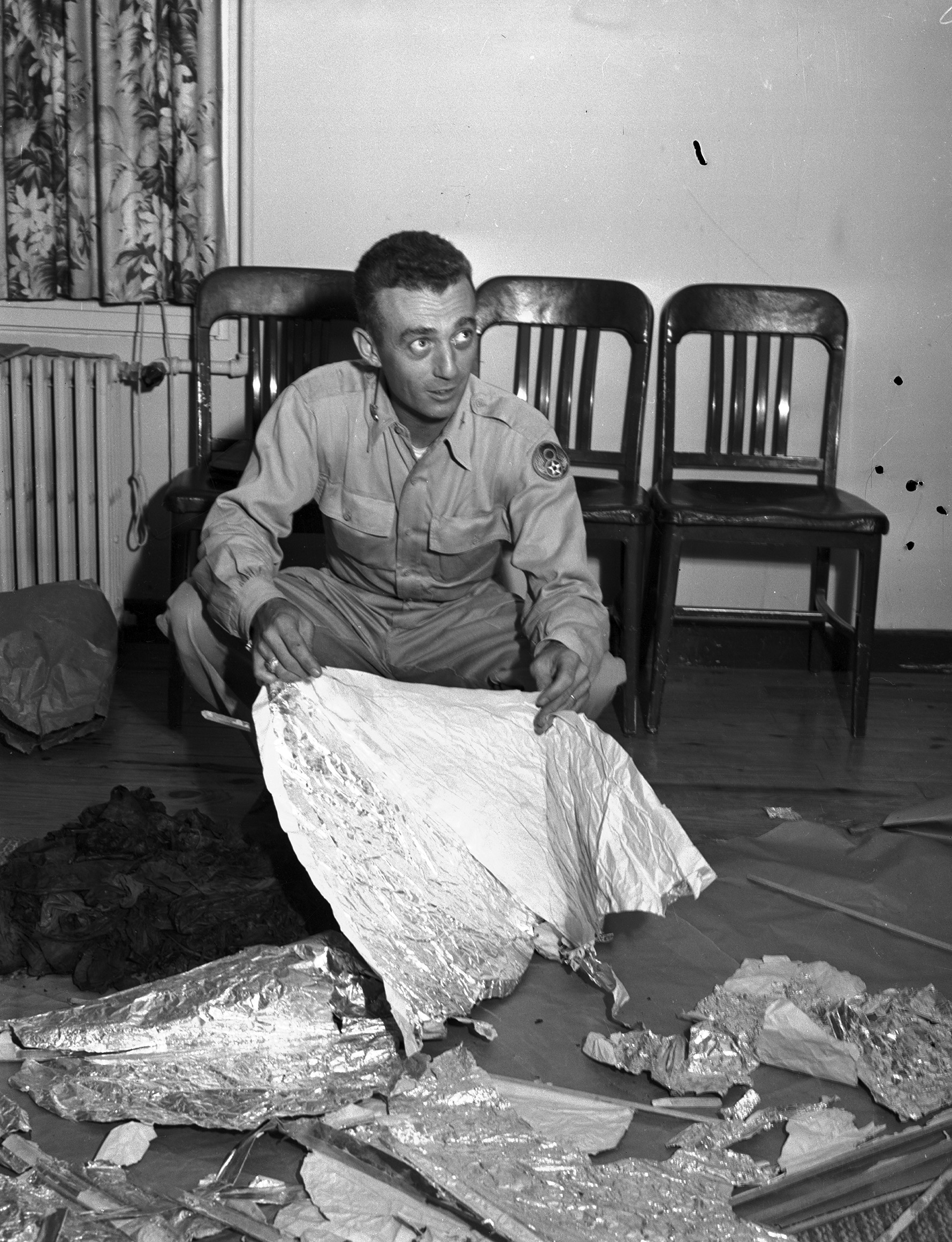
Major Jesse A. Marcel of Roswell posing with balloon debris. Officers deflected attention from the crash of a top secret Project Mogul balloon by reporting that it was a conventional weather balloon.

Censorship, counter-intelligence, cover-ups and disinformation have long been used to protect national security secrets. In the era of flight, governments began using these techniques to protect secret aerial objects, sometimes even suggesting UFO reports were caused by alien spacecraft rather than top-secret aircraft.

As early as 1942, US officials took steps to cover up their advances in jet plane technology, and by 1945 a widespread censorship campaign covered-up the fact that Japan's intercontinental balloons were reaching the US west coast, briefly halting plutonium production and killing a handful of civilians. In 1947, the Army publicly claimed that unusual debris recovered by Roswell personnel had come from a weather balloon, but in 1994 Air Force historians concluded that the weather balloon explanation had likely been a cover for Project Mogul.

By 2013, the film Mirage Men revealed an organized campaign to spread disinformation about UFOs had been in operation by the late 1970s. In 2025, it was revealed that since the 1950s, the United States Air Force had a systemic practice of spreading false UFO stories about extraterrestrials and a reverse-engineering program.

== Claims of insiders spreading UFO tales ==
Since the 1950s, people have publicly claimed that government or military insiders were spreading stories about spaceships piloted by extraterrestrials. Donald Keyhoe made the claim in books like The Flying Saucers Are Real and The Flying Saucer Conspiracy.

In subsequent decades, Jacques Vallée and J. Allen Hynek promoted claims of insiders spreading UFO lore. The 1980s saw such claims being made by journalist Linda Moulton Howe, Canadian former transportation minister Paul Hellyer, Army officer Philip Corso, and conspiracy figures Paul Bennewitz, William Cooper, John Lear and Bob Lazar. By the 1990s and 21st century, claimants included astronaut Edgar Mitchell, disclosure movement leader Steven Greer, journalist Leslie Kean, electrical engineer and parapsychologist Harold E. Puthoff, astrophysicist Eric Davis, immunologist Garry Nolan, musician Tom DeLonge, JFK advisor Harald Malmgren, and Pentagon figures Luis Elizondo and David Grusch.

Legends held that Jackie Gleason had been told aliens were real by Richard Nixon. Director Steven Spielberg claimed Ronald Reagan had suggested aliens were real during a White House screening of E.T. in the 1980s.

== Chronology ==
=== P-59 Airacomet ===
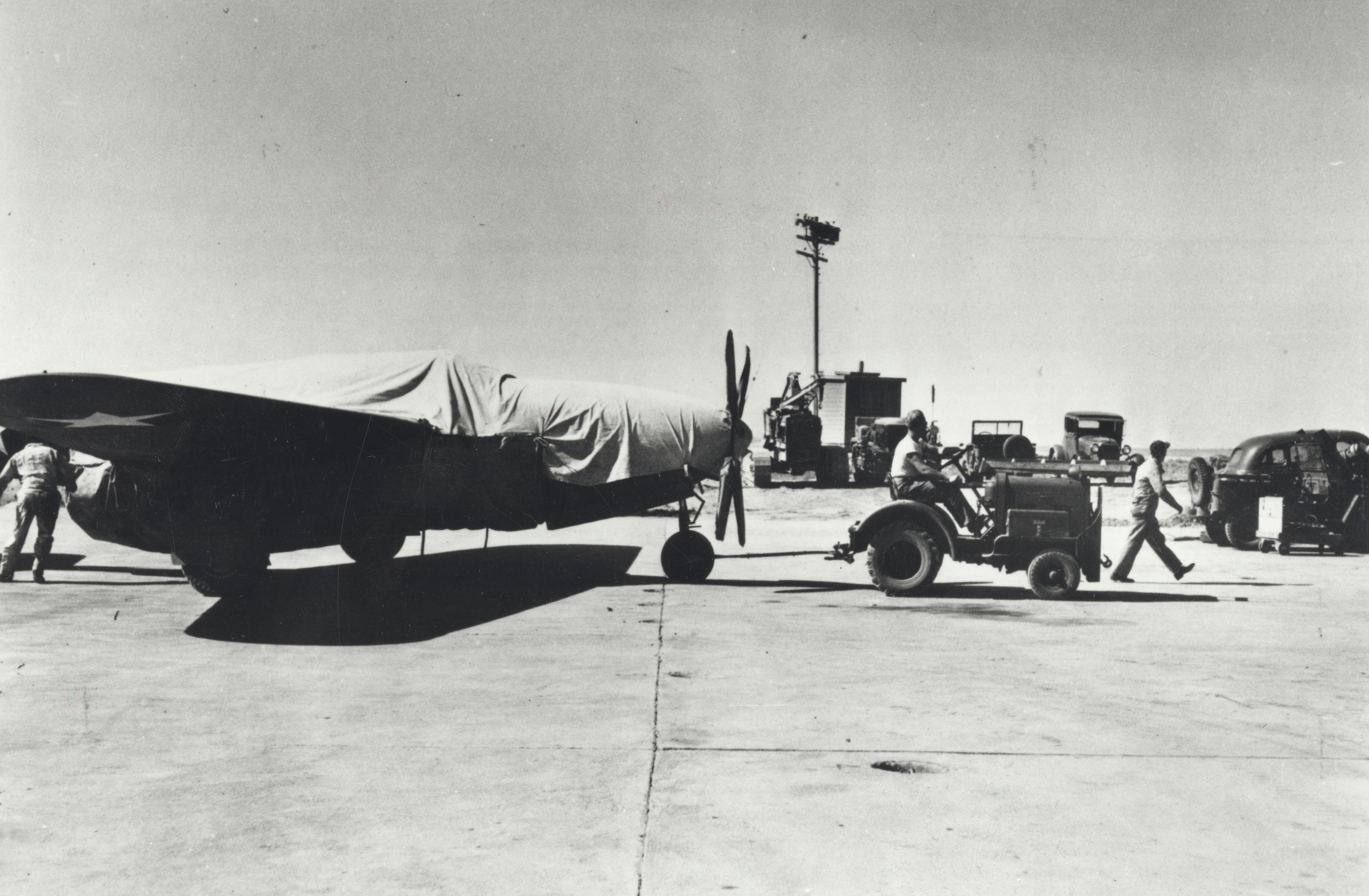
Bell XP-59A Airacomet with fake propeller to cover its jet propulsion

To protect the secrets of the US's first jet fighter, the Bell P-59 Airacomet, the Army Air Corps began a deception campaign against some of its own pilots. The designation was chosen as disinformation, to suggest it was a development of the unrelated Bell XP-59 fighter project which had been canceled. On the ground, the plane was fitted with a false propeller to disguise its novel propulsion system. However, occasionally nearby pilots training on P-38s would spot the experimental craft. In response, chief test pilot Jack Woolam began wearing a gorilla mask, derby hat and holding a cigar. Some trainees witnessed a mysterious unidentified plane with no propeller apparently piloted by an absurdly-dressed gorilla.

=== Fu-Go balloons ===
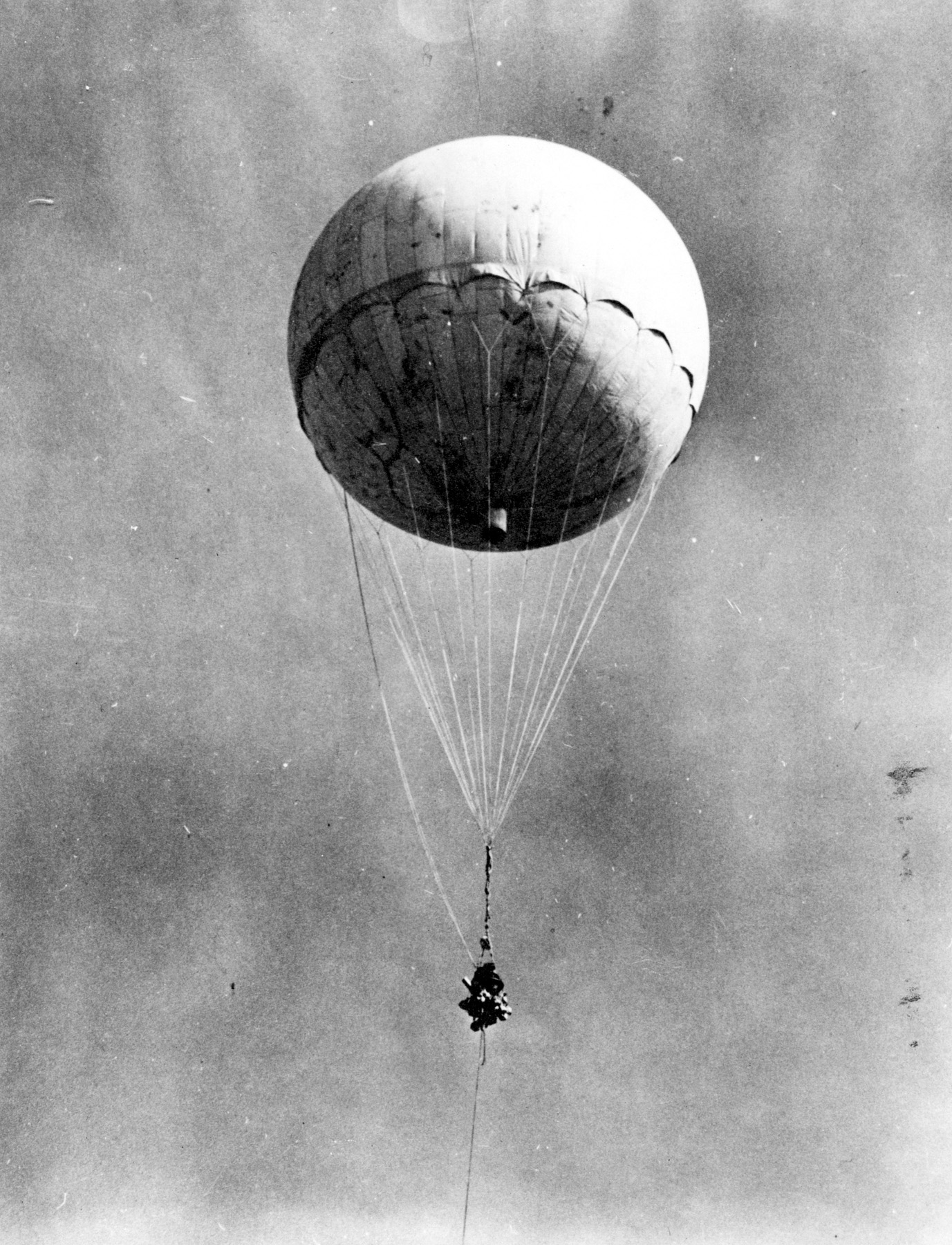
A Fu-Go balloon bomb, the first weapon delivery system with intercontinental range

During the 1940s, Japan developed intercontinental balloon bombs. The Fu-Go balloon bomb was the first weapon system with intercontinental range, predating the intercontinental ballistic missile. Between November 1944 and April 1945, the Imperial Japanese Army launched about 9,300 balloons from sites on coastal Honshu, of which about 300 were found or observed in the U.S., Canada, and Mexico.

One breach occurred in late February, when Representative Arthur L. Miller mentioned the balloons in a weekly column he sent to all 91 newspapers in his Nebraska district, which stated in part: "As a final act of desperation, it is believed that the Japs may release fire balloons aimed at our great forests in the northwest". In response, intelligence officers at the Seventh Service Command in Omaha contacted the editors at all 91 papers, requesting censorship; this was largely successful, with only two papers printing the column. In late March, the United Press (UP) wrote a detailed article on the balloons intended for its national distributors; the Army officer who reported the breach commented that it included "a lot of mechanical detail on the thing, in addition to being a hell of a scare story". Censors contacted the UP, which replied that the article had not yet been teletyped; all five copies were retrieved and destroyed. Investigators determined the information originated from a briefing to Colorado state legislators, which had been leaked in an open session.

The most damaging attack occurred on March 10, 1945, when a balloon descended near Toppenish, Washington, and collided with electric transmission lines, causing a short circuit which cut off power to the Manhattan Project's production facility at the state's Hanford Engineer Works. It took three days for its plutonium-producing nuclear reactors to be restored to full capacity; the plutonium was later used in Fat Man, the atomic bomb dropped on Nagasaki. On May 5, 1945, six civilians were killed by one of the bombs near Bly, Oregon, becoming the war's only fatalities in the contiguous U.S.

In late April, censors investigated the nationally-syndicated comic strip Tim Tyler's Luck by Lyman Young, which depicted a Japanese balloon recovered by the crew of an U.S. submarine. In subsequent weeks, its protagonists fought monster vines which sprang from seeds the balloon was carrying, created by an evil Japanese horticulturalist. A few weeks later, the comic strip Smilin' Jack by Zack Mosley depicted a plane crashing into a Japanese balloon, which exploded and started a fire upon falling to the ground. In both cases, the Office of Censorship deemed it unnecessary to censor the Sunday comics.

=== Nazi 'superweapon' propaganda ===
During World War Two, the German government spread propaganda of a coming "wonder weapon" that would turn the tide of the war. "Wunderwaffe" was a term used by Nazi Germany's propaganda ministry to mean revolutionary "superweapons". Most of these weapons however remained prototypes, which either never reached the combat theater, or if they did, were too late or in too insignificant numbers to have a military effect. The term Wunderwaffe now generally refers to a universal solution which solves all problems related to a particular issue, mostly used ironically for its illusionary nature.

In the aftermath, Allied pilots and later UFO conspiracy theorists suspected the Germans had developed a secret aerial technology that was responsible for some UFO reports.

=== Project Mogul ===
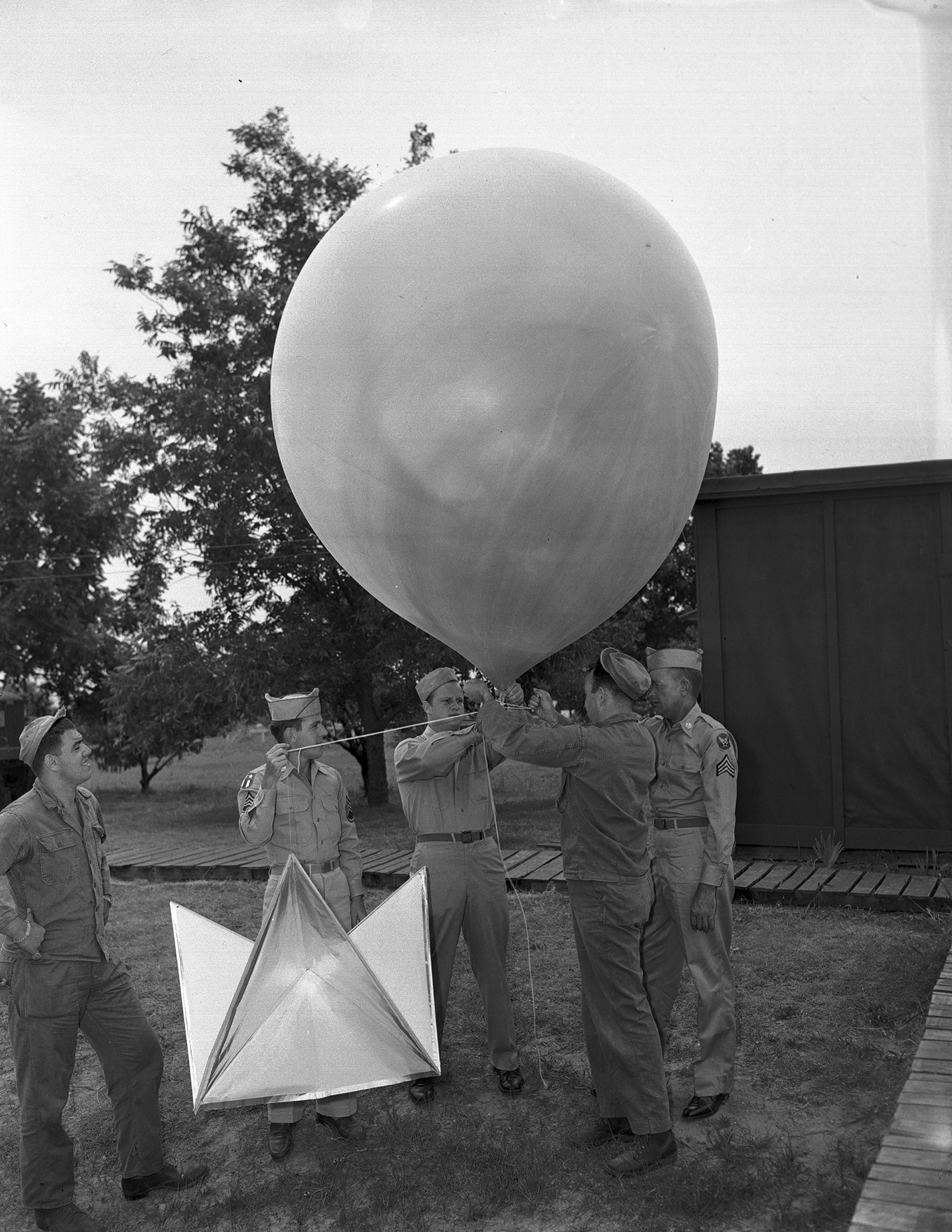
A weather balloon and radar target being launched for press reporting on the Roswell debris.

After debris was found on a Corona ranch in New Mexico, on July 8, 1947, press announced that Army Air Forces at Roswell had recovered a "flying disc". The military initially told the public that the object had been merely a weather balloon and staged weather balloon launches for the press. By the 1970s, Air Force officers began to admit the weather balloon story had been part of a cover-up. In the 1990s, an Air Force report concluded the debris had come from a Project Mogul balloon designed to detect Soviet atomic tests. Mogul Balloons, like the Japanese Fu-Go balloons that inspired them, were top secret.

=== Twin Falls Saucer Hoax ===
A "strange, circular device" was allegedly discovered in Twin Falls, Idaho by a Mrs. Fred Easterbrook. Newspapers reported that military intelligence agents flew in the same day from Salt Lake City to "further investigate the alleged "flying saucer"". Special Agent In Charge of the Federal Bureau of Investigation in Montana and Idaho Guy Banister was quoted as having said that "the Bureau has reported the object to the army". Following an "investigaton [sic] by the FBI, Sixth Army and police officials" it was announced by authorities in Salt Lake City that the object was a "hoax built by four teen-age boys from jukebox parts". Police Chief L. D. McCracken of Twin Falls claimed the boys were not to be named or disciplined because they were "juveniles". A contemporary editorial noted that, "not until the army officials who flew here from Salt Lake City had started on their return trip was there any indication that the whole business was a hoax [...] There is only one conclusion. Either the army doesn't know what these "saucers" are all about and is pretty much in a dither, or it made a grandstand play of the Twin Falls incident to keep the public ignorant or confused—or both."

=== 1950s spy planes ===
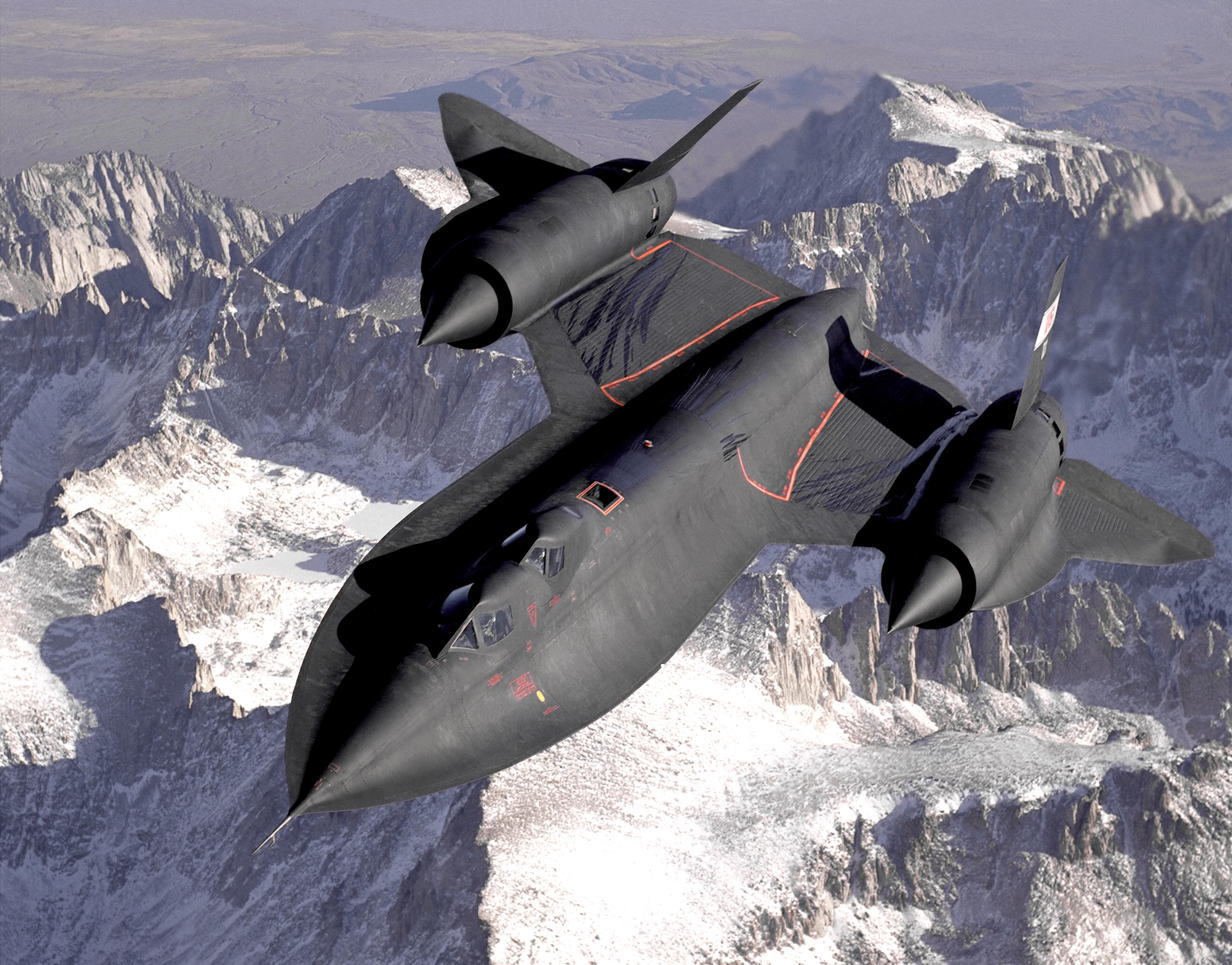
The SR-71

Classified Lockheed U-2 and SR-71 flights were estimated to account for half of UFO reports in the late 1950s and 1960s over the United States. Air Force issued "misleading and deceptive statements" to protect the project, contributing to "conspiracy theories and the coverup controversy of the 1970s".

=== Atlas rocket test with decoy warheads ===
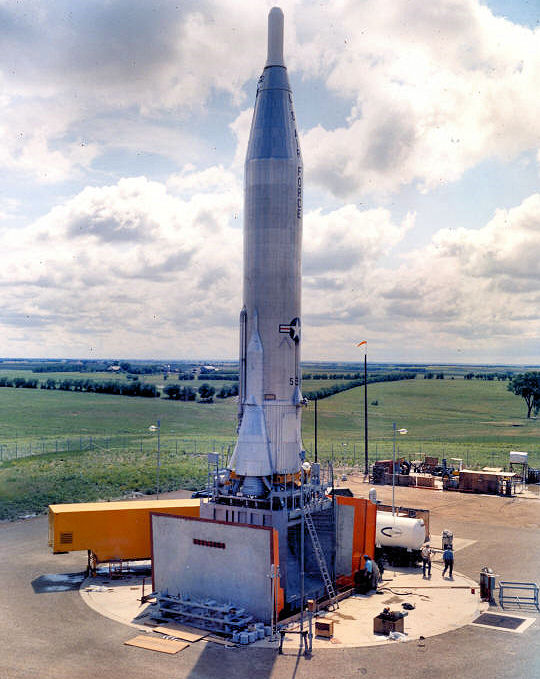
Atlas rocket

The Big Sur UFO is a reported UFO incident that took place during a 1964 Air Force deployment to a mountaintop near Big Sur, California. The deployment was a mission which was to film Atlas missile tests from Vandenberg Air Force Base.

Since 1982, Robert Jacobs, who had overseen the mountaintop team, has claimed the team filmed an "intelligently controlled flying device" that followed a missile and emitted a "beam of energy" to disable the weapon.

Writing in 1993, Kingston George, the project engineer, argued the team had actually recorded the release of decoy warheads and chaff designed to prevent the weapon being intercepted by Soviet defenses. According to George, Jacobs did not have clearance to be told the truth of what they had recorded and mistook decoy deployment as extraterrestrial interference.

=== Kecksberg crash retrieval ===
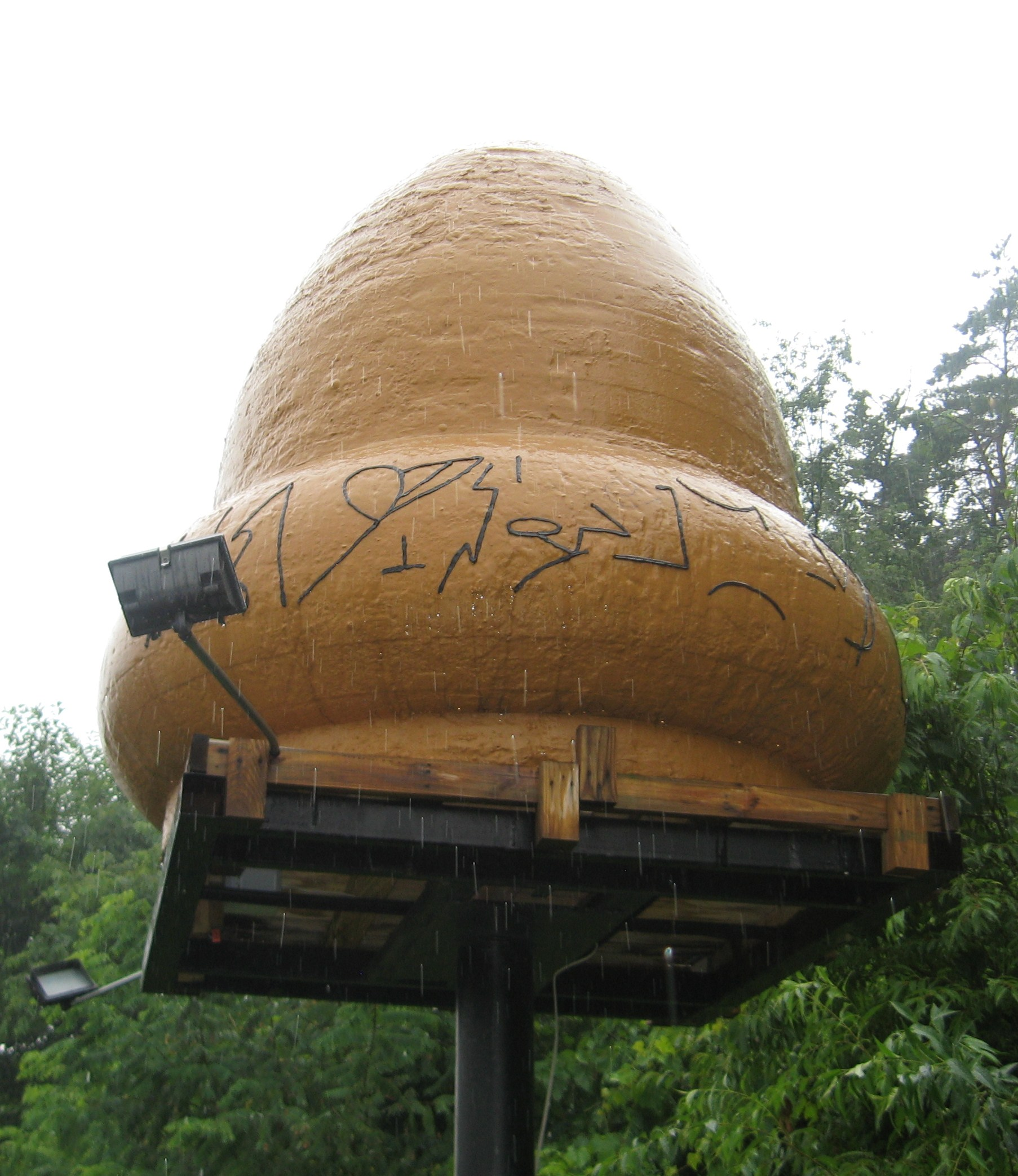
A model of the alleged object

On December 9, 1965, a fireball was observed across six states. After residents of Kecksburg reported a crash in nearby woods, State Police cordoned off the area, awaiting the arrival of the Army. Though officials said they had been unable to find the meteor, local witnesses reported seeing an Army flatbed truck transporting a large "acorn-shaped" object, about the size of a small car. Discrepancy between witness accounts and official statements led UFO conspiracy theorists to suggest the government had recovered a Nazi wonderweapon or an alien spacecraft.

In December 2005, NASA released a report on metallic fragments from the site which concluded the crashed object had been a Soviet satellite. They noted that they were unable to find NASA records of involvement in the recovery, prompting space writer James Oberg to suggest that the supposed NASA team that investigated the site back in 1965 were in fact Air Force personnel who falsely identified themselves as NASA personnel, something regularly done by military personnel in civilian clothes during the 1960s.

=== Missile silo EMP test near Malmstrom ===
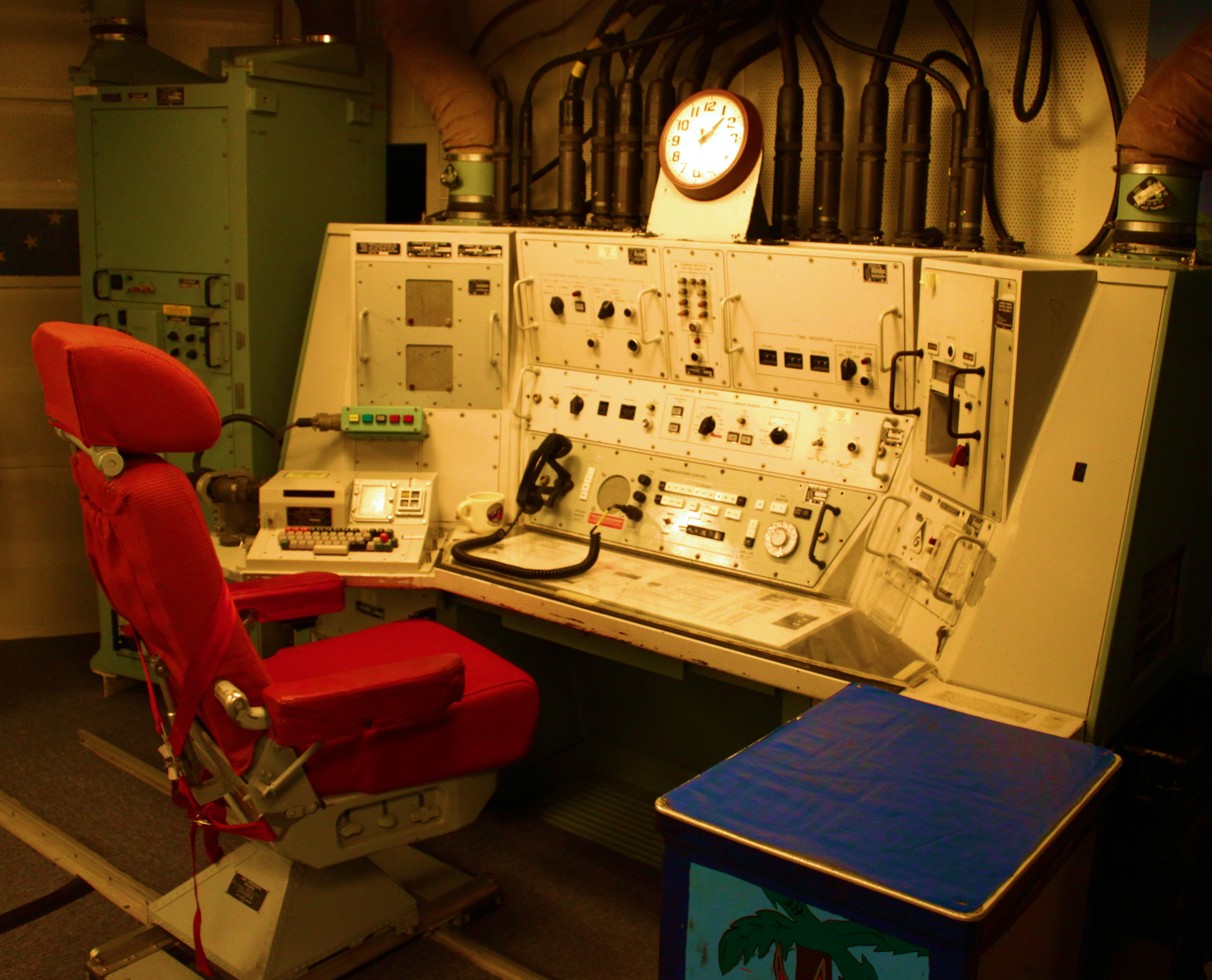
A Minuteman launch control center

During the 1967 Malmstrom UFO incident, a weapons failure at a Montana nuclear missile complex was connected to reports of a UFO sighting. Beginning in the 1990s, Robert Salas, who was on-duty during the event, publicly interpreted the events as an alien intervention against nuclear weapons. In 2025, the Wall Street Journal reported that the incident had been caused by a classified test of an electromagnetic pulse device.

=== Stealth helicopters and cattle mutilations ===
The 2013 documentary Mirage Men suggests there was a conspiracy by the U.S. military to fabricate UFO folklore in order to deflect attention from classified military projects. It prominently features Richard C. Doty, a retired special agent who worked for AFOSI, the United States Air Force Office of Special Investigations.

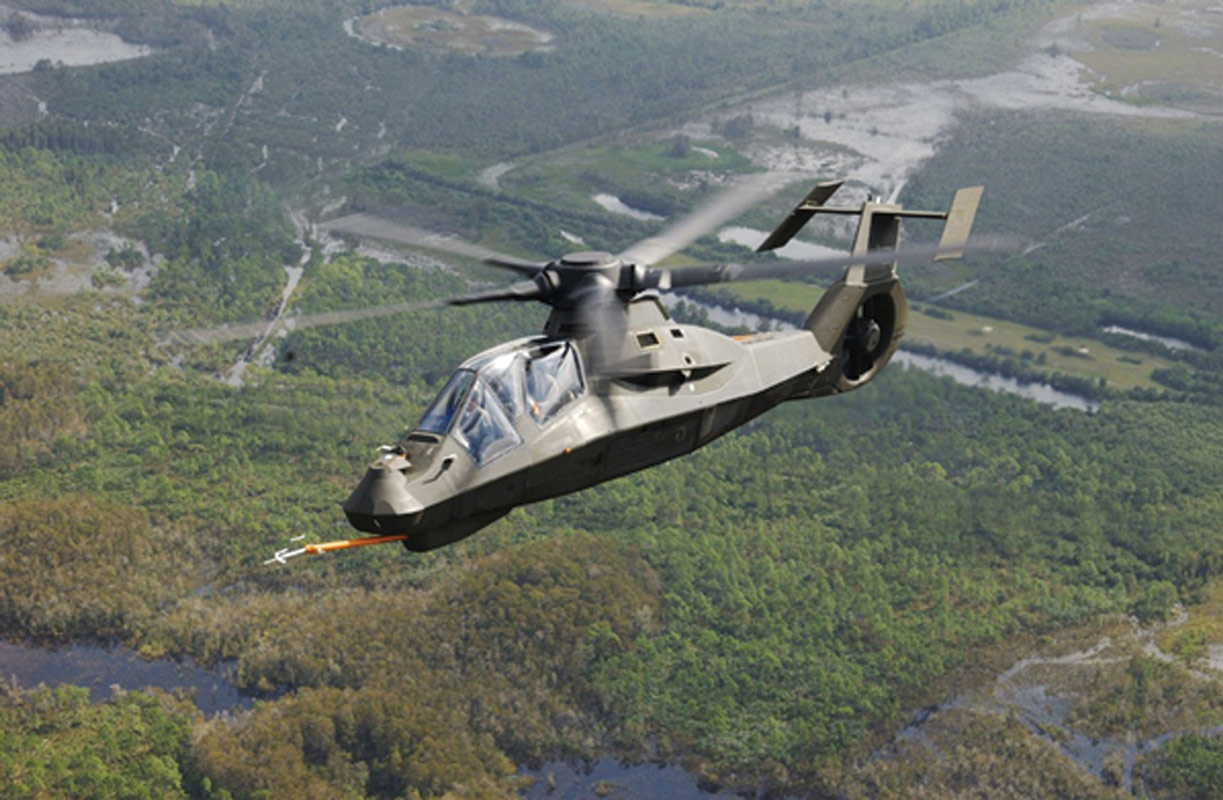
1997 photograph of a black stealth helicopter in daytime. Primitive stealth helicopters were first used by the US in the early 1970s

Stealth helicopters were secretly developed and employed by the Central Intelligence Agency (CIA) during the early 1970s. A modified Hughes 500P was produced for the agency; it had a reduced noise operation capability, leading to its nickname of "The Quiet One". It was reportedly used in at least one operation by the CIA during the Vietnam War.

During the mid-1970s, cattle mutilations become associated with reports of unidentified quiet black helicopters. Knox County Sheriff Herbert Thompson claimed helicopter sightings had become a nightly occurrence, with both the FAA and the National Guard reportedly being unaware of any helicopter activity. State police, tribal police and game wardens attempted to pursue the aircraft, but found the mysterious craft would move whenever an officer radioed that he was close. Inferring that the craft's operator was eavesdropping on the radio, law enforcement switched to speaking only in Apache. The strategy worked, and they were able to surround the craft, which was forced to pass overhead of one of the officers. He reported hearing a quiet sound, like a lawn mower. By 1975, the problem was so prevalent, that some ranchers formed armed vigilante groups to patrol their fields at night. Authorities ran ads in Colorado urging ranchers to not shoot at their survey helicopters. The National Guard warned its helicopter pilots to fly at higher than normal altitude to avoid fire from "jittery farmers".

On April 20, 1979, U.S. Attorney R. E. Thompson and US Senator Harrison Schmidt held a public meeting about cattle mutilations. The meeting was attended by about 80; one attendee was amateur UFO researcher Paul Bennewitz. At the meeting, Bennewitz was introduced to highway patrol officer Gabe Valdez who was investigating the incidents. Sources suggest government agents likely "first identified" Bennewitz at this his 1979 meeting or outright targeted him for his participation.

==== Majestic 12 ====
Majestic 12 was the purported organization described in faked government documents delivered anonymously to multiple ufologists in the 1980s. (Note: The MJ-12 organization is given several similar names. The Shandera document called it "Majestic-12 (Majic-12)". Pratt and Moore used "Majik 12" when working on their novel. The earliest Bennewitz memo called it "MJ Twelve". Milton William Cooper called it "MAJESTY TWELVE".) All individuals who received the fake documents were connected to Bill Moore. After the publication of The Roswell Incident, Richard C. Doty and other individuals presenting themselves as Air Force Intelligence Officers approached Moore. They used the unfulfilled promise of hard evidence of extraterrestrial retrievals to recruit Moore, who kept notes on other ufologists and intentionally spread misinformation within the UFO community. The earliest known reference to "MJ Twelve" comes from a 1981 document used in disinformation targeting Paul Bennewitz. In 1982, Bob Pratt worked with Doty and Moore on The Aquarius Project, an unpublished science fiction manuscript about the purported organization. Moore had initially planned to do a nonfiction book but lacked evidence. During a phone call about the manuscript, Moore explained to Pratt that his goal was to "get as much of the story out with as little fiction as possible." That same year, Moore, Friedman, and Jaime Shandera began work on a KPIX-TV UFO documentary, and Moore shared the original "MJ Twelve" memo mentioning Bennewitz. KPIX-TV contacted the Air Force, who noted many style and formatting errors; Moore admitted that he had typed and stamped the document as a facsimile. On December 11, 1984, Shandera received the first anonymous package containing photographs of Majestic-12 documents just after a phone call from Moore. The anonymously delivered documents detailed the creation of a likely fictitious Majestic 12 group formed to handle Roswell debris.

External videos
- Bill Moore addresses MUFON, July 1 1989

At a 1989 Mutual UFO Network conference, Moore confessed that he had intentionally fed fake evidence of extraterrestrials to UFO researchers, including Bennewitz. Doty later said that he gave fabricated information to UFO researchers while working at Kirtland Air Force Base in the 1980s. Roswell conspiracy proponents turned on Moore, but not the broader conspiracy theory.

The Majestic-12 materials have been heavily scrutinized and discredited. The various purported memos existed only as copies of photographs of documents. Carl Sagan criticized the complete lack of provenance of documents "miraculously dropped on a doorstep like something out of a fairy story, perhaps 'The Elves and the Shoemaker'." Researchers noted the idiosyncratic date format not found in government documents from the time they were purported to originate, but widely used in Moore's personal notes. Some signatures appear to be photocopied from other documents. For example, a signature from President Harry Truman is identical to one from an October 1, 1947 letter to Vannevar Bush.

By August 1988, Bennewitz was accusing his wife of being in control of the extraterrestrials. After attempting to barricade himself in his home using sandbags, his family admitted him to the mental health unit of Presbyterian Anna Kaseman Hospital. He remained under observation there for one month.

On October 14, 1988, the television broadcast UFO Cover Up? Live introduced the stories of Majestic 12 and Area 51 to the American public. On July 1, 1989, Moore claimed that he tried to push Bennewitz into a mental breakdown by feeding him false information about aliens.

==== Modern views ====
Later mainstream theories of cattle mutilation speculate they might have been a covert attempt to detect emerging public health threats in the food supply. One potential threat might be 1967's Project Gasbuggy, in which an underground atomic device was detonated just 21 mi (34 km) southwest of Dulce. Others suggest the events might be part of a chemical or biological weapons test, citing the March 1968 case where 6,000 sheep were killed as part of chemical weapons testing; the Army denied responsibility until 1998.

=== Stealth fighters and Area 51 ===
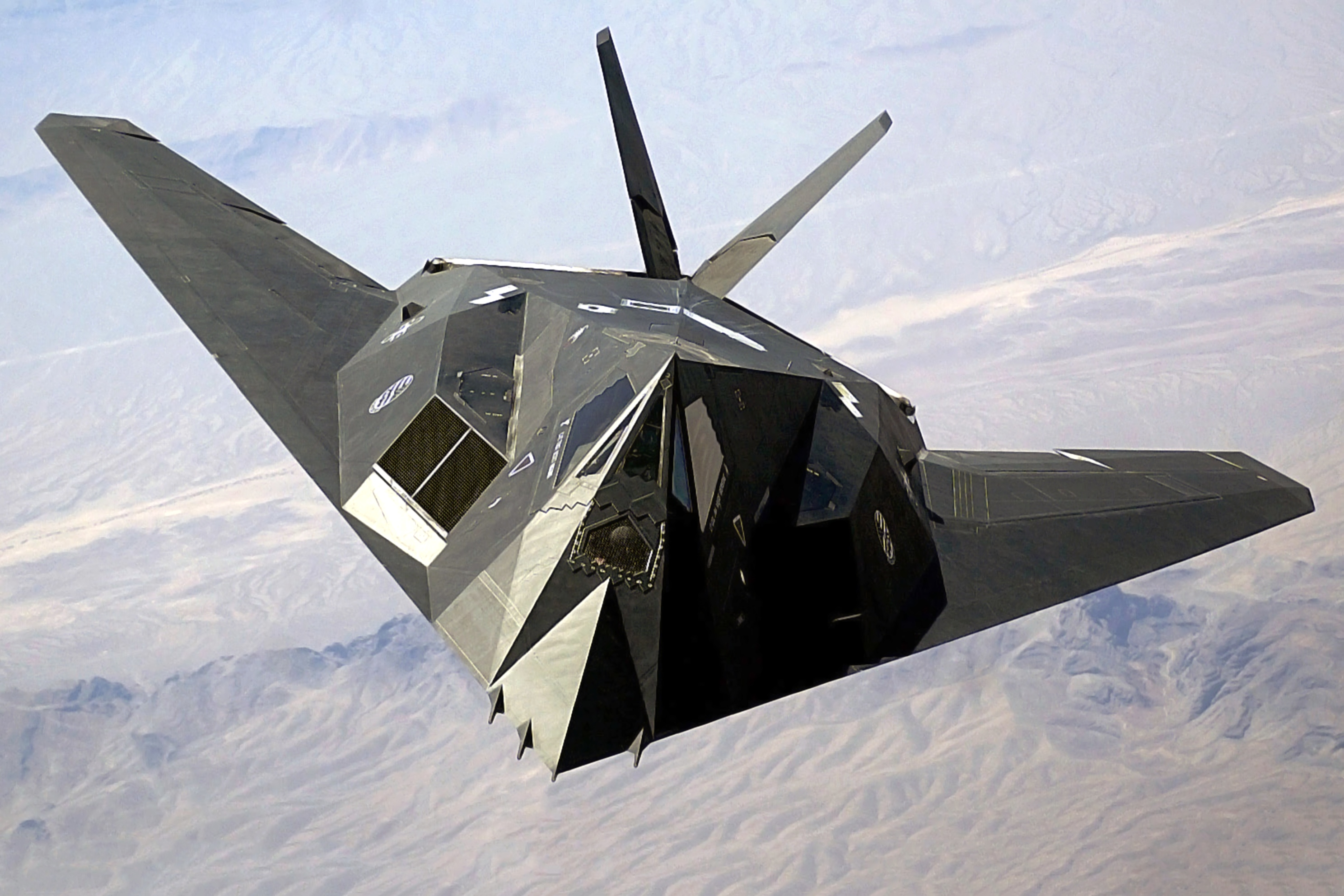
F-117 Nighthawk stealth fighter

On April 20, 1980, media nationwide reported on "Area 51", described as a "secret sector" where US forces trained to rescue the hostages in Iran.

In the 1980s, during the development of the stealth bomber, Air Force officers spread stories and doctored photographs of flying saucers amongst civilians near top secret US test region Area 51. The Wall Street Journal recalled that "military leaders were worried that the programs might get exposed if locals somehow glimpsed a test flight of, say, the F-117 stealth fighter, an aircraft that truly did look out of this world. Better that they believe it came from Andromeda."

=== Russian laser program ===
In the late 2000s, Eric Davis was informed of a Russian program to "reverse-engineer" a crashed UFO's laser system. Pentagon investigator Sean Kirkpatrick told the Wall Street Journal that while the program was real, the UFO claim was likely "misinformation designed to throw America off the trail".

=== "Yankee Blue" ===
In June 2025, the Wall Street Journal published a story on 'Yankee Blue', a supposed hazing ritual that occurred over decades in which hundreds of Air Force personnel were misled into believing extra-terrestrials exist and a reverse-engineering program was underway. The piece reported that a "former Air Force officer was visibly terrified when he told... investigators that he had been briefed on a secret alien project decades earlier, and was warned that if he ever repeated the secret he could be jailed or executed." Similar experiences were reported "by other men who had never spoken of the matter, even with their spouses." According to the report, the practice dated back to as far as the 1950s.

== In popular culture ==
UFOs being used as a cover for secret operations has been depicted in popular fiction. In the 1985 comedy Spies Like Us, two American secret agents fool Soviet soldiers by posing as space aliens. In The X-Files episode "Jose Chung's From Outer Space", Air Force pilots wear gray alien costumes to confuse potential witnesses.

== See also ==
- UFO conspiracy theories, which have alleged government coverups and disinformation
- Men in black, supposed agents of disinformation
- Philadelphia Experiment, UFO-related hoax potentially perpetrated by elements of US Navy
