= Dan Farah =

American film producer and director

Dan Farah is an American film producer and director.

He is a graduate of Columbia High School and Hofstra University.

== Filmography ==
=== Director ===
- The Age of Disclosure (2025)

=== Producer ===
- The Age of Disclosure (2025)
- Call Jane (2022)
- The Phenomenon (2020)
- Famous in Love (2017)
- Ready Player One (2018)
- Burden (2018)
- The Shannara Chronicles (2016)
- Alter Egos (2012)
- The Legend of Awesomest Maximus (2011)
- Armored (2009)
- Visioneers (2008)
- This Is Culdesac (2007)
- Rock the Bells (2006)
- Slam Planet (2006)
