= John Lundberg =

English artist and documentary filmmaker

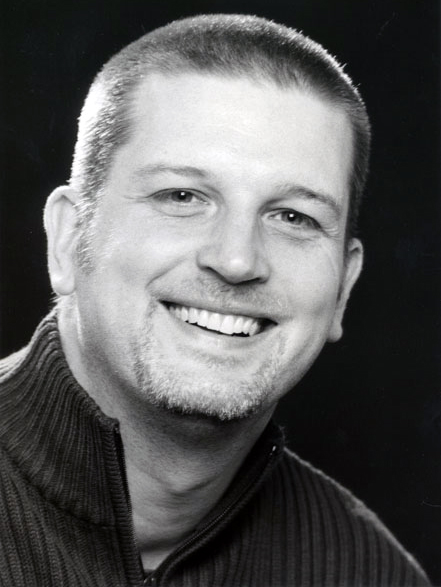
- John Lundberg at the National Film & Television School in 2004.
- Born: 5 December 1968 (age 57); London, England
- Occupations: Artist, director, producer
- Website: www.offkilter.co.uk

John Lundberg (born 5 December 1968) is an English artist and documentary filmmaker. His work is concerned with ostension in folklore. Underpinning all of his work is an interest in how myth and artifice can shape and alter reality, especially regarding crop circles, UFOlogy, and other examples of urban legends and the paranormal.

He was born in London and studied fine art, interactive design, and the creative use of the Internet at Middlesex University (1988–1991), University College London (1991–1992) and the University of Westminster (1996–1997). In the early 1990s he founded Circlemakers, an arts collective dedicated to exploring the phenomenon of crop circles and the role of deception in the process of artistic creation. Lundberg and his collaborators – including Rod Dickinson, Gavin Turk, Simon Bill, Wil Russell and Rob Irving – followed after Doug Bower and Dave Chorley in anonymously creating their own crop circles at night. Sometimes treated as not only authentic but as "significant" by paranormalists, Lundberg and the Circlemakers' work has been the subject of a BBC documentary and been commissioned by various clients, including the rock band Korn.

In 2017 streetwear brand Supreme asked Circlemakers to create a massive crop circle of their Supreme box logo at a secret location in California. The crop circle can be seen in the short film produced by Supreme called Crop Fields.

In 1995 Lundberg created the Circlemakers website to document his group's activities. He also coauthored the 2006 book The Field Guide: The Art, History and Philosophy of Crop Circle Making with Rob Irving.

Lundberg and Dickinson have been accused of being behind the Alien Autopsy footage, a charge they deny (although Lundberg is a fan of the film). Circlemakers' activities have also led to Lundberg and his collaborators being threatened with violence and accused of being MI5 recruits.

Lundberg graduated from the National Film and Television School's Documentary Direction program in 2004, and his graduation film The Mythologist, about UFOlogist Habib Azadehdel, won the Jerwood First Cuts Documentary Award at the Sheffield International Documentary Festival, was shortlisted for the Grierson Awards in the best newcomer category, and was shown on BBC Four.

His feature-length documentary Mirage Men, created with Mark Pilkington, Roland Denning and Kypros Kyprianou is about how the US government used mythology to cover up their advanced technology. The film had its world premiere at the 2013 Sheffield Doc/Fest in the UK on 13 June 2013, its North American premiere at the 2013 Fantastic Fest in Austin, Texas on 22 September 2013, its Australian premiere at the Canberra International Film Festival on 31 October 2013 and its Nordic premiere at the Stockholm Film Festival in Sweden on 10 November 2013. American novelist Ernest Cline credits the Mirage Men movie as an influence on his novel and screenplay Armada. Mark Pilkington's book about the project, also called Mirage Men, was published in 2010 by Constable & Robinson.

Mirage Men has been excerpted in the Adam Curtis documentary HyperNormalisation on BBC iPlayer.

He's currently working on his second feature-length documentary Kaufman Lives about the life, death and legend of Andy Kaufman.

Besides his Circlemakers and film activities, Lundberg has also been involved with gallery-based art in collaboration with UFOlogists, and was reported to have been enlisted by graffiti artist Banksy to stealth-promote the latter's film Exit Through the Gift Shop.
