= Pestival =

- Status: Active
- Genre: Science festival
- Location: London, UK
- Country: United Kingdom
- Founder: Bridget Nicholls
- Website: www.pestival.org

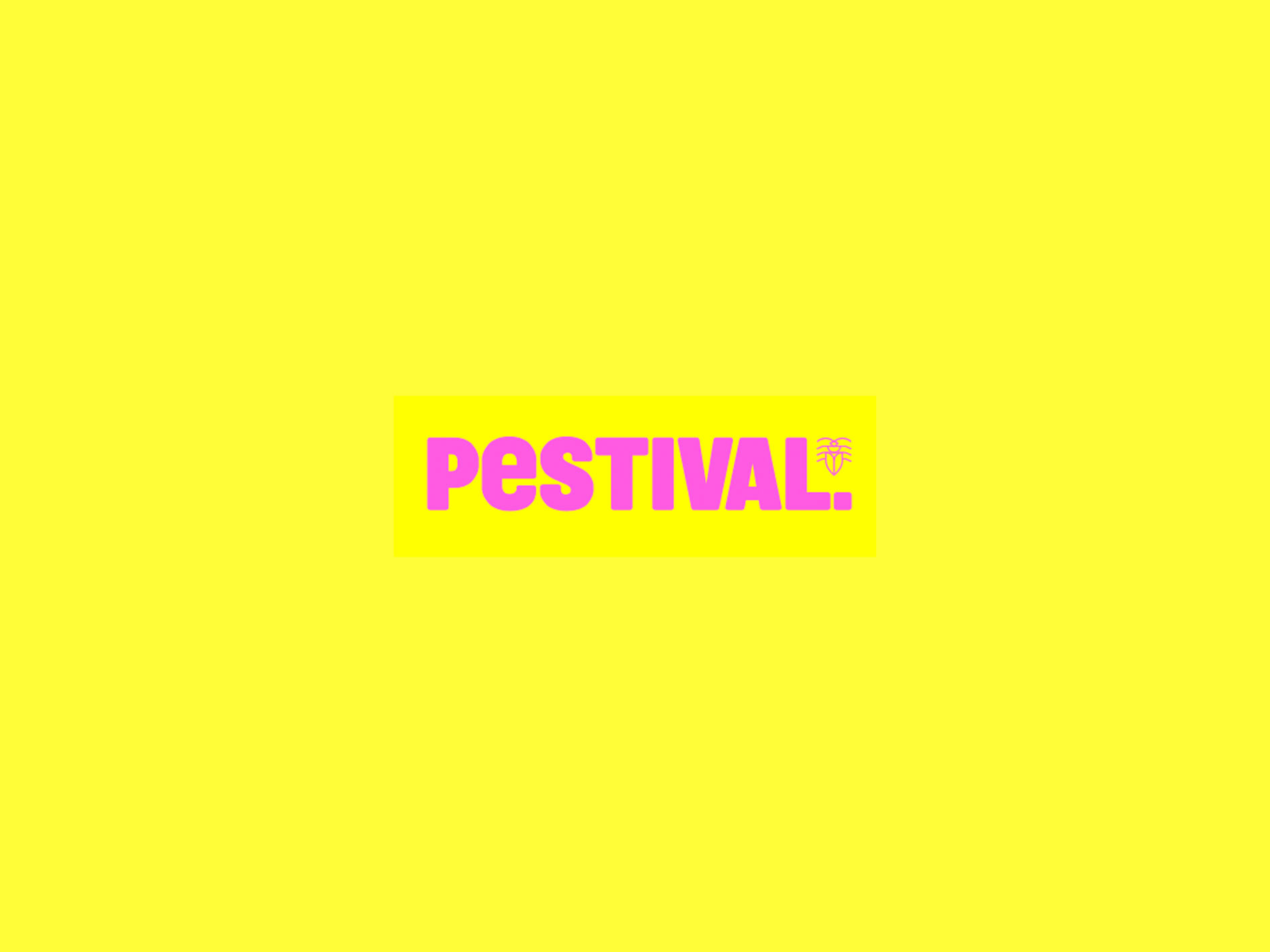
Pestival Logo

Pestival is an international arts festival dedicated to ‘the art of being an insect'. Pestival won the 2010 Observer Ethical Award in Conservation, and had a three year residency at ZSL London Zoo.

It has attracted world-renowned insect experts as well as artists, such as Bob and Roberta Smith, and comedians, most notably Robyn Hitchcock, Robin Ince and Stewart Lee (who mentions his involvement in his stand-up act "41st Best Stand-up Ever").

== Background ==
Pestival is the brainchild of Bridget Nicholls. She came up with the idea in 2004 after going to an insect film festival called FIFI in the Pyrenees (defunct).

== Pestivals by year ==
=== Pestival 2006 ===
Pestival 2006 was held at the London Wetland Centre in Barnes, London. Over 10,000 people attended. It was co-produced along with Mark Pilkington.

=== Pestival 2009 ===
Pestival 2009 was held at the Southbank Centre in London. With 200,000 people attending over three days, it had over 50 free interactive events and numerous experts at the cutting edge of art and science, and was supported by over 260 volunteers.

It featured Blur’s Graham Coxon, Robyn Hitchcock singing insect anthems, Robin Ince’s Bee Comedy Night, an interspecies choir, Softroom Architects iconic Termite Pavilion, artist-in-residence Noboru Tsubaki, live mosquito swarms, Praying Mantis Kung Fu, Bob and Roberta Smith’s Mobile Brownfield Site, insect detectives, maggots who paint, a pollinator themed slow food market, and Valerie Singleton spinning her favourite insect seven inch.

Chris Watson, a sound recordist who specialises in Natural History, and former member of Cabaret Voltaire provided the soundtrack to the Termite Pavilion as well as creating an evening called Cross Pollination that used live voice and the sound of bees.

Pestival 2009 also hosted the symposium How insect are we? at ZSL London Zoo, chaired by New Scientist editor Roger Highfield. Speakers included Stanford University ant expert Deborah Gordon, artist/engineer Natalie Jeremijenko and literary critic Steven Connor.

== See also ==
- List of festivals in the United Kingdom
- Science festivals
