= Mark Pilkington (writer) =

British writer

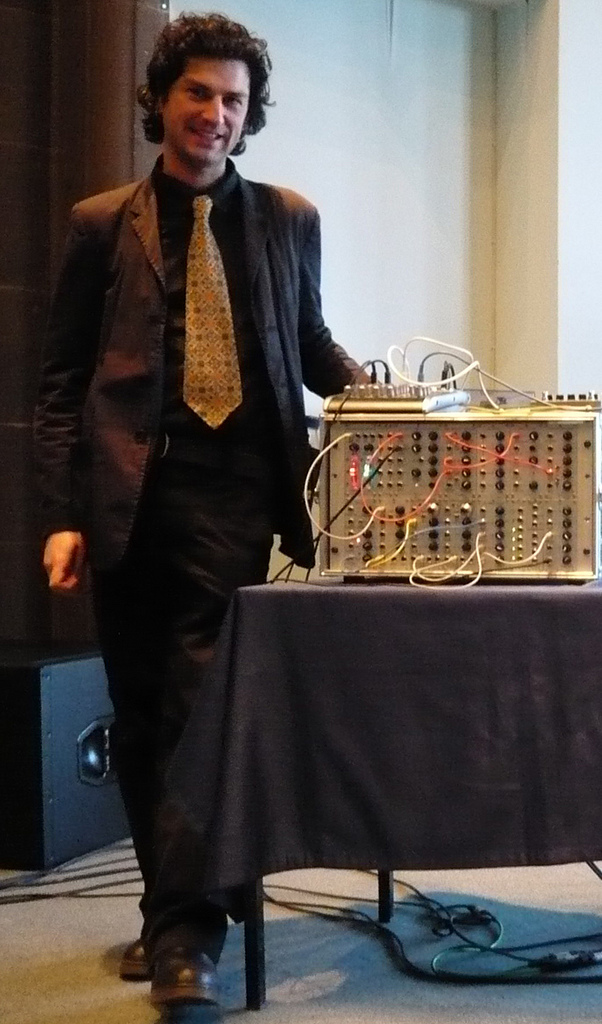
- Mark Pilkington (January 2009)
- Born: 26 February 1973 (age 53); London, England
- Occupations: Writer, publisher, curator and musician; publisher of Strange Attractor Press
- Website: www.strangeattractor.co.uk

Mark Pilkington (born 26 February 1973) is a writer, publisher, curator and musician with particular interest in the fringes of knowledge, culture and belief.

== Career ==
Pilkington has written two books, Mirage Men (2010) and Far Out: 101 Strange Tales from Science's Outer Edge (2007). The latter collects the Far Out science articles Pilkington wrote for The Guardian newspaper between 2003 and 2005.

For Mirage Men (premiered at the Sheffield Doc / Fest in 2013) Pilkington and John Lundberg travelled to America in search of the truth behind the UFO enigma. As they spoke to intelligence agents, disinformation specialists and UFO hunters the pair began to suspect that instead of covering-up stories of crashed spacecraft, alien contacts and secret underground bases for the past 60 years, the US intelligence agencies had been promoting them all along, as part of Cold War psychological warfare and counter-intelligence programmes.

Pilkington's writing has also been published in numerous magazines and anthologies, including The Anomalist, Fortean Times, Frieze, Sight & Sound, The Wire, the Time Out Book of London Walks Vol.2 and London Noir

He has broadcast on Resonance FM, both as a guest, hosting Strange Attractor On Air, and DJing for the Kosmische Club. He has also given presentations to groups, conventions and festivals including Fortean Times Unconvention, Supersonic Festival, London Lore Conference, Litro and Skeptics in the Pub.

Pilkington runs Strange Attractor Press and edits its anthology, Strange Attractor Journal. Other books published by SAP include Medical London by Richard Barnett and Mike Jay, Welcome to Mars by Ken Hollings, Austin Osman Spare by Phil Baker and The Field Guide by Rob Irving and John Lundberg.

As a curator Pilkington has organised events at London venues including the Horse Hospital, the Theosophical Society, Conway Hall and Barnes Wetland Centre. As well as numerous Strange Attractor events from 2001 (initially with John Lundberg) to 2004, he has collaborated on larger projects including Pestival (2006, with Bridget Nicholls) and Megalithomania (2002, with Neil Mortimer of Third Stone Magazine). In 2010 Pilkington curated the Strange Attractor Salon at Viktor Wynd Fine Art in London, an exhibition involving over twenty artists and a programme of talks, performance, music and film.

Pilkington has also played electronics and synthesisers with improvising and experimental musical groups including Rucksack, Raagnagrok, Disinformation, Urthona, The Stargazer's Assistant, High Mountain Tempel, The Stëllä Märis Drönë Örchësträ, Yan Gant y Tan, Indigo Octagon and solo as The Asterism. He has appeared on two CDs by High Mountain Tempel, The Glass Bead Game and Pilgrimage to Thunderbolt Pagoda, Circuit Blasting by Strange Attractor vs Disinformation and Murmurations by Urthona and the Asterism.

In 2012 he appeared in an episode of the second series of Stargazing Live, a BBC 2 series about astronomy.
