= Big Sur UFO =

Reported UFO incident in 1964

The Big Sur UFO is a reported UFO incident that took place during a 1964 Air Force deployment to a mountaintop near Big Sur, California. The mission was to film Atlas missile tests from Vandenberg Air Force Base.

Since 1982, Robert Jacobs, who had overseen the mountaintop team, has claimed the team filmed an "intelligently controlled flying device" that followed a missile and emitted a "beam of energy" to disable the weapon.

Writing in 1993, Kingston George, the project engineer, argued the team had actually recorded the release of decoy warheads and chaff designed to prevent the weapon being intercepted by Soviet defenses. According to George, Jacobs did not have clearance to be told the truth of what they had recorded and mistook decoy deployment as extraterrestrial interference.

== Air Force deployment to Anderson Peak ==
From August to November 1964, the United States Air Force deployed personnel to the mountains of the Los Padres National Forest in California along with a special light-sensitive telescope borrowed from Boston University. Their mission was to "collect low-light-level photography of missile launches into the Air Force Western Test Range from Vandenberg Air Force Base". Lt. Robert Jacobs was the on-site commander for the Big Sur location, which was managed by the 1369th Photo Squadron.

During the deployment, the team successfully captured nine launches from Vandenberg. During one such launch, of an Atlas missile nicknamed "Buzzing Bee", the team was able to capture footage of a re-entry vehicle deploying decoy warheads, a highly-classified technology designed to prevent American nuclear weapons being intercepted by Soviet defenses against ballistic missiles.

== Claims of extra-terrestrials ==
In 1982, Robert Jacobs authored a piece on the incident for the tabloid National Enquirer. Under the sensationalist headline "UFO Spied on Space Missile -- and I Captured It on Film", Jacobs proclaimed that he had been part of a coverup but was breaking his silence because he "felt the American people have a right to know". Jacobs described having seen film in which an unidentified object was shown next to a warhead. According to the story, a senior official asked him "What the hell was that?" to which he replied it was a "UFO". Jacobs was then reminded of his duty to never discuss the film or what he saw ever again.

Florenz Mansmann, a major who was involved in the project, reportedly confirmed the account in a May 1987 letter to a UFO researcher. Jacobs expanded on the piece in 1989 in a UFO journal.

The story gained wider circulation in the 21st century. UFO author Robert Hastings further popularized the story in 2007. In 2021, Jacobs participated in a press conference about his interpretation of the incident.

== Decoy warheads explanation ==
In response to Jacobs' claims of extra-terrestrial interference, Kingston A. George, who had been project engineer during the incident, published a piece in the Skeptical Inquirer disputing Jacobs' claims. George authored a second article in 2009.

George explained that, like Jacobs, he had seen footage he was not actually cleared to see. George reported that, like Jacobs, he was instructed never to speak of it again. George claims that, unlike Jacobs, he was aware of the true purpose of the test, namely to film the deployment of decoy warheads and chaff meant to confuse enemy air defenses. According to George, the lights that Jacobs reported were actually caused not by a UFO energy beam, but by the explosive deployment of decoys and chaff.

In 2025, the Wall Street Journal revealed that hundreds of Air Force personnel had been told, falsely, that there was "a secret program to harvest alien technology". The piece described it as "a long-running practice" that was "like a fraternity hazing ritual that spun wildly out of control." The report also explained that a classified electromagnetic pulse test had been responsible for UFO reports and missiles going offline in 1967, explaining Robert Salas' account.

== See also ==
- UFO reports and disinformation
- Malmstrom UFO incident
