= UFOs: Past, Present, and Future =

- Directed by: Ray Rivas
- Written by: Robert Emenegger; Carol Johnsen
- Produced by: Allan Sandler; Carol Johnsen; James Castle; Bruce Bryant
- Starring: Rod Serling; Burgess Meredith; José Ferrer
- Cinematography: Stan Lazan; Donald Peterman
- Edited by: Ken Lavet; Jack Schrader; Caryl Wickman
- Music by: Robert Emenegger
- Production company: Sandler Institutional Films
- Distributed by: VCI Video Communications, Inc; Cabal Records & Media
- Release date: July 31, 1974
- Running time: 97 minutes
- Country: United States
- Language: English

UFOs: Past, Present, and Future is a 1974 documentary film that examines several prominent sightings of unidentified flying objects (UFOs) from the post-war to contemporary era. It was rereleased in 1976 and 1979 under the title UFOs: It Has Begun to coincide with renewed interest in the subject due to the release of Steven Spielberg's Close Encounters of the Third Kind. It is based on the book UFOs: Past, Present, and Future by Robert Emenegger.

== Overview ==
The film is narrated by Rod Serling, Burgess Meredith, and José Ferrer. Serling and Meredith had previously worked together on The Twilight Zone. The 1979 rerelease features commentary by noted ufologist and astronomer Jacques Vallée. The film uses dramatizations, interviews with government officials and scientists, and selected footage to provide context for UFO sightings, both ancient and contemporary.

== Production ==
In 1971, writer/composer Robert Emenegger was asked by either the U.S. Republican Party, officials at California's Norton Air Force Base, or the U.S. Department of Defense itself to produce a film about UFOs using only official DoD and NASA source material, and was allegedly promised footage of a 1964 landing at Holloman Air Force Base. While a myth held that a few seconds of this special footage ultimately made it into the film, that was later debunked when analysis showed the shot in question was part of the reenactment.

== Synopsis ==
The film opens with Serling asking open-ended philosophical questions about the origin of humanity on Earth, juxtaposing evolution and religion with a variation on ancient astronauts. Serling steps in front of the camera, similar to his routine on The Twilight Zone, and suggests that just as humans look at the sky and question where we came from, so too might extraterrestrial beings.

The story's first vignette takes place outside Lubbock, Texas, on November 2, 1967. Around 11:00 p.m., two men driving in a pickup truck experience engine trouble and radio interference. As they begin to check the engine, a bright white disc-shaped object approaches and shines a bluish beam directly at them. After a moment, it flies away. Once the object disappears, their truck begins to function again, and the men leave to notify the police. Later, an Air Force investigation analyzes their story along with fifteen similar reports, and concludes that the phenomenon of ball lightning is responsible. Serling warns that this may not be the only explanation.

The next section, detailing historical records, opens with Meredith reading from the Book of Ezekiel 1:4-28, which seems to provide an account of creatures who came down from the sky in a ball of fire; each with four faces, four wings, and calf-like feet, then rose back into the sky. Serling describes other ancient religious texts from the Greeks and Romans about "phantom chariots". He also mentions reports that during the reign of Charlemagne, accounts of "tyrants of the air" concerned the ruler so greatly that anyone reporting such aerial objects was to be put to death. Other historical examples include sightings in León, Spain, and an incident in 1887 aboard a ship called the S.S. Siberian. Starting in the late 1890s, sightings of a "flying cigar" were reported across the U.S., including in Oakland, California, and Denver, Colorado.

A young Jacques Vallée then attempts to dispel the notion that UFO sightings were limited to the United States. He describes a wave of sightings that occurred in the late 1940s and 1950s in Scandinavia, Mexico, the Soviet Union, China, and the western coast of Africa. In 1973, a team led by a Jean Balgou of the Astrophysical Institute flew in a Concorde jet packed with scientists. At high altitude and in the midst of a total eclipse, he uses a stop-motion camera to photograph the sun rising over the horizon, and captures a suspicious object. While NASA takes no official position on the existence of UFOs, several astronauts on the Gemini, Apollo, and Skylab missions have come forward with their own anomalous observations and photographs.

Analyzed next are reports from former military officials and scientists. According to testimony from former U.S. Air Force officials, the Department of Defense first became interested in the UFO phenomenon in the late 1940s, concerned that it may constitute a military threat from a foreign power. The Air Force began a formal investigation under Project Sign which, after only two weeks, was complicated by the death of airman Capt. Mantell, an experienced pilot who crashed under suspicious circumstances outside Louisville, Kentucky. Public pressure was growing for answers, but the results of the investigation were classified and later reportedly shelved by USAF General Hoyt Vandenberg due to insufficient evidence. Several UFOs recorded by radar over the U.S. capital reportedly were important enough for President Harry S. Truman to request being personally informed on all developments in the case. An F-94 intercept over Washington, D.C., caused all unknown radar signs to disappear once the fighters entered the city. As the fighters left D.C. airspace, the unknown objects reappeared. The confusion resulted in "the largest, and longest, press conference in the Pentagon since World War II". The radar issues were blamed on temperature inversion.

On January 14, 1953, the Central Intelligence Agency became involved, convening a panel of top scientists to further explore the phenomenon and its potential threat to national security. An analysis concluded that the objects filmed in several high-profile sightings were not aircraft, balloons, or birds, but that they were instead "self-luminous, unidentified objects". However, the panel rejected this analysis and endorsed the bird hypothesis.

In 1966, an incident outside Ann Arbor pushes U.S. Representative Gerald Ford to set up a congressional hearing on UFOs, and it is opened by L. Mendel Rivers, then-chair of the House Armed Services Committee.

Several unexplained animal mutilations of livestock are examined. While the official explanation is usually predation, interviews with ranchers suggest that they were not the result of predatory animals. The incisions in the animals do not conform to those made by steel tools, seemingly ruling out human behavior.

The film's conclusion begins with a brief overview of possible aircraft shapes, and a number of illustrations of extraterrestrials featured from Emenegger's book. A roundtable discussion featuring several of the film's scientists revolves around the perceived hubris of mankind in believing we are the only sentient life in the universe.

=== Holloman landing story ===
In contrast with the blonde 1950s Nordic aliens and the large-headed small-bodied malevolent Gray Aliens of the late 20th century , Emenegger's influential 1974 film featured artist impressions of muscular blue-skinned human-like saucer occupants. Later UFO lore described some "good guy" aliens as having light blue skin.

Finally, a dramatized scenario of what may have occurred at Holloman Air Force Base is told by Serling. Three unidentified objects are detected approaching Holloman. Base Command proceeds to contact Edwards AFB. An attempt is made to establish communication with the objects without success. A red alert is sounded, and fighters take off. A helicopter with a professional photographer aboard is in the air and shoots several feet of film. One of the craft breaks away, and seems to attempt a landing. A crew on the ground films several hundred more feet of footage. The vehicle hovers silently, perhaps ten feet (3.0 m) off the ground, before landing on three extension pads. Several Air Force officials and scientists at the base wait outside as the craft's panel opens:

Stepping forward are one, then two, and a third of what appear to be men, dressed in tight-fitting jumpsuits. Perhaps short, by our standards. With an odd blue-grey complexion, eyes set far apart, a large pronounced nose, they wear a headpiece that resembles a ropelike design. The commander and two scientists step forward to greet the visitors. Arrangements are made by some sort of communication, and the group quickly retires to an inner office in the "King 1" area. Left behind stand a stunned group of military personnel. Who the visitors are, and where they're from, and what they want, is unknown.

== Cast ==
- Rod Serling - Narrator
- Burgess Meredith - Narrator
- José Ferrer - Narrator
- Jacques Vallée - Narrator
- J. Allen Hynek - Interviewee
- Colonel Robert Friend, USAF - Interviewee
- Colonel William Coleman, USAF former Project Blue Book spokesman - Interviewee
- Colonel George Weinbrenner, former head of Foreign Technology at Wright-Patterson AFB - Interviewee

== Reception and legacy ==
In 1976, The Miami News reporter Marilyn Moore called it "a fine presentation on the topic, narrated by the late Rod Serling which serves as a sad reminder of the many excellent shows he gave us over the years."

According to Jason Colavito, sources conflict as to if the movie was commissioned by Republicans or Nixon for political purposes, but stated: "It is clear that no one—not the government, or Rod Serling, or anyone else involved in this film—checked any of the facts at all before declaring that aliens and humans have long been interacting."

The Holloman landing sequence has been noted for its similarities to the finale of the later Spielberg film Close Encounters of the Third Kind.

== Awards and nominations ==
The film was nominated for Best Documentary Film at the 33rd Golden Globe Awards. It lost to Youthquake!

== See also ==
- Unidentified Flying Objects: The True Story of Flying Saucers, a similar film from 1956
- UFO Cover Up? Live, a similar TV broadcast from 1988
- UFO reports and disinformation
