= UFO Cover Up? Live =

- Directed by: Martin Pasetta
- Written by: Barry Taff; Tracy Tormé
- Produced by: Michael B. Seligman
- Starring: Mike Farrell
- Edited by: Bob Demaio; Scott Reynolds
- Music by: Joey Carbone; Jerry Lambert
- Production company: BizNet Studios
- Distributed by: Lexington Broadcast Services Company
- Release date: October 14, 1988
- Running time: 2 hours
- Country: United States
- Language: English

UFO Cover Up? Live (also known as UFO... The Unsolved Mystery on VHS releases) was a U.S. television broadcast which aired in syndication on October 14, 1988. The program introduced Americans to the Majestic 12, which many skeptics and ufologists alike consider to be a hoax. It featured the first public mention of Nevada's Area 51 as a site associated with aliens.

== Synopsis ==
The program was hosted by actor Mike Farrell, best known for his role as Captain B. J. Hunnicutt on the television series M*A*S*H (1975–83). Despite being prerecorded, the program imitated the style of a live broadcast and advertised itself as "via satellite".

The program featured former Project Blue Book spokesman William T. Coleman, former Blue Book head Robert Friend, and SETI figure Thomas Redmond McDonough. It discussed the 1952 Washington, D.C., UFO incident, the subsequent Samford press conference, the 1948 Mantell UFO incident wherein a pilot crashed while chasing a UFO, and the 1976 Tehran UFO incident. Accused hoaxers, including George Adamski and Billy Meier, were discussed. Soviet ufologists Sergei Bulantsev and Leonard Nikishin were interviewed about Soviet events, including the Tunguska blast of 1908. Budd Hopkins and psychiatrist Rima E. Laibow were interviewed about their work with people who reported recovered memories of alien abductions. Bill Moore, Stanton Friedman, and Jesse Marcel Jr. were interviewed about the Roswell incident. Robert Emenegger and Paul Shartle were interviewed about the Holloman UFO incident, wherein a UFO allegedly landed near Holloman Air Force Base. UFO author Richard F. Haines was interviewed, as were multiple pilots such as Neil Daniels. Also interviewed were skeptics David Williamson, James Oberg, and Herbert Spiegel. The program featured clips from films such as Earth vs the Flying Saucers, Plan 9 from Outer Space, Devil Girl from Mars, and Close Encounters of the Third Kind.

Drawing upon the work of ufologists Bill Moore and Jaime Shandera, the program interviewed shadow-clad informants Falcon (Richard C. Doty; intel and counter-intel officer from AFOSI - Air Force Office of Special Investigations) and Condor (Robert M. Collins; intel and counter-intel officer from AFOSI) about the Majestic 12 documents. Falcon (Doty) told a story of three aliens (called "extraterrestrial biological entities" or EBEs) that were "guests" of the United States government, one of which was fond of strawberry ice cream. Falcon claimed the aliens came from Zeta Reticuli. Condor and Falcon claimed that the U.S. government and the aliens had entered into an agreement to allow them to operate a base in Nevada called Area 51.

== Reactions ==
External videos
- Bill Moore addresses MUFON, July 1 1989

UFO author Philip J. Imbrogno argued the program, with its mention of an alien who likes strawberry ice cream, "made many viewers laugh at the show, and in effect made the study of the phenomenon look downright silly". At the 1989 MUFON International Symposium in Las Vegas, Bill Moore claimed to have been involved in alleged clandestine activities throughout the eighties. According to James W. Moseley and Karl T. Pflock in the book Shockingly Close to the Truth! Confessions of a Grave-Robbing Ufologist:

… he delivered a long speech in which he confessed—or at least claimed—to having been in league with agents of U.S. intelligence in the early 1980s. He said he'd provided these agents with "harmless" information on various luminaries of saucerdom and even fed (harmless?) disinformation to [the UFO field] at their behest. This he did in the hope he would be given important inside saucer scoop. Instead, he said, he got only "crumbs." He also admitted that some of what Falcon and another Aviarian called Condor had said in the video clips shown during the UFO Cover Up?—Live program the previous October wasn't true—but he didn't reveal what should or shouldn't be believed.

Stanton Friedman later wrote that he regretted his participation, complaining about reading off teleprompters and being disturbed by Moore's private revelation prior to airing that Falcon and Condor might disseminate disinformation. Friedman explained:

When Bill stated that he thought Falcon and Condor, whose interviews he had arranged, might put out some disinformation, I found that unacceptable. If you have any reason to believe that somebody's putting out disinformation, you don't use them.

UFO author Bill Knell argued the program "brought the U.F.O Phenomenon into more U.S. households than anything anyone else has done in years".

Bob Lazar, one of John Lear's many UFO associates, recalled watching the special when it was broadcast on October 14. Lear and Lazar travelled to the Groom Lake area multiple times in the ensuing months. Lazar would thereafter publicly claim he had briefly worked at the base trying to reverse engineer alien flying saucers.

UFO Cover Up? Live influenced Chris Carter's 1990s hit television show The X-Files.

== See also ==
- Unidentified Flying Objects: The True Story of Flying Saucers, a similar film from 1956
- UFOs: Past, Present, and Future, a similar film from 1974
- UFO reports and disinformation
