= Robert Salas =

Ufologist and military officer

Robert L. Salas
- Education: U.S. Air Force Academy
- Political party: Democratic Party
- Military career
- Allegiance: United States
- Branch: United States Air Force
- Rank: Captain

Robert L. Salas is a ufologist and former United States Air Force officer. A graduate of the U.S. Air Force Academy, Salas served on active duty in the continental United States for seven years before resigning his commission. He later worked for the Federal Aviation Administration (FAA) and ran for United States Congress.

Beginning in the late 1990s, Salas received widespread publicity for his claims that UFOs disabled a missile flight he was crewing in 1967. Later investigations confirmed that Salas' missile flight was, indeed, disabled, though the matter was due to the nearby test of an electromagnetic pulse simulator.

== Early life and education ==
Robert Salas graduated from the United States Air Force Academy and received a master's degree in aerospace engineering from the Air Force Institute of Technology.

== Career ==
Salas served on active U.S. Air Force duty for seven years, during which he was an ICBM launch controller and missile propulsion engineer and was variously posted to Florida, Montana, and Ohio.

In 1971, Salas resigned his Air Force commission because, he says, the Vietnam War "got too much for me to stomach". He briefly thereafter worked for Martin-Marietta and Rockwell International, before going to work for the FAA in 1974, from which he retired in about 1995. After retirement, from 1999 to 2016, he worked as a math teacher.

In 2020, Salas unsuccessfully ran for United States House of Representatives from California's 26th congressional district.

=== Ufology ===
In 1994, Salas read a book by UFO author Timothy Good and came to believe an incident he experienced in 1967 was the result of UFO intervention. As first recounted by Salas in a 1996 interview he gave to the Great Falls Tribune, while manning a missile launch control center in Montana, he received a call from an Air Force Security Police officer charged with guarding the center. Salas said the second-hand report he received from the guard was of a "glowing red object" that appeared to be hovering in the air. According to Salas, ICBMs at his Echo complex site lost power shortly thereafter. Sometime after reading Good's book, Salas began to believe that intergalactic forces had interceded to save the world from nuclear conflict. In later years, Salas also began to claim that he was abducted by grey aliens from his home in 1985.

Salas would write three books about UFOs; speak at UFO conferences; appear as a guest on several episodes of Coast to Coast AM; and give interviews regarding UFOs on the Julie Mason Show on SiriusXM, ABC News, and other media outlets.

A later investigation determined the loss of power and visual disturbance Salas reported were due to the nearby test of an electromagnetic pulse simulator.

== Personal life ==
According to Salas, he admires Nancy Pelosi and Greta Thunberg, and seeks to model himself after Pelosi and Adam Schiff. He lives in Ojai, California.

Salas is twice married and has a son.

== Works ==
- Salas, Robert (2005). Faded Giant. BookSurge. ISBN 1419603418.
- Salas, Robert (2014). Unidentified: The UFO Phenomenon: How World Governments Have Conspired to Conceal Humanity's Biggest Secret. Weiser. ISBN 978-1601633422.
- Salas, Robert (2023). UAPs and the Nuclear Puzzle: Visitations, National Security, and the Need for Transparency. New Page Books. ISBN 978-1637480168.

== Electoral history ==
California's 26th congressional district, primary election (2020)
Party	Candidate	Votes	%
Democratic	Julia Brownley	106,141	55.8
Republican	Ronda Kennedy	67,579	26.1
Democratic	Robert Salas	12,717	6.7
Democratic	Enrique Petris	3,624	1.9
Total votes		190,061	100

== See also ==
- Disclosure movement
- Malmstrom UFO incident
