= Oscar-qualifying release =

Minimal theatrical run to qualify for Academy Awards

An Oscar-qualifying release, sometimes also called four walling, (Note: The term four walling is also used more broadly to refer to the practice of a producer paying a theater to screen his film.) is the nominal theatrical run of a direct-to-video or direct-to-digital motion picture to meet the minimum eligibility requirements of the Academy Awards.

Because the Academy Awards require theatrical showing of an entrant film for award consideration, many productions unable to achieve non-video or non-digital release nonetheless screen in a very limited number of theaters in order to qualify for possible awards nomination. In many cases, the producer will pay the theater to screen the film.

The requirements for an Oscar-qualifying release as of 2025 include a film being shown for one-week in a theater located in Dallas, Texas; Los Angeles, California; New York, New York; the San Francisco Bay Area; Chicago, Illinois; Miami, Florida; or Atlanta, Georgia. To be considered for the Academy Award for Best Picture, a more stringent theatrical showing requirement is in place, requiring showing in multiple cities.

Some independent theaters provide producers "Oscar-qualifying" packages. For instance, as of 2025 the Roxie Theater in San Francisco, California charges makers of short films $950 to screen their production for one week in order to achieve awards eligibility.
