= Malmstrom UFO incident =

Alleged 1967 event in Montana, US

Coordinates: 47°29′1″N 109°20′57″W

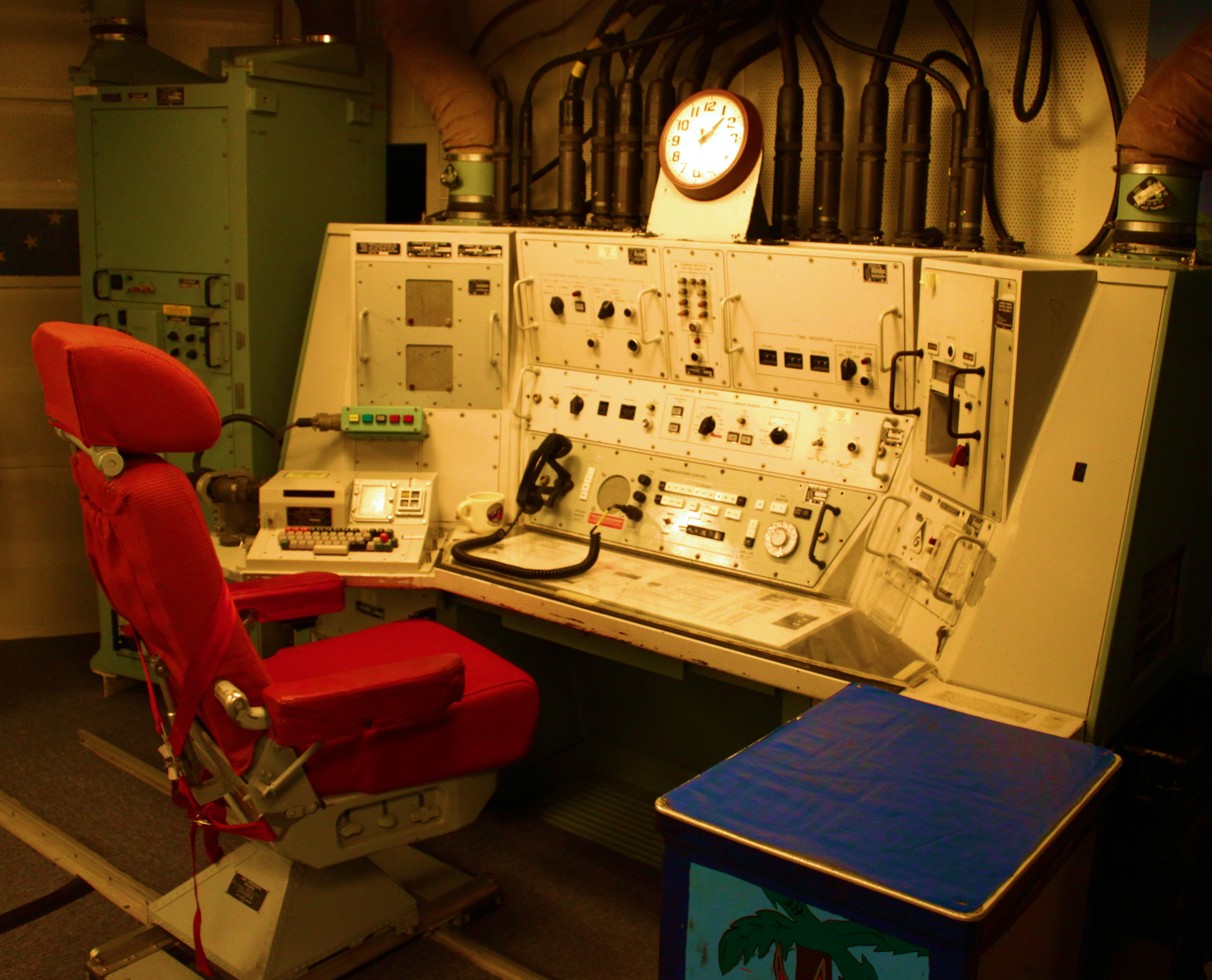
A Minuteman launch control center

In 1996, retired Air Force personnel claimed that a weapons failure at a Montana nuclear missile complex in 1967 was connected to reports of a UFO sighting over Malmstrom Air Force Base. The claims became known in ufology and popular culture as the Malmstrom UFO incident. Skeptics argue the UFO was likely the planet Mars and entirely unrelated to the malfunction. A military investigation found no connection to any UFO sighting. A 2025 Pentagon report revealed the incident had been caused by a classified test of an electromagnetic pulse device.

== 1967 missile complex malfunction ==
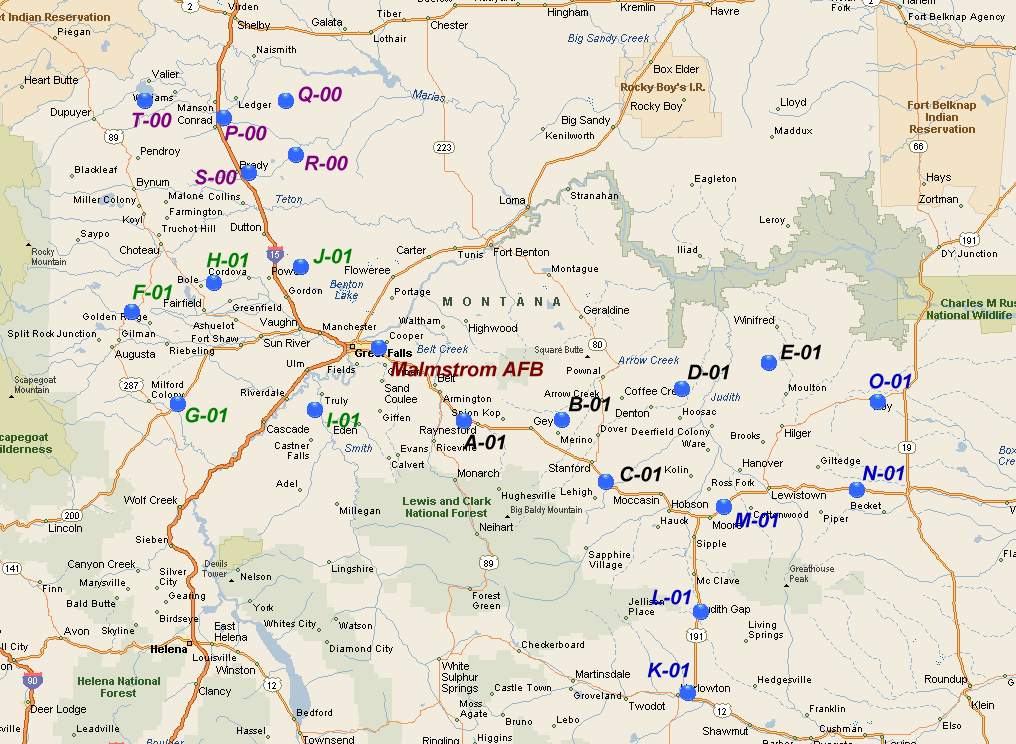
Map of the missile facilities operated by 341st Missile Wing. Echo flight is labelled 'E'.

In 1967, personnel from Malmstrom operated an underground missile complex that was located between Hilger and Winifred, given the designation "Echo Flight". An Air Force report noted that "On 16 March 1967 at 0845, all sites in Echo (E) Flight, Malmstrom AFB, shut-down with No-Go indications... All [launch facilities] in E Flight lost strategic alert nearly simultaneously. No other Wing I configuration lost strategic alert at that time." The report continued: "Rumors of Unidentified Flying Objects (UFO) around the area of Echo Flight during the time of the fault were disproven. A Mobile Strike Team, which had checked all November Flight's [launch facilities] on the morning of 16 March 67, were question[ed] and stated that no unusual activity or sightings were observed."

The malfunction, termed the "Echo Flight Incident", required maintenance crews to be dispatched to the complex. The missiles were brought back online within a day.

== Public claims by Robert Salas ==
On August 13, 1996, the Great Falls Tribune published an article about Robert Salas and his story of a UFO report associated with the Echo Flight malfunction. Robert Salas had been a 26-year-old Air Force lieutenant during the 1967 malfunction.

According to Salas, on the night of the malfunction, he was assigned to the underground capsule at the complex. According to him, a security guard on the surface contacted him to report flying objects in the distance doing strange maneuvers; later, guards reported seeing a glowing red object hovering above the front gate. According to Salas, minutes later the complex's ten Minutemen nuclear missiles went offline. The red object reportedly disappeared and maintenance crews took a full day to restore the system to operational status.

In the August 1996 piece, Salas denies being a "UFO junkie" and doesn't suggest extra-terrestrial involvement; he further says he wants to find answers to the mystery, requesting anyone with information to contact him.

== Promotion in media ==
In 2000, the story began to be covered in papers through the region.

In 2001, the incident was featured in the Missoula Independent. That year, Air Force documents on the incident were released under the Freedom of Information Act. The Independent returned to the topic the following year.

External documents
- 2001 FOIA response on Malmstrom UFO incident

In 2005, Salas authored Faded Giant on the topic of UFOs. By 2005, Salas speculated the government was covering up evidence of extraterrestrials in order to exploit their technology for weaponry. In 2008, UFO author Robert Hastings discussed the incident in his book UFOs and Nukes. Salas authored a letter to the editor defending the book from criticism by skeptics.

On September 27, 2010, Salas appeared at the National Press Club in Washington D.C., along with other UFO speakers. In 2014, Salas authored a second book Unidentified: The UFO Phenomenon. In 2017, the Great Falls Tribune marked the event's 50th anniversary. In 2023, Salas authored a third book: UAPs and the Nuclear Puzzle.

== Skeptical views ==
Science writer Mick West wrote that the military investigated at the time and found no connection to any UFO sighting, but the story has remained in UFO culture largely due to the promotional efforts of Salas. Skeptical investigators maintain they have found numerous issues with Robert Salas’s account.

According to Brian Dunning, Salas memories differ from records of the 341st Strategic Missile Wing, which show that nobody had reported anything unusual on the night he claims UFOs were seen. Dunning wrote that on March 16, Echo Flight missiles were restarted following a commonplace commercial power failure, "and eight days later, some people reported a UFO to the newspapers in a town 50km away. There is no rational reason to conclude one thing had anything to do with the other". Dunning speculated that Salas was "honestly mistaken in piecing together certain memories, and I also believe he's become invested in his version of the recollection and has erred on the side of confirmation bias".

In 2008, Salas appeared on CNN along with skeptic Michael Shermer. When asked if he believed Salas was lying, Shermer replied "No, not at all. I think we're not always reliable observers. It's hard to say. We misunderstand, honestly misunderstand or misperceive things. I think before we say something is out of this world, let's first make sure that it's not in it. And just because we can't explain something doesn't mean it's, you know, extraterrestrial."

Skeptic Robert Sheaffer argued the UFO sighted was likely Mars, writing: "So, in the case of Oscar Flight, a UFO was sighted [very likely Mars], but no missiles went offline. In the case of Echo Flight, missiles did go offline due to an electronic glitch, but UFOs had nothing to do with it. I can't un-complicate it any more than that."

== Pentagon explanation ==
In 2025, the Pentagon reported that incident had actually been caused by a test of a nuclear electromagnetic pulse device.

== See also ==
- Big Sur UFO
