= Robert Hastings (ufologist) =

American ufologist (born 1950)

Robert Lambert Hastings
- Born: May 6, 1950 (age 76); Albuquerque, New Mexico, USA
- Education: Ohio University; San Joaquin Delta College
- Occupations: UFO researcher, author
- Website: www.ufohastings.com

Robert Lambert Hastings (born May 6, 1950), or Robert L. Hastings, is an American ufologist, author, and filmmaker known for claims regarding UFOs and Malmstrom Air Force Base. Hastings believes the earth is "being visited by beings from another world, who for whatever reason have taken an interest in the nuclear arms race" and claims that "a global conspiracy exists in which all major governments have been covering up evidence of UFOs for decades."

== Early life and Malmstrom incident ==
Hastings was born in Albuquerque, New Mexico. His father, Robert E. Hastings, was a member of the United States Air Force and was stationed at the Malmstrom Air Force Base in Great Falls, Montana. As a teenager, Robert worked at the Malmstrom Air Force Base air traffic control tower as a janitor. In March 1967, he and air traffic controllers claim they witnessed the radar tracking of five UFOs maneuvering near nuclear missile silos.

== Education and career ==
Hastings received a BFA in Photography at Ohio University in 1972 and later worked as a photographic technician at Northern Illinois University from 1973 to 1981. Between 1981 and 2017, he spoke at more than 500 US colleges and universities claiming that the U.S. government has covered-up evidence of UFOs. He studied electron microscopy between 1986 and 1988 at San Joaquin Delta College. From 1988 to 2002, Hastings worked as a laboratory analyst at Philips Semiconductors in Albuquerque, New Mexico.

Over the years, Hastings has interviewed over 160 veterans regarding claimed UFO incursions at nuclear weapons facilities. He compiled the interviews into the book titled UFOs & Nukes: Extraordinary Encounters at Nuclear Weapons Sites, which was first published in 2008. The second edition was published in 2017. In 2016, he directed the documentary UFOs and Nukes: The Secret Link Revealed, featuring several of the veterans he interviewed for the similarly titled book. On September 27, 2010, he hosted a press conference at the National Press Club in Washington D.C.

According to skeptical author Benjamin Radford, Hasting's claims lack "new evidence or real proof" but instead are "merely a rehashing of old, discredited reports that didn't yield any significant evidence when they were originally reported decades ago."

== Bibliography ==
- UFOs & Nukes: Extraordinary Encounters at Nuclear Weapons Sites (2017). CreateSpace Independent Publishing Platform. ISBN 978-1-5448-2219-8.
- Confession: Our Hidden Alien Encounters Revealed (2019), with Dr. Bob Jacobs. Independently published. ISBN 978-1-6956-8885-8.
