= UFO conspiracy theories =

Claims of an alien visitation cover-up

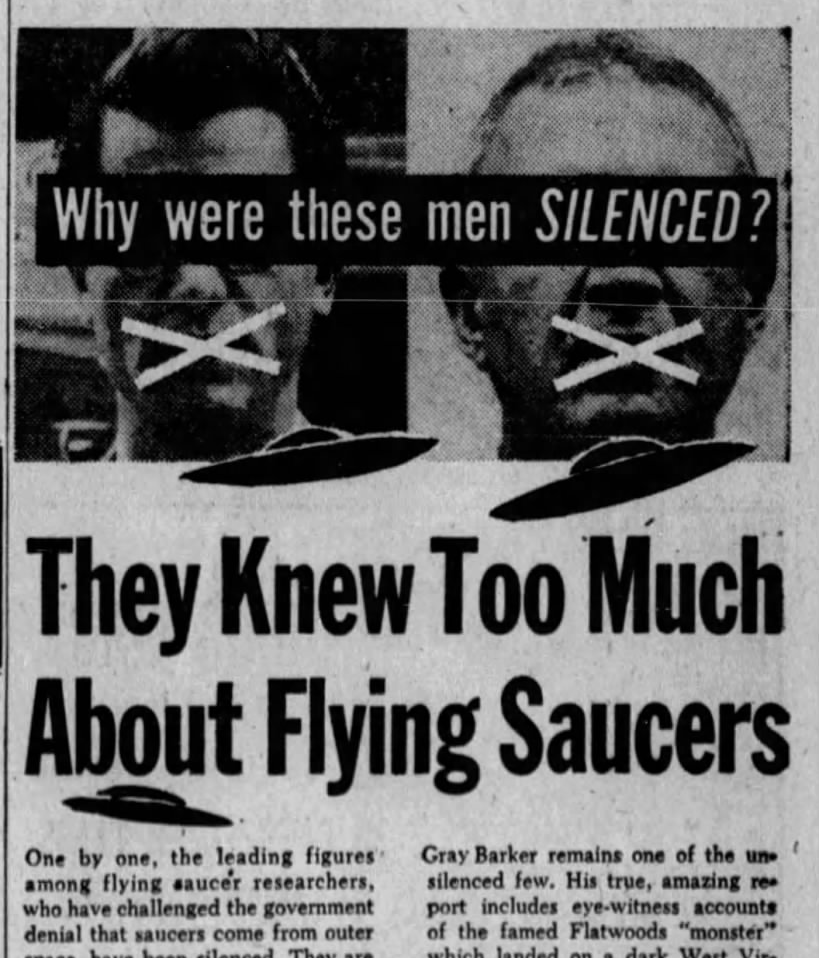
1956 advertisement, formatted similar to a newspaper article, for the book They Knew Too Much About Flying Saucers which promoted a conspiracy theory that government agents were silencing UFO witnesses (Los Angeles Times, June 24, 1956).

UFO conspiracy theories allege that governments, particularly that of the United States, are hiding evidence that some unidentified flying objects (UFOs) are alien spacecraft or use alien technology. Some versions claim that officials recovered crashed spacecraft or alien bodies. Others allege that officials made agreements with extraterrestrials that allowed alien abductions or cattle mutilations. Government investigations have found no verifiable evidence of an alien cover-up. Scientists and skeptical investigators have attributed many UFO reports to human technology or natural phenomena, and some reports have turned out to be hoaxes.

Early versions appeared in pulp science fiction around the time of the 1947 flying disc craze. In the years that followed, Donald Keyhoe popularized the claim that the U.S. Air Force knew flying saucers came from other planets and was keeping that knowledge from the public. The Roswell incident became a prominent example after claims of a crashed alien spacecraft and a government cover-up reached a wider audience in 1980. In the 1980s, some theorists went further and accused officials of working with hostile aliens.

A government UFO cover-up became a plot device in films such as Close Encounters of the Third Kind and television series such as The X-Files. UFO conspiracy theories have also figured in some new religious movements.

By the early 2000s, groups in the disclosure movement were calling for the release of U.S. government records they believed would document contact with aliens. The subject returned to the news in 2017 when The New York Times reported on a Pentagon program that investigated UFO sightings. In 2023, David Grusch claimed that the government and its contractors had kept the recovery of UFOs and attempts to reverse-engineer them secret.

== Mainstream views ==
While unusual sightings have been reported in the sky throughout history, UFOs became culturally prominent after World War II, escalating during the Space Age. Studies and investigations into UFO reports conducted by governments (such as Project Blue Book in the United States and Project Condign in the United Kingdom), as well as by organizations and individuals have occurred over the years without confirmation of the fantastical claims of small but vocal groups of ufologists who favour unconventional or pseudoscientific hypotheses, often claiming that UFOs are evidence of extraterrestrial intelligence, technologically advanced cryptids, demons, interdimensional contact or future time travelers. After decades of promotion of such ideas by believers and in popular media, the kind of evidence required to solidly support such claims has not been forthcoming. Scientists and skeptic organizations such as the Committee for Skeptical Inquiry have provided prosaic explanations for UFOs, namely that they are caused by natural phenomena, human technology, delusions, and hoaxes. Beliefs surrounding UFOs have inspired parts of new religions even as social scientists have identified the ongoing interest and storytelling surrounding UFOs as a modern example of folklore and mythology understandable with psychosocial explanations.

Benjamin Radford has pointed out how unlikely such suppression of evidence is given that "[t]he UFO coverup conspiracy would have to span decades, cross international borders, and transcend political administrations" and that "all of the world's governments, in perpetuity, regardless of which political party is in power and even among enemies, [would] have colluded to continue the coverup."

== Notable proponents ==
A wide variety of people have publicly promoted the idea of a conspiracy to cover up UFOs.

A number of theorists achieved prominence for their claims. Donald Keyhoe was the most prominent proponent of UFO conspiracy theories during the 1950s. In the late 1960s and 1970s, Jacques Vallée and J. Allen Hynek were notable voices alleging a "Cosmic Watergate"; both were involved in the blockbuster Close Encounters of the Third Kind. In the 1980s, Stanton Friedman rose to prominence after describing the Roswell incident as a conspiracy. In the 2010s, Luis Elizondo rose to prominence for his claims of a US government cover-up.

Other proponents were less prominent. Richard Shaver, one early proponent, had been hospitalized for psychiatric problems, while another, Paul Bennewitz, was hospitalized for paranoia after being deceived by Richard C. Doty. Several proponents later confessed responsibility for hoaxes or lies, including Gray Barker, Carl Allen, Richard Doty, Bill Moore, and Ray Santelli. Other proponents met violent ends—Morris Jessup and James E. McDonald died by suicide. John Lear helped promote both Bill Cooper and Bob Lazar — Cooper broke with Lear and was years later shot and killed by law enforcement during an attempted arrest.

High-profile individuals who have suggested that UFO evidence is being suppressed include United States Senator Barry Goldwater, British Admiral Lord Hill-Norton (former NATO head and chief of the British Defence Staff), American Vice Admiral Roscoe H. Hillenkoetter (first CIA director), astronauts Gordon Cooper and Edgar Mitchell. 21st century proponents include former Canadian Defence Minister Paul Hellyer, Stanford University immunologist Garry Nolan, and Israeli brigadier general Haim Eshed (former director of space programs for the Israel Ministry of Defense), In 2017, To The Stars Inc. was founded by Jim Semivan, Harold E. Puthoff, and Tom DeLonge. Luis Elizondo and David Grusch were notable proponents in the 2020s. Beyond their testimonies and reports they have presented no evidence to substantiate their statements and claims.

Theoretical physicist, Avi Loeb, claimed that interstellar objects, such as comets 1I/ʻOumuamua and 3I/ATLAS, and the meteor CNEOS 2014-01-08, are remnants of alien spacecraft. Some of Loeb's claims have been described as conspiracy theories, with USA Today referring to Loeb's speculation about 3I/ATLAS as an "outlandish conspiracy theor[y]."

== In popular fiction ==
Works of popular fiction have included premises and scenes in which a government intentionally prevents disclosure to its populace of the discovery of extraterrestrial intelligence.

The 1960s saw conspiracy films like 2001: A Space Odyssey (as well as the novel),. The 1970s saw the UFO conspiracy discussed briefly in Jack Nicholson vehicle Easy Rider, and in-depth in the Steven Spielberg films Close Encounters of the Third Kind. The 1980s saw Spielberg return to the topic with E.T. the Extra-Terrestrial while Disney's Flight of the Navigator introduced UFO conspiracy theories to a childhood audience. The 1990s saw UFO conspiracy theories in films like Total Recall, Independence Day, and Men in Black. Television series and films including The X-Files, Dark Skies, and Stargate have also featured efforts by governments to conceal information about extraterrestrial beings. In March 2001, former astronaut and United States Senator John Glenn appeared on an episode of the TV series Frasier playing a fictional version of himself who confesses to a UFO cover-up.

The plot of the Sidney Sheldon novel The Doomsday Conspiracy involves a UFO conspiracy, as did the plot of the 2021 series American Horror Story: Double Feature.

== In religion ==
Scholars of religion have identified some new religious movements among the proponents of UFO conspiracy theories, most notably the Nation of Islam, Scientology, and Heaven's Gate.

Mormon cosmology teaches that the Earth is not unique, but that it is one of many inhabited planets, with each planet created for the purpose of bringing about the "immortality and eternal life" (i.e., the exaltation) of humanity. One author observes "there has long been an association between UFOs and The Church of Jesus Christ of Latter-day Saints".

Theosophists and occultists had long claimed knowledge of extraterrestrial beings. In 1946, Meade Layne achieved national notoriety when the wire service carried his claims to be in telepathic communication with people in a space ship. Other "contactees" like George Adamski and George Hunt Williamson similarly had backgrounds in Theosophy. Guy Warren Ballard, founder of the UFO religion "I AM" Activity, had a background in Theosophy.

In the years following the 1931 Japanese invasion of Manchuria, Nation of Islam founder W. D. Fard introduced the concept of The Mother Plane: an apocalyptic Japanese weapon of war. During the ensuing decades, the Mother Plane became identified with UFOs.

1950s UFO religions included Unarius and the Aetherius Society. In the 1950s, L. Ron Hubbard, a pulp fiction author in Raymond Palmer's magazines and a practitioner of Aleister Crowley's Thelema, founded the new religious movement Scientology. In the late 1960s, Hubbard began to secretly teach of Xenu, an extraterrestrial who conspired to turn ancient Earth into a prison for immortal souls. In the 1970s, UFO religion Raëlism formed; in 2002 the group achieved notoriety for its unverified claims to have performed human cloning.

In 1997, rumors spread that a spaceship was trailing the Hale-Bopp comet. On March 26, 1997, law enforcement discovered the bodies of the 39 active members of Heaven's Gate religious group. They had participated in a coordinated series of ritual suicides, coinciding with the closest approach of Comet Hale–Bopp.

== Chronology of UFO conspiracy theories ==
=== 1940s ===
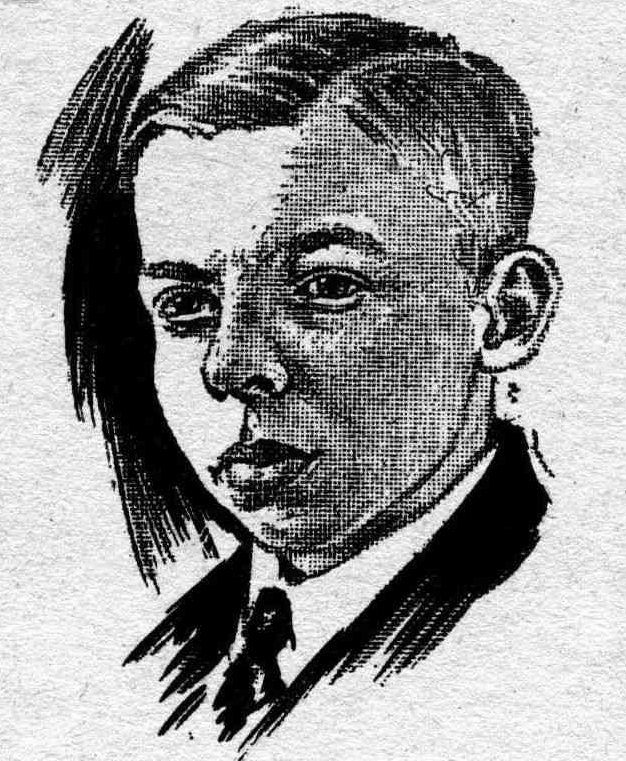
Raymond Palmer, called "the man who invented flying saucers"

UFO conspiracy theories began in 1940s pulp magazine edited by Raymond Palmer, known as "the man who invented flying saucers". For years prior to the 1947 flying disc craze, Palmer had published reports of strange craft in his pulp sci-fi magazine Amazing Stories. During the 1947 flying disc craze, Palmer hired original saucer witness Kenneth Arnold to investigate a flying disc report near Maury Island, Washington. By October 1947, Palmer's magazine featured claims that the truth behind the discs was being covered up. Palmer would continue to promote UFO conspiracy theories for the rest of his life, eventually linking them to the JFK assassination and Watergate.

==== Richard Shaver ====
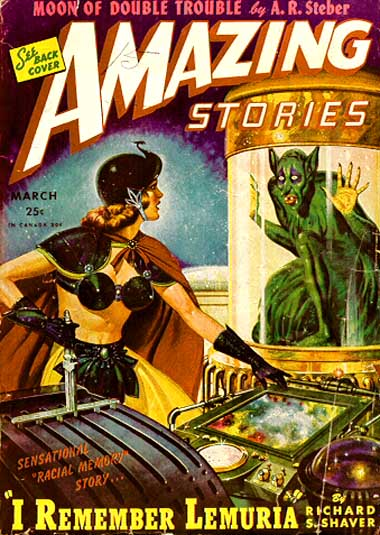
Shaver's first published work, the novella "I Remember Lemuria", was the cover story in the March 1945 Amazing Stories

Beginning in 1945, Palmer began to print ostensibly-true stories based on the writings of Richard Shaver, a Pennsylvania welder who claimed to be in telepathic communication with a secret underground race. In 1934, Shaver had been hospitalized for psychiatric problems; Barkun argues: "By most accounts Shaver himself believed with absolute conviction in the truthfulness of his stories. This, combined with their appearance in a pulp-fiction venue, served further to blur the already uncertain boundary between fact and fiction." Shaver claimed that ancient civilizations had mastered space travel, spread civilization to other planets, and could travel to Earth.

In a July 1946 editorial, Palmer argued that "responsible parties in world governments" were aware "of the fact of spaceships visiting Earth". Peebles opines: "One would be hard pressed to find a more concise summary of the flying saucer myth. Yet this was a year before the first widely publicized sighting." (Note: Amazing Stories July 1946. The same issue carried a letter from Fred Crisman in which he claimed to have battled underground monsters in Burma (Peebles p.13, Gulyas 2015 p.30))

==== Kenneth Arnold ====
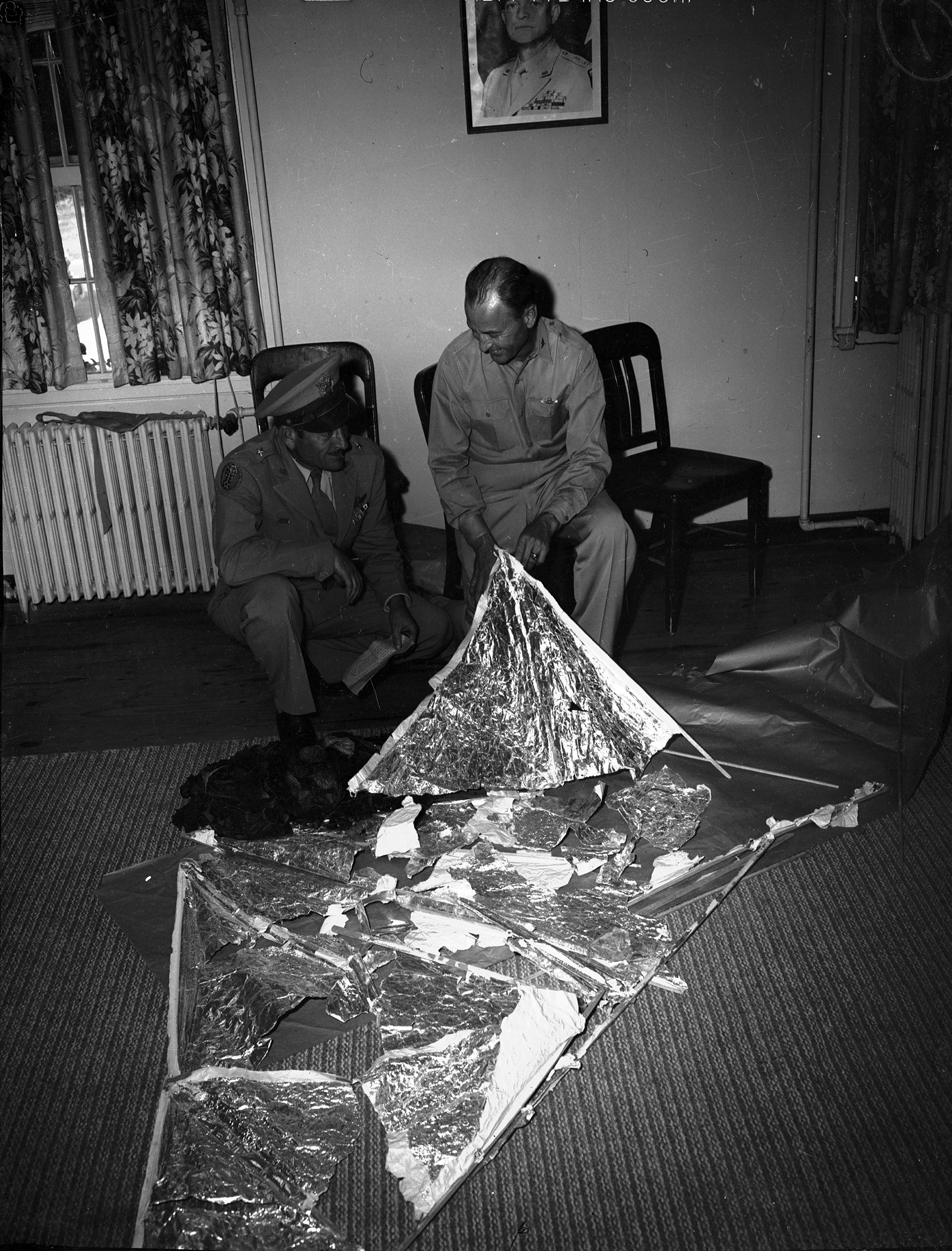
Army officials pose with balloon debris from Roswell.

The flying disc craze began on June 24, when media nationwide reported civilian pilot Kenneth Arnold's story of witnessing disc-shaped objects which headline writers dubbed "Flying Saucers". Such reports quickly spread throughout the United States; historians would later chronicle at least 800 "copycat" reports in subsequent weeks, while other sources estimate the reports may have numbered in the thousands.

On July 8, 1947, Roswell Army Air Field issued a press release stating that they had recovered a "flying disc". The Army quickly retracted the statement and clarified that the crashed object was a conventional weather balloon. The Roswell incident did not surface again until 1978, when ufologist Stanton Friedman interviewed Jesse Marcel.

In late July, Palmer contacted Kenneth Arnold and asked him to investigate a "flying disc" report from Fred Crisman near Maury Island, Washington. In June 1946 and again in May 1947, Palmer had published fantastical letters from Crisman, who claimed to have battled inhuman underground monsters in Burma. Arnold agreed and Palmer wired him $200 to fund the investigation." Arriving in Tacoma, Arnold interviewed Crisman, who told a tale of a flying disc that emitted rock-like debris and a visitation from mysterious black-clad stranger who gave ominous instructions not to speak of the disc.

Arnold summoned two Air Force investigators who took possession of the supposed debris, described as lava rocks, from Crisman. As the investigators returned to base, their B-25 caught fire and crashed. A local paper ran a story suggesting the plane had been sabotaged or shot down to prevent the shipping of the flying disc fragments. Though Crisman later confessed to a hoax, Peebles argues the story was the "first to give a sinister air" or "conspiratorial atmosphere" to the flying saucer myth.

==== Aftermath ====
In the October 1947 issue of Amazing Stories, editor Raymond Palmer argued the flying disc flap was proof of Richard Sharpe Shaver's claims. That same issue carried a letter from Shaver in which he argued the truth behind the discs would remain a secret. (Note: Amazing Stories October 1947)

Wrote Shaver:

"The discs can be a space invasion, a secret new army plane — or a scouting trip by an enemy country...OR, they can be Shaver's space ships, taking off and landing regularly on earth for centuries past, and seen today as they have always been — as a mystery. They could be leaving earth with cargos of wonder-mech that to us would mean emancipation from a great many of our worst troubles— and we'll never see those cargos...I predict that nothing more will be seen, and the truth of what the strange disc ships really are will never be disclosed to the common people. We just don't count to the people who do know about such things. It isn't necessary to tell us anything."

During the last decades of his life, Shaver devoted himself to "rock books"—stones that he believed had been created by the advanced ancient races and embedded with legible pictures and texts. After Shaver's death in 1975, his editor Raymond Palmer admitted that "Shaver had spent eight years not in the Cavern World, but in a mental institution" being treated for paranoid schizophrenia.

"There is a definite link between flying saucers, The Shaver Mystery, The Kennedy’s assassinations, Watergate and Fred Crisman."

— Ray Palmer, 1976 letter to Gray Barker

In 1952, Arnold and Palmer would author Coming of the Saucers. It detailed his 1947 investigation of Fred Crisman's claims, alleged he had been eavesdropped on during his investigation, and other strange behavior. In 1968, Crisman would be subpoenaed by a New Orleans grand jury in the prosecution of a local man for the assassination of President John F. Kennedy—a prosecution that would later be dramatized in the 1991 Oliver Stone film JFK.

=== 1950s ===
The 1950s saw an increase in both governmental and civilian investigative efforts and reports of public disinformation and suppression of evidence.

==== Donald Keyhoe ====
On December 26, 1949, True magazine published an article by Donald Keyhoe titled "The Flying Saucers Are Real". Keyhoe, a former Major in the US Marines, claimed that elements within the Air Force knew that saucers existed and had concluded they were likely 'inter-planetary'.

The article examined the Mantell UFO incident and quoted an unnamed pilot who opined that the Air Force's explanation "looks like a cover up to me". The article claimed a "rocket authority at Wright field" had concluded saucers were interplanetary. Concern over a public panic, of the kind that supposedly occurred after the 1938 War of the Worlds broadcast, is cited in the article as a possible motive for the cover up.

The True article caused a sensation. When Keyhoe expanded the article into a book, The Flying Saucers Are Real (1950), it sold over half a million copies in paperback. The Air Force denied "flying saucers" exist and further denied that they were US technology being covered-up.

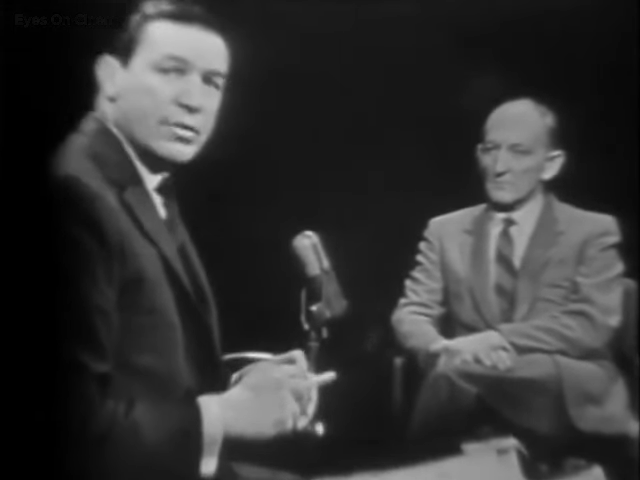
UFO conspiracy proponent Donald Keyhoe (right) interviewed by Mike Wallace on March 8, 1958

In 1954, before Sputnik became the first man-made satellite, Keyhoe told press that alien satellites had been detected in Earth orbit. In 1955, Donald Keyhoe authored a new book that pointedly accused elements of the United States government of engaging in a conspiracy to cover up knowledge of flying saucers. Keyhoe claims the existence of a "silence group" orchestrating this conspiracy. Historian of Folklore Curtis Peebles argues: "The Flying Saucer Conspiracy marked a shift in Keyhoe's belief system. No longer were flying saucers the central theme; that now belonged to the silence group and its coverup. For the next two decades Keyhoe's beliefs about this would dominate the flying saucer myth."

On January 22, 1958, Donald Keyhoe appeared on CBS's Armstrong Circle Theatre in an episode titled "UFO: Enigma of the Skies". During the live broadcast, Keyhoe deviated from the pre-approved script, announcing "now I’m going to reveal something that has never been disclosed before". At this point in the broadcast, Keyhoe's microphone was cut. According to Peebles, "Millions of people thought the Air Force had (literally) "silenced" Keyhoe. Keyhoe emerged as the winner of the Armstrong Theater battle. Believers would point to it as an example of 'silencing.' To the public at large, CBS's cutting off of the audio gave Keyhoe's appearance an impact much greater than anything he said."

==== Aztec hoax ====
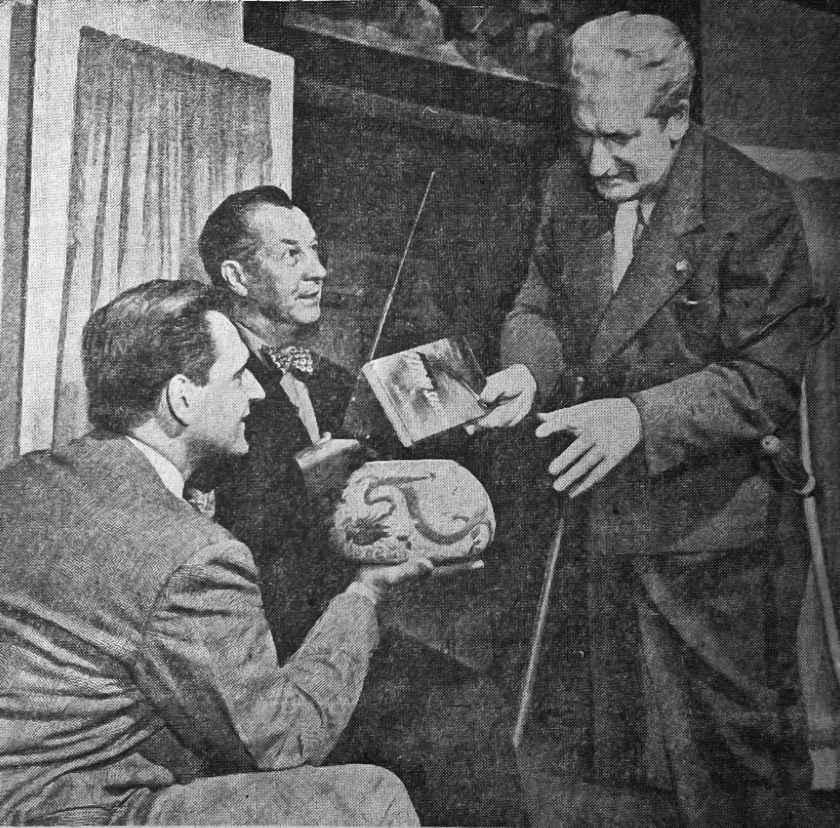
Author Frank Scully (right) and confidence man Silas Newton (center)

The first "alien bodies" conspiracy theory emerged in October and November 1949, when journalist Frank Scully published two columns in Variety. Scully claimed that dead extraterrestrial beings were recovered from a flying saucer crash, based on what he said was reported to him by a scientist involved. His 1950 book Behind the Flying Saucers expanded on the theme, adding that there had been two such incidents in Arizona and one in New Mexico, a 1948 incident that involved a saucer that was nearly 100 feet (30 m) in diameter. (Note: 99.99 feet (30.47695 m) to be exact.) In January 1950, Time Magazine skeptically repeated stories of crashed saucers with humanoid occupants.

It was later revealed that Scully had been the victim of "two veteran confidence artists". In 1952 and 1956, True magazine published articles by San Francisco Chronicle reporter John Philip Cahn that exposed Newton and "Dr. Gee" (identified as Leo A. GeBauer) as oil con artists who had hoaxed Scully.

In a 1997 Roswell report, Air Force investigator James McAndrew wrote that "even with the exposure of this obvious fraud, the Aztec story is still revered by UFO theorists. Elements of this story occasionally reemerge and are thought to be the catalyst for other crashed flying saucer stories, including the Roswell Incident."

==== U.S. Air Force ====
General Samford press conference on flying saucers

On July 29, 1952, General John Samford, the director of Air Force intelligence, held a press conference on the recent UFO sightings over the nation's capital. The conference was the largest one held in the seven years since World War II. Samford attributed the recent radar returns to temperature inversion. While most reports were easily explainable, Samford acknowledged having received a number of reports from "credible observers of relatively incredible things." Samford continued, saying: "our real interest in this project is not one of intellectual curiosity but is in trying to establish and appraise the possibility of a menace to the United States. And we can say, as of now, that there has been no pattern that reveals anything remotely like purpose or remotely like consistency that we can in any way associate with any menace to the United States."

While most accepted the official explanation, Peebles argues "many in the press and public got the impression that the Air Force was covering up, and this was reflected in some of the press coverage." In 1952, the Robertson Panel recommended a campaign of public education.

Al Chop, a civilian, had served as the Press Chief for Air Materiel Command in Dayton, Ohio until 1951 when he transferred to the Pentagon to serve as the press spokesman for Project Bluebook. In 1956, a film titled Unidentified Flying Objects: The True Story of Flying Saucers dramatized the events of the early 1950s from the point of view of "Al Chop", an Air Force press officer played by reporter Tom Towers. The film incorporates interviews with actual eyewitnesses and historic footage of unidentified objects, concluding with a dramatization of the 1952 UFO flap that featured repeated sightings over Washington D.C.

Ruppelt was a captain in the US Air Force who served as director of official investigations into UFOs: Project Grudge and Project Bluebook. In 1956, Ruppelt authored The Report on Unidentified Flying Objects, a book that has been called the "most significant" of its era. The book discussed the Twining memo which initiated UFO investigation and the rejected 1948 "Estimate of the Situation". Ruppelt criticized the Air Force's handling of UFOs investigations. Historian Curtis Peebles concludes that the book "should have ended the speculation about an Air Force cover-up. In fact, Ruppelt's statements were converted into support for the cover-up idea."

==== Philadelphia Experiment ====
In 1955, Morris K. Jessup achieved some notoriety with his book The Case for the UFO, in which he argued that UFOs represented a mysterious subject worthy of further study.

In January 1956, Jessup began receiving a series of letters from "Carlos Miguel Allende", later identified as Carl Meredith Allen. "Allende" warned Jessup not to investigate the levitation of UFOs and spun a tale of a dangerous experiment in which a navy ship was made invisible, only to inexplicably teleport from Philadelphia to Norfolk, Virginia, before reappearing back in Philadelphia. The ship's crew was supposed to have suffered various side effects, including insanity, intangibility, and being "frozen" in place.

In 1957, Jessup was invited to the Office of Naval Research where he was shown an annotated copy of his book that was filled with handwritten notes in its margins, written with three different shades of blue ink, appearing to detail a debate among three individuals. They discussed ideas about the propulsion for flying saucers, alien races, and express concern that Jessup was too close to discovering their technology. Jessup noticed the handwriting of the annotations resembled the letters he received from Allen. Twelve years later, Allen would say that he authored all of the annotations in order "to scare the hell out of Jessup."

Jessup died by suicide in 1959. In 1963, Gray Barker authored a book alleging Jessup's death was suspicious. (Note: The Strange Case of Dr. M.K. Jessup (1963) and The Enigma of M.K. Jessup (1971)) By 1975, the Philadelphia Experiment was being promoted by paranormal author Charles Berlitz and in 1984, the legend was adapted into a fictional film. In 1980, Berlitz co-authored The Roswell Incident.

==== Men in Black ====
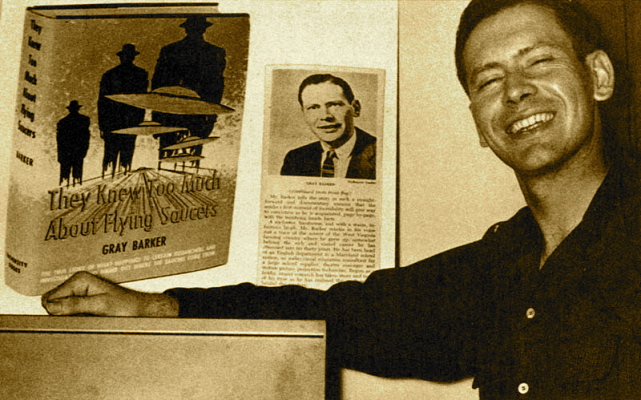
Gray Barker poses with his book cover art

1956 saw the publication of Gray Barker's They Knew Too Much About Flying Saucers, the book which publicized the idea of Men in Black who appear to UFO witnesses and warn them to keep quiet. There has been continued speculation that the men in black are government agents who harass and threaten UFO witnesses.

According to the Skeptical Inquirer article "Gray Barker: My Friend, the Myth-Maker", there may have been "a grain of truth" to Barker's writings on the Men in Black, in that government agencies did attempt to discourage public interest in UFOs during the 1950s. However, Barker is thought to have greatly embellished the facts of the situation. In the same Skeptical Inquirer article, Sherwood revealed that, in the late 1960s, he and Barker collaborated on a brief fictional notice alluding to the Men in Black, which was published as fact first in Raymond A. Palmer's Flying Saucers magazine and some of Barker's own publications. In the story, Sherwood (writing as "Dr. Richard H. Pratt") claimed he was ordered to silence by the "blackmen" after learning that UFOs were time-travelling vehicles. Barker later wrote to Sherwood, "Evidently the fans swallowed this one with a gulp."

=== 1960–70s ===
The 1960s began an era of government skepticism. After the assassination of John F. Kennedy, the Pentagon Papers, and the Watergate scandal, trust in the US government declined and acceptance of conspiracy theories became widespread.

In 1966, amid a wave (or 'flap') of UFO reports throughout southern Michigan, there were two mass sightings reported. The first occurred around marshland near Dexter, while the second mass-sighting took place near the campus arboretum of Hillsdale College, about 50 miles away.

After the reports were attributed to swamp gas by Air Force civilian investigator J. Allen Hynek, the explanation was widely derided. The Richmond News Leader accused the Air Force of attempting "to discredit the testimony of witnesses." and US congressman Gerald Ford called for a formal Congressional investigation into the sightings. Like "weather balloon" before it, the term "swamp gas" came to mean any unbelievable debunking.

==== Fred Crisman ====
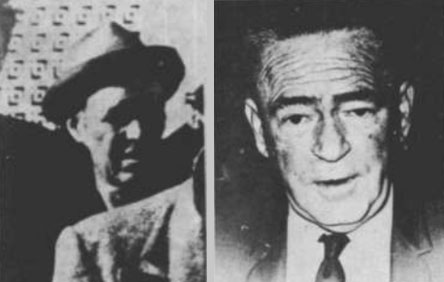
"Tramp C" (left) compared to Fred Crisman in an exhibit from House Select Committee on Assassinations

On March 1, 1967, New Orleans District attorney Jim Garrison arrested and charged New Orleans businessman Clay Shaw with having conspired to assassinate President Kennedy. Fred Crisman was subpoenaed by Garrison and testified before the New Orleans grand jury in the case. Garrison issued a press release accusing Crisman of being an undercover agent with knowledge of the Kennedy Assassination.

The jury took less than an hour to find Shaw not guilty. Garrison's prosecution of Shaw was highly criticized as "a fatally flawed case built on flimsy evidence that featured a chorus of dubious and even wacky witnesses" while others more pointedly accuse Garrison of "recklessness, cruelty, abuse of power, publicity mongering and dishonesty".

Despite the near-universal condemnation of the prosecution, conspiracy theories continued to link Crisman to the Kennedy assassination and a supposed UFO cover-up. Crisman had been involved in the Shaver Mystery and the Maury Island Hoax in the 1940s. In the late 1970s, the United States House Select Committee on Assassinations considered the possibility that Crisman may have been one of the "three tramps" detained and photographed in the aftermath of the JFK assassination. Pointing to Crisman's supposed involvement, later conspiracy authors like Kenn Thomas, Jim Marrs, and Bill Cooper alleged that Kennedy's assassination was tied to a UFO conspiracy.

==== Popular culture ====
In the novel and film 2001: A Space Odyssey by Arthur C. Clarke and Stanley Kubrick, American discovery of an extraterrestrial artifact prompts a cover up and disinformation campaign with fatal consequence for astronauts sent to investigate. The film was prominent in Moon landing conspiracy theories, which variously argue that humans never went to the Moon, went there with the assistance of aliens, or even that NASA covered up lunar evidence of aliens. One scholar opined that the 1968 film "seems to anticipate the post-Nixonian culture of governmental conspiracy".

J. Allen Hynek was an American astronomer who served as scientific advisor to UFO studies undertaken by the U.S. Air Force. Hynek had drawn ridicule for his most famous debunking, in which he suggested a mass-sighting over Michigan may have been caused by "swamp gas". By 1974, the former skeptic was publicly charging that Bluebook was "a Cosmic Watergate". Hynek claimed 20% of Bluebook cases were unexplained. Fellow Ufologists like Stanton Friedman echoed Hynek's "Cosmic Watergate" accusations. In 1976, pulp publisher Ray Palmer argued "there is a definite link between flying saucers, The Shaver Mystery, The Kennedy’s assassinations, Watergate and Fred Crisman."

During the 1976 US presidential campaign, Jimmy Carter pledged that if elected, he would "make every piece of information this country has about UFOs available to the public and scientists".

==== Alien bodies claims ====
In the mid-1970s, legends of alien bodies re-emerged in the popular lore. The idea of alien corpses from a crashed ship being stored in an Air Force morgue at the Wright-Patterson Air Force Base was mentioned in Scully's Behind the Flying Saucers, expanded in the 1966 book Incident at Exeter, and became the basis for a 1968 science-fiction novel The Fortec Conspiracy. Fortec was about a fictional cover-up by the Air Force unit charged with reverse-engineering other nations' technical advancements.

In 1974, science-fiction author and conspiracy theorist Robert Spencer Carr alleged that alien bodies recovered from the Aztec crash were stored in "Hangar 18" at Wright-Patterson. Carr claimed that his sources had witnessed the alien autopsy, another idea later incorporated into the Roswell narrative. The Air Force explained that no "Hangar 18" existed at the base, noting a similarity between Carr's story and the fictional Fortec Conspiracy. In the mid-1970s, author Leonard H. Stringfield promoted tales of UFO crash retrievals. In 1977, recurring SNL characters The Coneheads were contacted by an Air Force investigator (Buck Henry) after an extraterrestrial artifact crashes in the Southwestern US. The 1980 film Hangar 18, which dramatized Carr's claims, was described as "a modern-day dramatization" of Roswell by the film's director James L. Conway, and as "nascent Roswell mythology" by folklorist Thomas Bullard.

Decades later, Carr's son recalled that he had often "mortified my mother and me by spinning preposterous stories in front of strangers... [tales of] befriending a giant alligator in the Florida swamps, and sharing complex philosophical ideas with porpoises in the Gulf of Mexico."

==== Alien Abduction claims ====
In 1975, millions of Americans watched when NBC aired film The UFO Incident, a dramatization of the Betty and Barney Hill case, the first reported "alien abduction". In 1961, the Hills reportedly witnessed an unidentified light in the night sky as they were driving from Montreal to Portsmouth. Under hypnosis, Barney told a story of being abducted and drew a picture of an alien with large, wrap-around eyes—the first report of a "gray" alien. Recovered-memory therapy is not based on scientific evidence, and recovered memories are indistinguishable from false memories. Psychologists and skeptics argued that "after viewing this movie, any person with a little imagination could now become an instant celebrity" by claiming an abduction, concluding that "one of those instant celebrities was Travis Walton."

Two weeks after the film aired, an Arizona crew working on a Forestry contract reported that member Travis Walton had been abducted by a flying saucer. Science writers Philip J. Klass and Michael Shermer highlight a potential motive for the hoax was to provide an "Act of God" that would allow the crew to avoid a steep financial penalty from the Forestry Service for failing to complete their contract by the deadline. The Walton case is widely regarded as a hoax, even by believers of UFOs and alien abductions.

By 1976, artist and amateur UFO researcher Budd Hopkins began focusing on abduction reports; Hopkins popularized the reports in his 1981 book Missing Time and its 1987 follow-up Intruders. Also in 1987, established horror author Whitley Strieber released Communion, an ostensibly non-fiction autobiographical abduction tale; It topped the New York Times bestseller list. Strieber's book popularized the idea of alien 'visitors' associated with anal probes. In 1989, the book was adapted into a film of the same name, starring Christopher Walken.

==== Close Encounters of the Third Kind ====
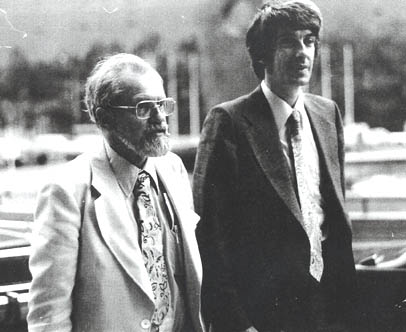
J. Allen Hynek (left) and Jacques Vallée were both involved in Close Encounters of the Third Kind

In 1974, the film UFOs: Past, Present, and Future dramatized an ostensibly-historical meeting between humans and aliens who land after being summoned. The filmmakers reported being told by military officials that a UFO had landed at Holloman Air Force Base. The depiction of a landing in the blockbuster Close Encounters of the Third Kind has been called a "thinly veiled reference to the Holloman landing" story. The Holloman story would be later promoted by hoaxer Richard Doty.

On December 14, 1977, the Spielberg blockbuster film Close Encounters of the Third Kind premiered and brought UFO conspiracy theories to a global market. The film opens with a United Nations recovery of Flight 19, lost in the Bermuda Triangle some 32 years prior, in Mexico's Sonora desert; Since Keyhoe's 1955 book The Flying Saucer Conspiracy, theorists had linked Flight 19's disappearance to flying saucers. The film's subplot of an "exchange program" of humans visiting aliens would later resurface in conspiracy theory as Project Serpo.

Legendary French filmmaker François Truffaut played a character inspired by French UFO investigator Jacques Vallée, an advisor to the film.Real life debunker-turned-believer J. Allen Hynek made a cameo in the film. In coming years, conspiracy figure John Lear and others would allege that powerful insiders had "subtly promoted" Close Encounters and other films to 'educate' the public.

==== Roswell ====
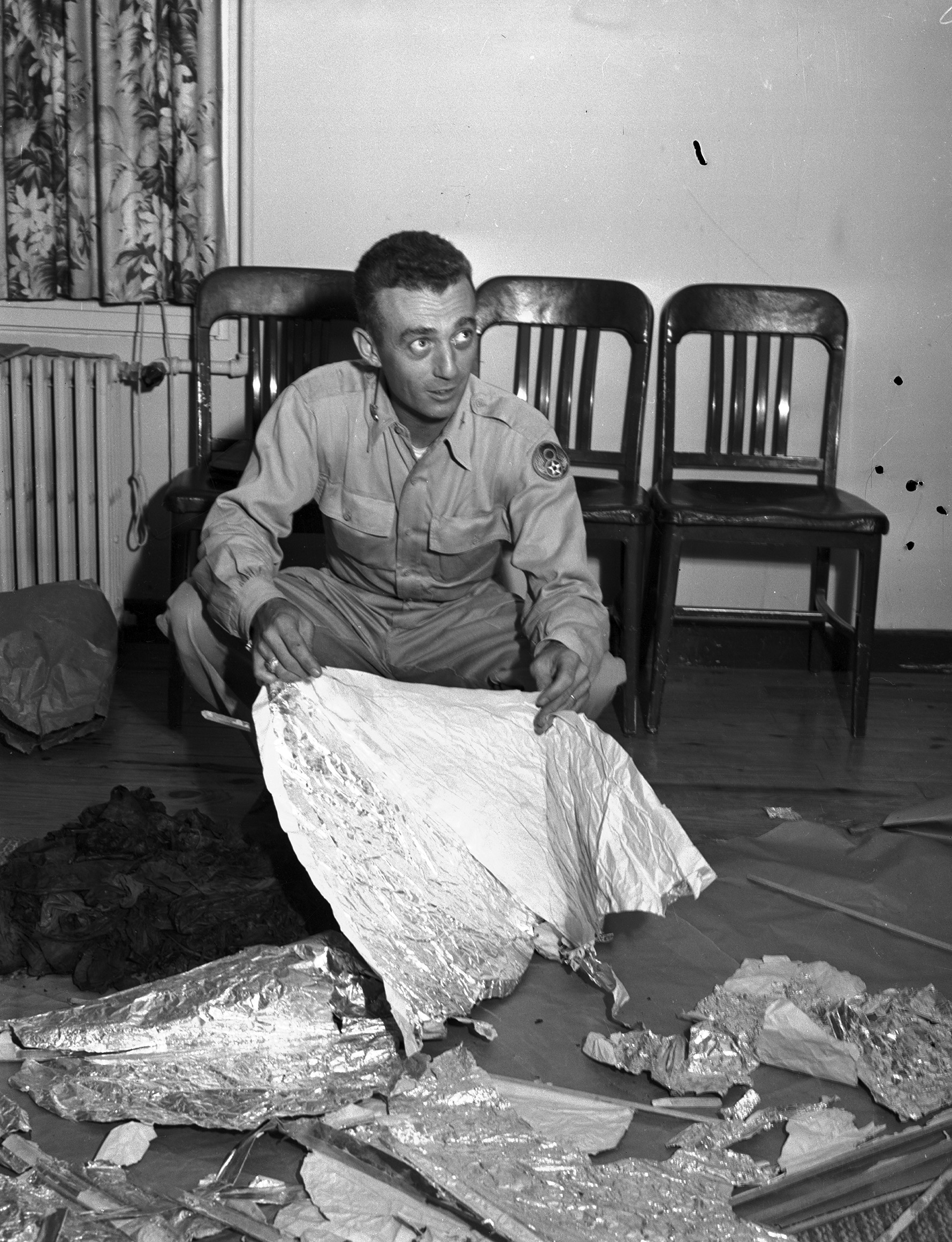
Jesse Marcel holding foil debris from the Roswell incident in 1947

In February 1978, UFO researcher Stanton Friedman interviewed Jesse Marcel, the only person known to have accompanied the Roswell debris from where it was recovered to Fort Worth where reporters saw material that was claimed to be part of the recovered object. Marcel's statements contradicted those he made to the press in 1947. Marcel revealed that the 1947 "weather balloon" had been a cover story, saying: "They wanted some comments from me, but I wasn't at liberty to do that. So, all I could do is keep my mouth shut. And General Ramey is the one who discussed – told the newspapers, I mean the newsman, what it was, and to forget about it. It is nothing more than a weather observation balloon. Of course, we both knew differently."

Uncertain of the material's origin, Marcel would speculate the debris might have been extraterrestrial. In all his statements, Marcel consistently denied the presence of bodies. On February 28, 1980, sensationalist tabloid the National Enquirer brought large-scale attention to the Roswell story.

In the 1990s, the US military published two reports disclosing the true nature of the crashed aircraft: a surveillance balloon from Project Mogul. Nevertheless, the Roswell incident continues to be of interest to the media, and conspiracy theories surrounding the event persist. Roswell has been described as "the world's most famous, most exhaustively investigated and most thoroughly debunked UFO claim".

=== 1980s ===
In the 1980s, UFO conspiracy theories began to incorporate politics, alleging that the US Government was in league with an evil alien race. By way of contrast with prior UFO conspiracy theories about benevolent 'space brothers', author Jerome Clark named this new strain of thinking "ufology's dark side".

Richard Doty, who identified as a special agent with the Air Force Office of Special Investigations at Kirtland AFB, was a source for much of this new 'dark' mythology. Another important figure during this era was John Lear, son of Learjet founder William Powell Lear. Pilkington argues that in the second half of the 1980s, Lear was "probably the most influential source" of UFO conspiracy information.

==== Cattle mutilation claims ====
Project Gasbuggy detonation site, only 12 miles away from Dulce

During the 1970s, the Colorado-New Mexico border region was a hotspot for cattle mutilation reports, especially the small town of Dulce, New Mexico on the Jicarilla Apache Indian Reservation. Ranchers reported sightings of unusual lights, UFOs, and "quiet helicopters" associated with the mutilations. Law enforcement recovered radar chaff, syringes, and a gas mask; Some of the corpses had rope marks and broken bones, as if they had been hoisted onto a helicopter and dropped onto he ground. After ranchers took to firing on unidentified helicopters, the US Bureau of Land Management was forced to ground all helicopters in Eastern Colorado. Writing in 2010, Pilkington reflects: "The silent helicopter has now been revealed as not only a reality, but one that was flying as long ago as 1972. This was the Hughes 500P, the P standing for Penetrator, an aircraft known by the few who flew it as ‘The Quiet One’."

By 1976, some UFO conspiracy theorists argued that supposed cattle mutilations were caused by extra-terrestrial UFOs. In 1979, the idea of aliens causing "mutilations" was ridiculed when it was reported that a mutilated bull had been drugged with Thorazine; Law enforcement told press: "We know this stuff is made here, and it isn't from outer space. Whoever is doing it is highly sophisticated, and they have a lot of resources. They're well organized".

Pilkington suggests the 'mutilations' may have been a covert epidemiological monitoring program, perhaps of radiation. In 1967, the United States Atomic Energy Commission had detonated an underground nuclear device near Dulce as part of Project Gasbuggy.

==== Paul Bennewitz ====
The late 1970s also saw the beginning of controversy centered on Paul Bennewitz. On April 20, 1979, U.S. Attorney R. E. Thompson and US Senator Harrison Schmidt held a public meeting about cattle mutilations. The meeting was attended by about 80, one attendee was Paul Bennewitz, an amateur UFO investigator. Bennewitz was befriended by Richard Doty, an Air Force Sergeant, who fed him false stories of a UFO conspiracy, government treaties with extraterrestrials, and alien harvesting of cattle. This material inspired much of the post-1980 UFO mythology. The earliest known reference to "MJ Twelve" comes from a 1981 document used in disinformation targeting Paul Bennewitz.

Paul Bennewitz was ultimately hospitalized for paranoia. Doty would appear in the 2013 documentary Mirage Men to discuss his role in deceiving Bennewitz. While Doty claims Bennewitz was targeted for inadvertently recording classified technology at Kirtland Air Force Base, Pilkington argues that government agents likely targeted Bennewitz due to his participation in the 1979 meeting on cattle mutilations around Dulce.

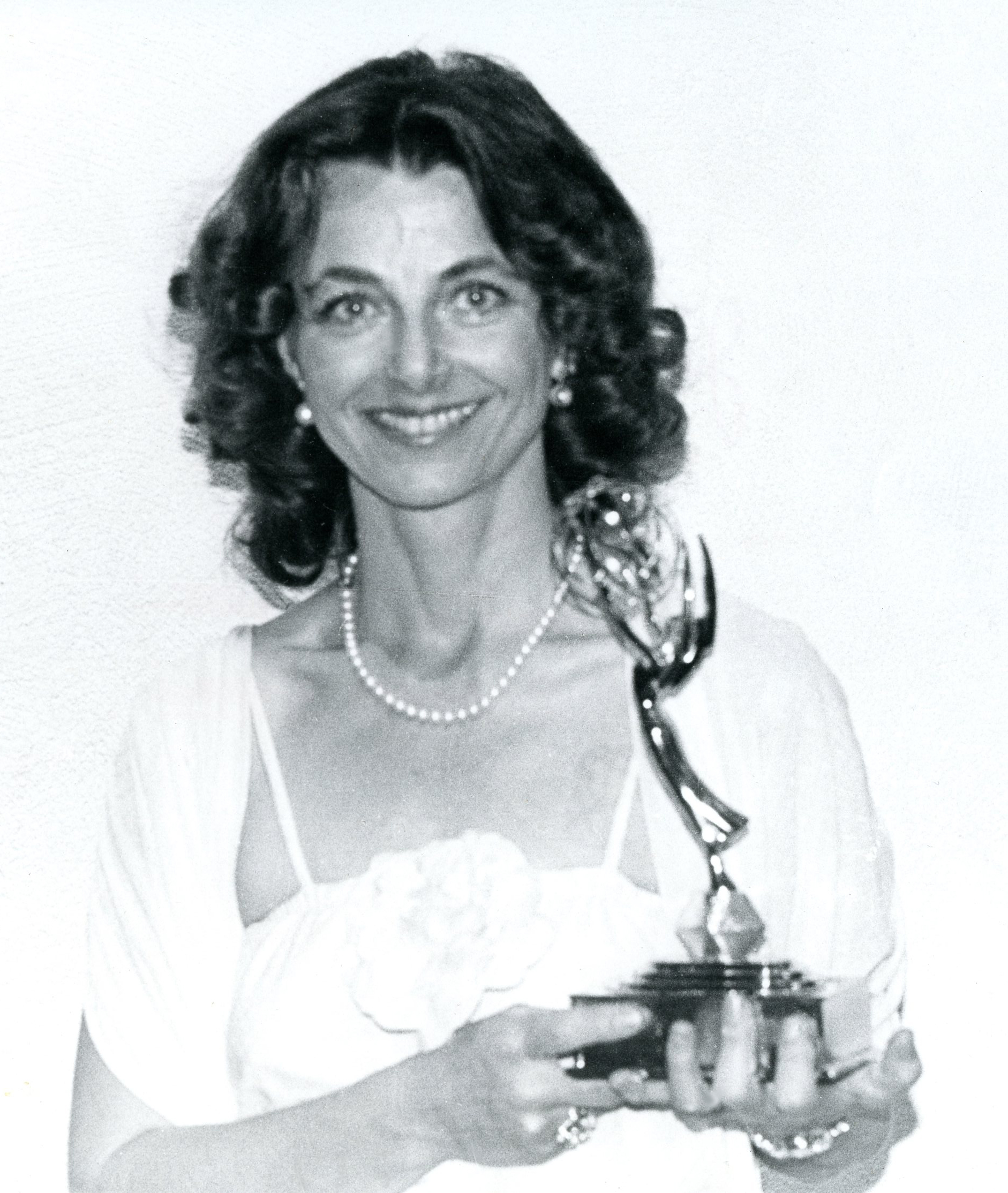
Linda Moulton Howe in 1981

In 1979, Linda Moulton Howe was a documentarian exploring cattle mutilations. In 1980, Moulton Howe's documentary "A Strange Harvest" alleged that cattle mutilations were connected to UFOs. In April 1983, Moulton Howe travelled to visit Richard Doty and Kirtland Air Force Base.

At Kirtland, Doty showed Moulton Howe fabricated documents purporting to be presidential briefing papers. The documents told of UFOs crashes at Roswell, surviving aliens, MJ-12, and a UFO cover-up. For decades, Doty denied Moulton Howe's retelling of these events, but in the late 2000s, he would acknowledge the exchange took place, admitting "We gave Linda [...] some bad information." Howe became a "staunch advocate" for these 'dark' conspiracy theories that the U.S. government is working with aliens. She would later be called one of "the gurus of American ufology".

==== MJ-12 ====
External videos
- Bill Moore addresses MUFON, July 1 1989

After the publication of The Roswell Incident, Richard C. Doty and other individuals presenting themselves as Air Force Intelligence Officers approached Moore. They used the unfulfilled promise of hard evidence of extraterrestrial retrievals to recruit Moore, who kept notes on other ufologists and intentionally spread misinformation within the UFO community.

On December 11, 1984, filmmaker Jaime Shandera received an anonymous parcel containing an undeveloped roll of film; When developed, the film was found to contain a copy of what is now known as the "Majestic 12 documents". Shandera received the package just after a phone call from Moore. The documents detailed the creation of a group, "Majestic 12", was formed to handle Roswell debris.

On October 14, 1988, actor Mike Farrell hosted UFO Cover Up? Live, a two-hour television special "focusing on the government's handling of information regarding UFOs" and "whether there has been any suppression of evidence supporting the existence of UFOs". The program interviewed shadow-clad informants Falcon (Richard Doty) and Condor about the Majestic 12 documents. The program was noted for its claim of an alien being, held at Area 51, who liked to eat strawberry ice cream.

The Majestic-12 materials have been heavily scrutinized and discredited. Carl Sagan criticized the complete lack of provenance of documents "miraculously dropped on a doorstep like something out of a fairy story, perhaps 'The Elves and the Shoemaker'." Researchers noted the idiosyncratic date format not found in government documents from the time they were purported to originate, but widely used in Moore's personal notes. Some signatures appear to be photocopied from other documents. For example, a signature from President Harry Truman is identical to one from an October 1, 1947 letter to Vannevar Bush. After researchers noted many style and formatting errors, Moore admitted that he had typed and stamped the document as a facsimile.

At a 1989 Mutual UFO Network conference, Moore confessed that he had intentionally fed fake evidence of extraterrestrials to UFO researchers, including Bennewitz. Roswell conspiracy proponents turned on Moore, but not the broader conspiracy theory. Doty would later admit he had spread fabricated documents to UFO researchers in the 1980s.

==== Milton William Cooper ====
In the Summer of 1988, Bill Cooper made his first public comments on the ParaNet Bulletin Board System, an early UFO message board, claiming that in 1966 he was serving aboard the USS Tiru when he and fellow Navy personnel witnessed a metal craft "larger than a football field" repeatedly enter and exit the water. Cooper claimed he was instructed by superiors to never speak about the incident.

Biographer Mark Jacobson argues "the Tiru incident itself would not have done much to make Cooper's name in ufology. That opportunity came only a few days later" when he was contacted by fellow ParaNet poster John Lear. Lear, the son of Learjet founder Bill Lear, identified as a pilot who had flown missions for the CIA. On August 25, 1988, Lear authored a post titled "The UFO Coverup" which incorporated elements of mythos from Paul Bennewitz, a ufologist who was later revealed to have been fed disinformation by American counter-intelligence agent Richard C. Doty. Cooper soon visited Lear, and the two spent much time together from 1988 to 1990.

Cooper's views were heavily influenced by Lear and his story of alien collusion with secret governmental forces. In 1989, the two released an "indictment" against the US Government for "aiding and abetting and concealing this Alien Nation which exists in our borders". In 2018, columnist Colin Dickey noted Lear and Cooper's influence, writing "in the early years [UFO writers] did not, by and large, embrace strong political positions. They were the tip of a spear asserting that the number one thing we had to fear was not little green men, but the government that colluded with them, appropriating their technology against us."

Cooper and Lear's collaboration lasted until the 1989 MUFON conference where Bill Moore admitted to spreading lies to UFO researchers. In response, Cooper accused Lear of being a CIA plant.

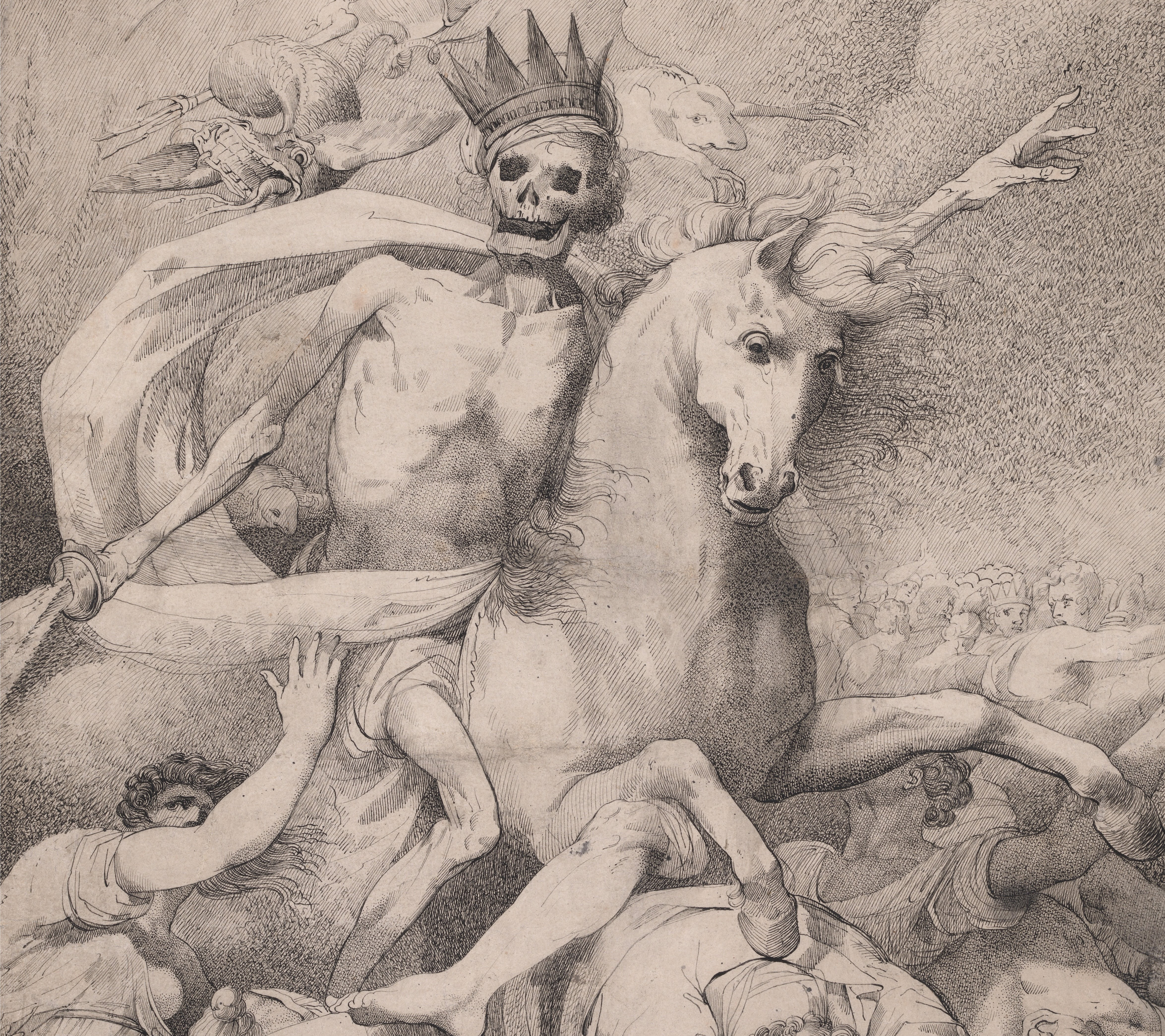
"Death on a Pale Horse", an apocalyptic image from the Book of Revelation, as depicted by 18th-century artist John Hamilton Mortimer

In 1991, Cooper published the influential conspiracy work Behold a Pale Horse which claimed that Kennedy was killed after he "informed Majestic 12 that he intended to reveal the presence of aliens to the American people". Behold a Pale Horse became 'wildly popular' with conspiracy theorists and went on to be one of the most-read books in the US prison system.

Cooper described the "Illuminati" as a secret international organization, controlled by the Bilderberg Group, that conspired with the Knights of Columbus, Masons, Skull and Bones, and other organizations. Its ultimate goal, he said, was the establishment of a New World Order. According to Cooper, the Illuminati conspirators not only invented alien threats for their own gain, but actively conspired with extraterrestrials to take over the world. Cooper produced regular shortwave-radio broadcasts that were popular with conspiracy theorist and anti-government activists. Cooper reportedly met with Timothy McVeigh shortly before the Oklahoma City bombing. In November 2001, Cooper was shot and killed by law enforcement during an attempted arrest.

==== Bob Lazar ====
Lear introduced journalist George Knapp to UFO whistle-blower Bob Lazar and his tales of Area 51. In November 1989, Bob Lazar appeared in a special interview with Knapp on Las Vegas TV station KLAS to discuss his alleged employment at S-4.

Lazar's claims were widely discredited. Lazar never obtained the degrees he claims to hold from MIT and Caltech. In 1990, Lazar was arrested for aiding and abetting a prostitution ring. This was reduced to felony pandering, to which he pleaded guilty. By 1991, Nevada press reported tourists traveling to the Groom Lake region in hopes of glimpsing UFOs.

In 1995, lecturer Philip Schneider gave a series of public talks promoting Dulce Base conspiracy theories. After his death in 1996, Schneider was revealed to have suffered from paranoid schizophrenia. Author Greg Valdez argues Schneider was directly influenced by Lear.

Lear remained a prominent voice in the UFO conspiracy theory community until his death in 2022, making multiple appearances on TV and online shows, including Coast to Coast AM. Lazar continues to spread tales of Area 51 through media appearance. In 2018, he was featured in producer George Knapp and Jeremy Corbell's documentary Bob Lazar: Area 51 & Flying Saucers and Joe Rogan's podcast.

==== Project Serpo ====
In 2005, UFO researcher Victor Martinez received an anonymous email about Project Serpo, a supposed "exchange program" where Americans were sent to live on an alien homeworld. The anonymous informant and three other supposed-corroborating witnesses were revealed to be accounts operated by Rick Doty. He participated in the 2013 documentary Mirage Men about his campaign against Bennewitz, Howe, and others.

Doty continues to spread UFO stories, appearing in conferences, films, and the 2021 TV series UFO.

=== 1990s ===
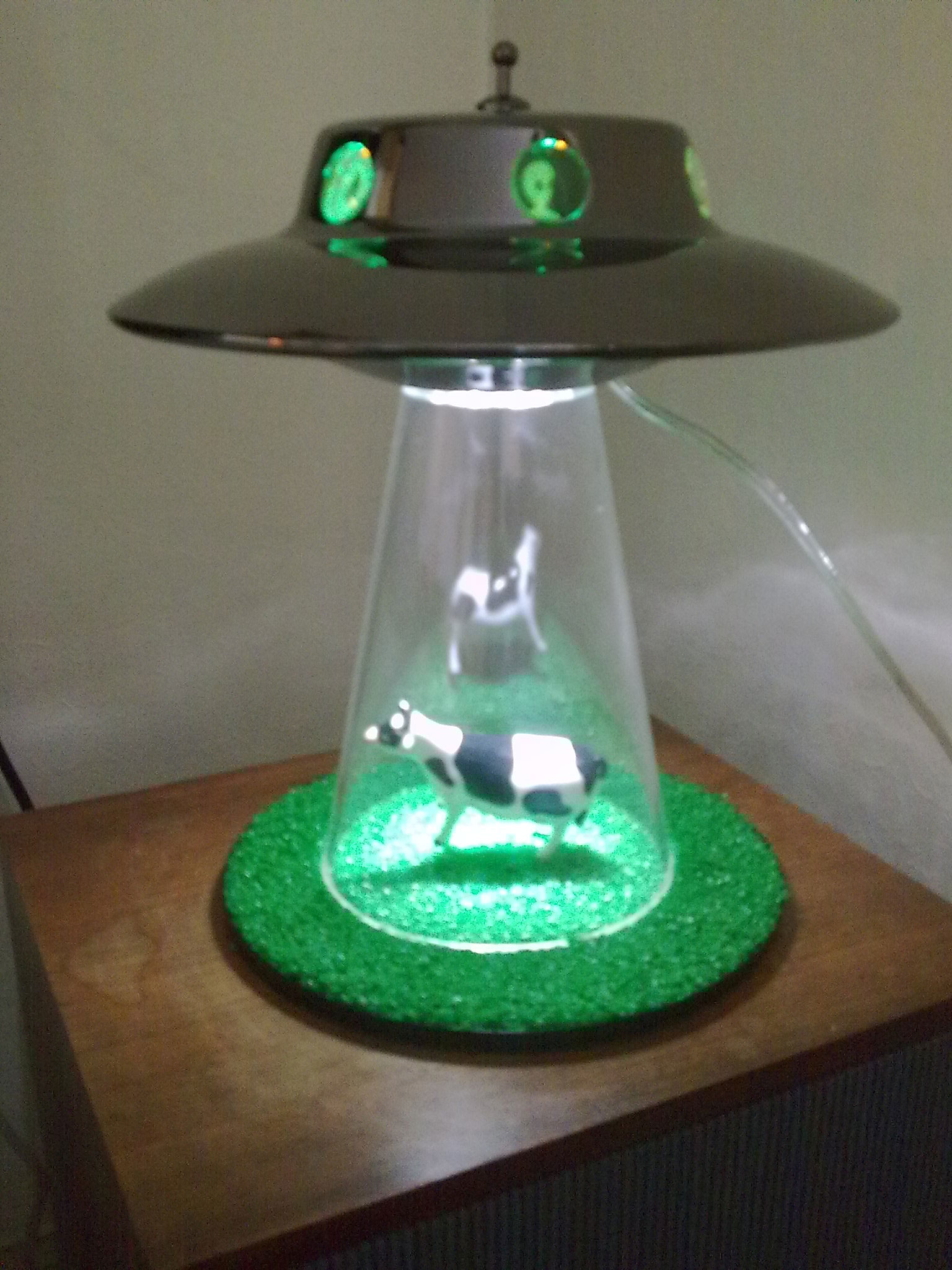
A novelty lamp depicting gray aliens in a flying saucer abducting a cow

The 1990s saw as proliferation of conspiracy media along with the rise of internet culture. Images of a gray alien were called the "smiley face" of the 1990s. The 1991 film JFK popularized Kennedy assassination conspiracy theories, specifically the writings of Jim Marrs. By 1997, Marrs was arguing that Kennedy's murder was connected to a UFO conspiracy. In the 1992 comedy Sneakers, Dan Aykroyd plays a conspiracy theorist convinced that Eisenhower made a treaty with space aliens to permit cattle mutilations.

In September 1993, The X-Files premiered focused on UFO conspiracy theories. Barkun observes that the show's oft-repeated mantra "Trust No One" serves to "neatly encapsulate the conspiracist's limitless suspicions", while Gulyas describes the series as "an exemplar of paranoid television, embracing the mounting paranoia and tensions of the 1990s".

The X-Files incorporated elements of UFO conspiracy theories, including a shadowy cabal of conspirators, a Roswell cover-up, Men in Black, and a 'treaty' allowing alien abduction. In the episode “Musings of a Cigarette Smoking Man”, the series antagonist is revealed to have been responsible for assassinations of John F. Kennedy and Martin Luther King. The 1998 X-Files film explicitly homaged Bill Cooper, with on-screen characters talking about "Silent Weapons for Quiet Wars"—an influential chapter title from Cooper's book.

The success of The X-Files inspired similar works. The 1994 made-for-TV movie Roswell, broadcast on the Showtime Network, dramatized tales of a UFO crash and cover-up. The 1996 blockbuster Independence Day introduced a global audience to the idea of a recovered Roswell craft being secretly studied at Area 51. Episodes of the 1996 show Dark Skies featured the tagline "History as we know it is a lie". The show provided an alternative history that "wove nearly every significant historical event of the past fifty years into a paranoid vision of extraterrestrial infiltration."

The following year, Men in Black re-cast the supposed secret agents as comic heroes rather than sinister villains. While prior conspiracy films had taken the perspective of conspiracy theorists, Men in Black took the perspective of the conspirators. The film was the first time 'Men in Black" appeared in a major movie, cementing the men in black in popular culture. The film 'poked fun' at government debunking, with one of the Men in Black telling a witness "The flash of light you saw was not a UFO, swamp gas from a weather balloon was trapped in a thermal pocket and reflected the light from Venus", a combination of 'official explanations' the Air Force has offered for UFO reports.

==== Alien Autopsy hoax ====
Alien Autopsy: Fact or Fiction is a 1995 pseudo-documentary containing grainy black and white footage of a hoaxed alien autopsy. In 1995, film purporting to show an alien autopsy conducted shortly after the Roswell incident was released by British entrepreneur Ray Santilli. The footage aired on television networks around the world. The program was an overnight sensation, with Time magazine declaring that the film had sparked a debate "with an intensity not lavished on any home movie since the Zapruder film".

The program was thoroughly debunked. The autopsy footage was filmed on an inexpensive set constructed in a London living room. Its alien bodies were hollow plaster casts filled with offal, sheep brains, and raspberry jam. Multiple participants in Alien Autopsy stated that misleading editing had removed their opinions that the footage was a hoax. Santilli admitted in 2006 that the film was a fake.

==== David Icke ====
The Branton Files are a series of documents espousing various conspiracy theories circulated on the internet since at least the mid-1990s. They are most often attributed to Bruce Alan Walton who claims to have been a victim of alien abduction and had contact through "altered states of consciousness" with humans "living in the inner earth". The files have been characterized as "high fantasy" filled with "complex and convoluted conspiracism". The content influenced David Icke.

In the 1990s, author David Icke proposed that world elites are actually "reptilian" aliens. Scholars note that the science-fiction franchise V had told a similar story from 1983 to 1984.

==== Phoenix Lights ====
A drawing of the Phoenix Lights

On March 13, 1997, there were widespread reports of unidentified lights over Nevada and Arizona. Arizona Governor Fife Symington III held a press conference, joking that "they found who was responsible" and revealing an aide dressed in an alien costume. Later, in 2007, Symington reportedly told a UFO investigator he'd had a personal close encounter with an alien spacecraft but remained silent "because he didn't want to panic the populace". According to Symington, "I'm a pilot and I know just about every machine that flies. It was bigger than anything that I've ever seen. It remains a great mystery. Other people saw it, responsible people... I don't know why people would ridicule it".

=== 2000s ===
In the early 2000s, the concept of "disclosure" became increasingly popular in the UFO conspiracy community: that the government had classified and withheld information on alien contact and full disclosure was needed, and was pursued by activist lobbying groups. In 1993, Steven M. Greer founded the Disclosure Project to promote the concept. In May 2001, Greer held a press conference at the National Press Club in Washington, D.C. that demanded Congress hold hearings on "secret U.S. involvement with UFOs and extraterrestrials". Disclosure Project's claims were met with by derision by skeptics and spokespeople for the United States Air Force. According to religious scholar Joseph Laycock, the idea behind "disclosure" predates modern UFO culture: in 1946, the editor of Amazing Stories magazine wrote, “If you think responsible parties in world governments are ignorant of the fact of space ships visiting Earth, you just don’t think the way we do”.

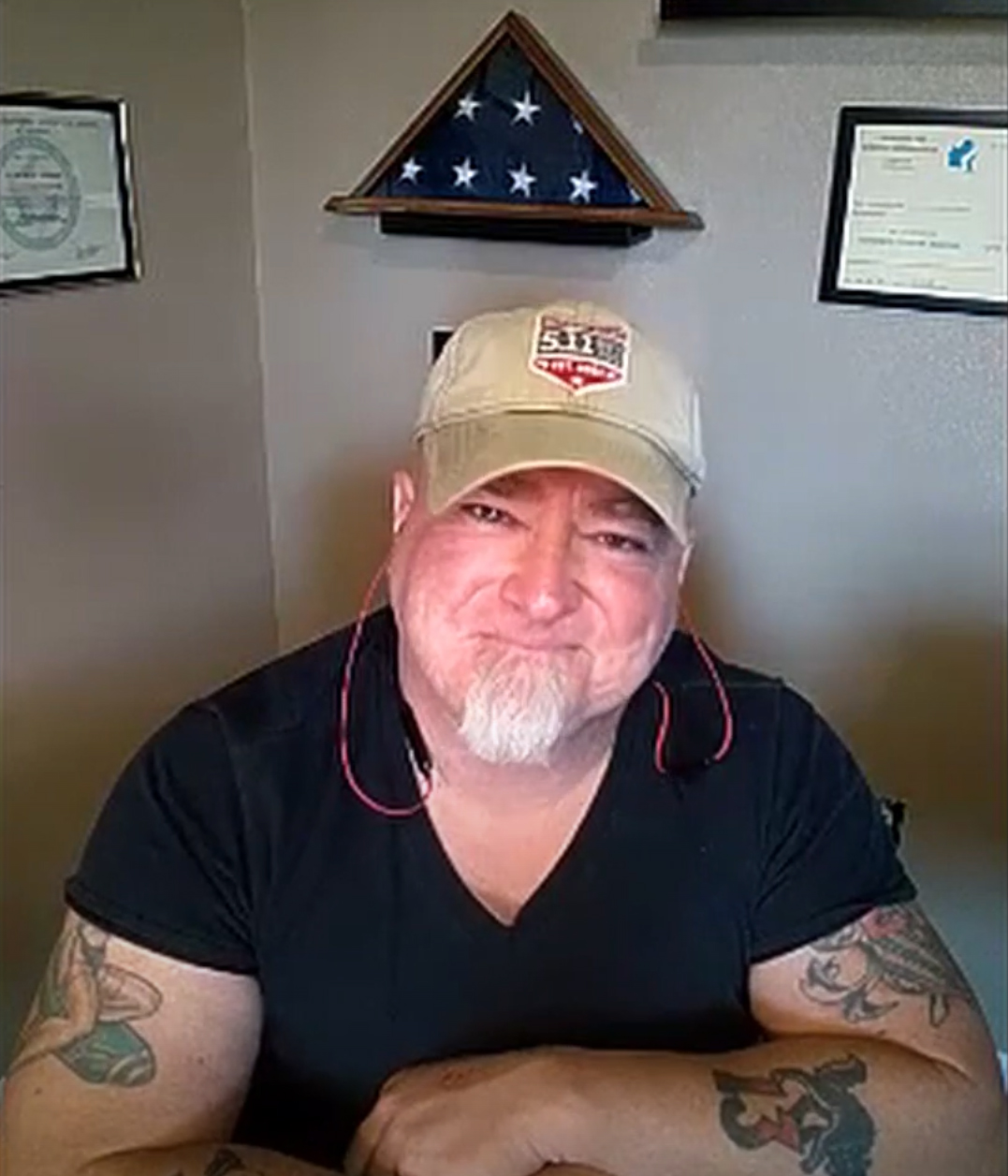
Luis Elizondo

In December 2017, The New York Times published a story about the Advanced Aerospace Threat Identification Program, a Defense Intelligence Agency program to study "unidentified aerial phenomenon" The program's director, Luis Elizondo claimed there is a government conspiracy to suppress evidence that UFOs are of "non-human" origin.

U.S. news media and Congressional leadership were criticized for giving credibility to unverified stories of alien visitations and government cover ups. Some commentators expressed concerns about "UFO cults and cult-like behavior, violence and cyber-stalking by UFO zealots". Astronomers, science writers and other experts observed that the increase in media publicity and government interest contrasted with "the widely held sentiment among scientists that, for decades, the media has lavished too much attention on sensational claims that vague lights in the sky are actually extraterrestrial spacecraft". Despite pressure by "disclosure" advocates fueled by anecdotes and hearsay of a government cover up, skeptical investigator Robert Sheaffer said "there is not going to be any "big reveal".

In June 2020, Donald Trump, when asked if he would consider releasing more information about the Roswell incident, said, "I won't talk to you about what I know about it, but it's very interesting." In December 2020, former president Obama joked with Stephen Colbert, "It used to be that UFOs and Roswell was the biggest conspiracy. And now that seems so tame, the idea that the government might have an alien spaceship."

From 2019 to 2021, David Grusch was the representative of the National Reconnaissance Office to the Unidentified Aerial Phenomena Task Force; Beginning in 2023, Grusch publicly claimed elements of the US government and its contractors were covering up evidence of UFOs and their reverse-engineering. Within the UFO community, Grusch's claims were seen as an indication that long-awaited "disclosure" was imminent.

Grusch "became a hot new topic in the UFO world" and his claims "ignited a new wave of interest in extraterrestrial life", but his story was criticized for its lack of verifiable evidence. According to science writer Mick West, "Grusch presented no documents (in public) and relied mostly on what he claimed to have been told by unnamed sources, things he could not share in detail". Scholars note Grusch's claims of a government cover-up of alien visitation are "broadly considered untrue by the majority of the scientific community".

In 2025, the Wall Street Journal revealed that hundreds of Air Force personnel had been told, falsely, that there was "a secret program to harvest alien technology". The piece described it as "a long-running practice" that was "like a fraternity hazing ritual that spun wildly out of control." The report also explained that a classified electromagnetic pulse test had been responsible for UFO reports and missiles going offline in 1967, explaining Robert Salas's account.

In March 2025, the documentary film The Age of Disclosure was shown at the SXSW film festival. Directed by Dan Farah, it features interviews with 34 military and intelligence veterans "with direct knowledge of or experience with UAPs". In the film, Jay Stratton, former Defense Intelligence Agency official and director of the government’s UAP Task Force, claims, “I have seen, with my own eyes, non-human craft and non-human beings.”

=== Timeline ===
- March 1945 - Palmer's Amazing Stories publishes Shaver's "I Remember Lemuria!"
- June 1946 - Palmer's Amazing Stories publishes Crisman's letter corroborating Shaver's claims
- July 1947 - Palmer hires original saucer witness Kenneth Arnold to investigate Crisman's Maury Island incident; USAF investigators killed in plane crash
- October 1947 - Palmer's Amazing Stories published letter by Shaver saying the truth behind the discs "will never be disclosed to common people".
- December 26, 1949 - Keyhoe's article "The Flying Saucers Are Real" published in True
- October 1949 - Scully's article on Aztec hoax introduces alien bodies
- 1952 - Arnold's The Coming of the Saucers introduces Maury Island hoax to wider audience
- April 1952 - "Have We Visitors From Space" published in Life Magazine
- July 31, 1952 - Samford press conference
- 1955 - Keyhoe authors The Flying Saucer Conspiracy links UFOs and Bermuda Triangle
- 1955 - Morris Jessup authors The Case for the UFO, an anonymously annotated copy of which introduces "The Philadelphia Experiment".
- 1956 - Ruppelt authors The Report on Unidentified Flying Objects
- 1956 - Chop's film Unidentified Flying Objects: The True Story of Flying Saucers released
- 1956 - Barker authors They Knew Too Much About Flying Saucers introduces Men in Black
- January 22, 1958 - Keyhoe mic cut on live TV
- March 20–21, 1966 - Michigan "swamp gas" UFO reports occur; Hynek's explanation is ridiculed
- April 3, 1968 - 2001: A Space Odyssey released
- October 31, 1968 - Crisman subpoenaed in Clay Shaw JFK assassination case
- January 9, 1969 - Crisman accused of being one of the three tramps
- 1974 - Emenegger releases film UFOs: Past, Present, and Future introduces summoned landing
- 1974 - Carr alleges alien bodies from Aztec are stored in "Hangar 18"
- 1974 - Hynek alleges a 'Cosmic Watergate'
- 1976 - Palmer links "flying saucers, The Shaver Mystery, The Kennedy’s assassinations, Watergate and Fred Crisman"
- November 16, 1977 - Close Encounters of the Third Kind released
- November 1979 - Jesse Marcel suggests Roswell was extraterrestrial in Friedman documentary
- November 12, 1980- Moulton Howe's documentary A Strange Harvest links cattle mutilations to UFOs.
- October 14, 1988 - UFO Cover Up? Live introduces Majestic 12 and Area 51 to wider audience
- July 1, 1989 - Bill Moore addresses MUFON
- November 1989 - Bob Lazar first televised interview
- 1991 - Cooper's Behold a Pale Horse published
- September 10, 1993 -The X-Files premieres
- 1995 - Phil Schneider gives Ike-Alien pact the name Greada Treaty
- July 3, 1996 - Independence Day premieres
- July 2, 1997 - Men in Black premieres
- December 16, 2017 - New York Times publishes story about AATIP and the Nimitz case

== Public opinion ==
A 2019 Gallup poll found that 33% of Americans believed some UFOs were alien spacecraft, while 68% believed the U.S. government knows "more about UFOs than it is telling us". In 2020, a CBS News poll found that 81% thought the government knew more than it was telling the public about UFOs, while 51% thought UFOs might be alien spacecraft.

== See also ==
- Alien abduction
- Area 51
- Brookings Report
- Cattle mutilation
- Crop circle
- Disclosure movement
- Flying saucer
- Robertson Panel
- Immaculate Constellation
- List of alleged extraterrestrial beings
- List of major UFO sightings
- Men in black
- Planetary objects proposed in religion, astrology, ufology and pseudoscience
- Project Blue Book
- Rendlesham Forest incident
- Roswell incident
- Secret space program
- Storm Area 51
- United States UFO files
- Violence by UFO believers
- Yankee Blue
