= Luis Elizondo =

US former military intelligence officer and UFO speaker

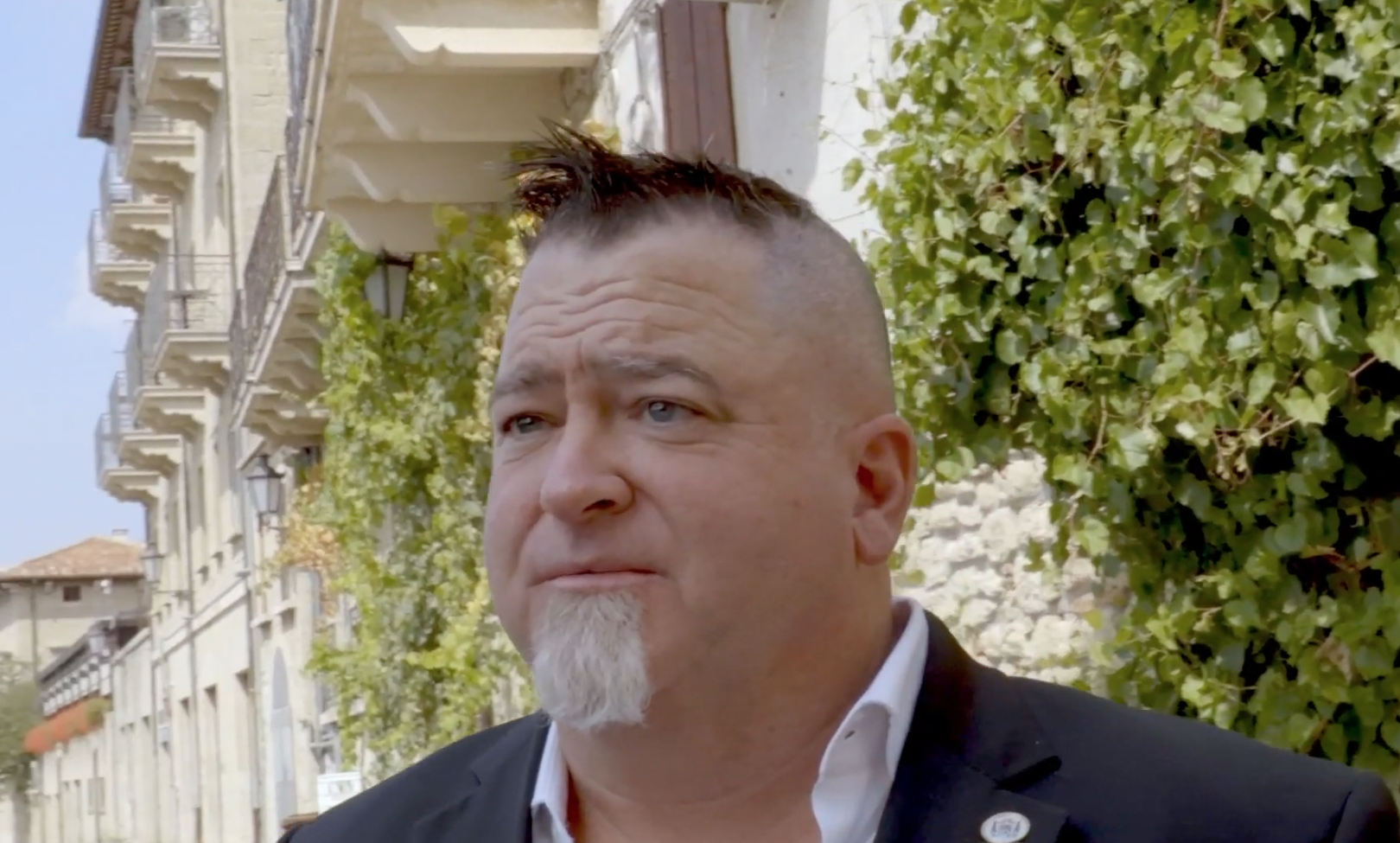
- Elizondo in 2021
- Born: Luis Daniel Elizondo; Texas, United States
- Other name: "Lue" Elizondo
- Education: University of Miami
- Occupations: Former Military intelligence officer, author
- Organization(s): Department of Defense, U.S. Army Counterintelligence, Office of the Under Secretary of Defense for Intelligence, Advanced Aerospace Threat Identification Program, To the Stars Academy of Arts and Sciences
- Movement: Disclosure movement
- Website: luiselizondo-official.com

Luis Elizondo is an American author, media personality and UFO disclosure activist formerly employed by the United States Department of Defense.

Elizondo claims that some UFOs are of extraterrestrial, cryptid, or "interdimensional" origin, and that the US Government is withholding and suppressing this information. He has been criticized for not offering physical evidence for his assertions, and for presenting images of mundane objects, such as light fixtures and irrigation circles, as possible alien spaceships.

== Early life and education ==
Elizondo is the son of Luis Elizondo III, a Cuban exile who volunteered for Brigade 2506, a CIA-sponsored group of exiles formed in 1960 to attempt the military overthrow of the Cuban government headed by Fidel Castro, which culminated in the Bay of Pigs invasion. According to his 2024 memoir, Elizondo grew up being trained for Alpha 66, which he describes as a "slightly rebranded Brigade 2506".

Elizondo was born in Texas. Elizondo graduated from Riverview High School in Sarasota, Florida. At the University of Miami, Elizondo studied microbiology and immunology.

== Government career ==
=== United States Army intelligence ===
Elizondo enlisted in 1995 and served in the United States Army with service in the Republic of Korea, Kuwait, and in the United States, and then as a civilian intelligence officer during which he ran military intelligence operations in Afghanistan, South America, and the Guantanamo Bay detention camp and its Camp Seven. Elizondo ran anti-terrorist missions against the Islamic State (ISIS), al-Qaeda and the Lebanese militant group Hezbollah.

=== Department of Defense ===
Starting in 2008, Elizondo worked with the Office of the Under Secretary of Defense for Intelligence (OUSDI) in the Pentagon. Elizondo has reported that he worked with officials from the U.S. Navy and the CIA out of his Pentagon office for this program until 2017.

=== Advanced Aerospace Threat Identification Program ===
Elizondo was allegedly recruited in 2009 to the Advanced Aerospace Threat Identification Program (AATIP), a government program to investigate aerial threats including unidentified aerial phenomena. At AATIP, Elizondo was reputedly tasked with investigating "the national-security implications of military U.A.P. encounters". Elizondo told a reporter he thought that he might have been selected for AATIP because of his scientific background, work as a counterintelligence agent protecting American aerospace technology, and lack of interest in science fiction. Writer Keith Kloor reported in 2019 that Elizondo was asked to take over management of security for AATIP, describing Elizondo as among a group of "believers in extraterrestrial visitations", and that performance evaluations of Elizondo's work as a government employee were favorable. According to the Department of Defense, the AATIP program ended in 2012 due to budget cuts. However, Elizondo's role within the AATIP has been questioned, including by Keith Kloor who originally supported his claims, and there is a lack of confirming evidence that he was involved in the program.

Government spokespeople have issued alternating and conflicting accounts of his role in government, both confirming and denying his intelligence work related to the topics of unidentified flying objects (UFOs) and unidentified anomalous phenomenon (UAPs). Elizondo has been called a "leader" with responsibility for management of security for AATIP. In 2017, Elizondo was confirmed as an AATIP leader by Pentagon spokeswoman Dana White to Politico. In June 2019, Pentagon spokesperson Christopher Sherwood confirmed that AATIP "did pursue research and investigation into unidentified aerial phenomena", and added to The Intercept that Elizondo "had no responsibilities with regard to the AATIP program while he worked in OUSDI, up until the time he resigned". Senator Harry Reid sent a letter in 2021 to NBC News stating, "As one of the original sponsors of AATIP, I can state as a matter of record Lue Elizondo’s involvement and leadership role in this program". Garry Reid, who served as director of Defense Intelligence at the USDI office, stated in a memo that Elizondo “aggrandized his role” and that “to the best of my knowledge, [Elizondo] had no job responsibilities related to the AATIP.”

In response, Elizondo filed a complaint with the Department of Defense Office of Inspector General describing "a coordinated campaign to discredit him for speaking out" including "Pentagon press statements asserting he had no official role in UFO research, even after his role was officially confirmed". In the Inspector General's complaint, Elizondo also alleged that he was the target of "a personal vendetta from a Pentagon rival", who attempted to harm his career via investigations of Elizondo's role in the 2017 release of the Pentagon UFO videos.

=== Government resignation ===
In late 2017, Elizondo resigned to protest what he characterized as "excessive secrecy and internal opposition".

== Post-government activities ==
=== United States Navy UFO videos ===
After resigning in 2017, Elizondo gave three videos to reporters made by pilots from the United States Navy aircraft carriers USS Nimitz and USS Theodore Roosevelt which were then publicized in the New York Times. The Times story also publicized the existence of AATIP. CNN reported that Elizondo expressed his belief that UFOs depicted were not of human origin. Most of the videos had terrestrial explanations; according to The Guardian mental health reporter Daniel Lavelle, one, referred to as "Go Fast" as it purportedly exhibited unusual speed, "required grade-school geometry to figure out that it wasn't anything special or even going fast". NASA's own assessment of the video concluded that parallex had created a deceptive appearance of speed.

The classification status of the videos and the validity of Elizondo's authorization to distribute them were questioned. In 2020, Pentagon spokesperson Susan Gough told Popular Mechanics that "The videos were not cleared for general public release because DOPSR (the Defense Office of Prepublication and Security Review) did not receive final approval from Navy". Gough said that a later investigation "determined the videos were not classified". Popular Mechanics noted that Elizondo was cleared of wrongdoing by the Pentagon's admission of DOPSR accidentally clearing the videos for release, but observed he had faced scrutiny for labeling the videos as "UAV, Balloons, and UAS" in his release requests.

=== To the Stars Academy of Arts and Sciences ===
After resigning from the government, Elizondo joined To the Stars Academy of Arts and Sciences (TTSA). A History Channel series titled Unidentified: Inside America's UFO Investigation, produced by TTSA, featured Elizondo. Elizondo along with Christopher Mellon left TTSA in late 2020 to focus on government lobbying for UFO transparency.

=== Subsequent UFO-related activity ===
In a 2021 interview with GQ, Elizondo stated that UFOs/UAPs were "just as likely" to have originated from outer space, as from another dimension, and they might use hydrogen found in water to "warp space time", though he said "I also think it’s possible that [UFOs/UAPs are] something that has been on Earth for a very long time." Elizondo has stated he believes the US government to be in possession of "exotic material" associated with UAPs. According to The Guardian's Daniel Lavelle, Elizondo's analysis jumps "to the most far-fetched hypothesis, presenting it as if they had eliminated all prosaic possibilities".

In 2025, Elizondo participated in the McMenamins Hotel Oregon UFO Festival at the McMinnville Community Center in McMinnville, Oregon.

In November 2024 Elizondo testified before a joint hearing of United States House Oversight Subcommittee on National Security entitled "Unidentified Anomalous Phenomena: Exposing the Truth" where he claimed the government has conducted secret retrievals of UFOs and alien bodies. Elizondo's claims have been criticized as lacking direct evidence, and a statement from a Pentagon spokesperson said the department “has not found any verifiable evidence that any UAP observation represented extraterrestrial activity nor has the department discovered any verifiable information to substantiate claims that any programs regarding the possession or reverse-engineering of extraterrestrial materials have existed in the past or exist currently”.

Elizondo is a research affiliate to The Galileo Project. In 2023, Art Levine reported that both Elizondo and Mellon had lobbied in support of the National Defense Authorization Act for Fiscal Year 2022, which included a provision to investigate UFO-related topics and to create the Pentagon's All-domain Anomaly Resolution Office. Levine noted that Elizondo had "become a lightning rod for a dangerous new rage that is overtaking some conspiracy-oriented UFO believers and influencers, who are demanding 'disclosure now' by the government about its purported encounters with aliens".

==== Questioned and spurious claims ====
A former co-worker of Elizondo's, Jeremy McGowan, has charged Elizondo with frequently fabricating information. According to McGowan, Elizondo once showed him what he claimed was footage captured by a Soviet spacecraft near Mars, but that McGowan later identified as old publicity film of Phobos 2.

Sometime between 2022 and 2023, Elizondo told the All-domain Anomaly Resolution Office that he was once in possession of files that contained proof of a secret program of the U.S. Government that collected evidence of space aliens, that the files were in a locked drawer in his former office, and that a former colleague had confirmed the files were still in that location. Several hours later, in response to the claim, FBI special agents sealed and searched Elizondo's former office but found nothing of the nature he'd described. Elizondo's former supervisor said he had never heard of such a program from Elizondo during their several years of work together.

At a speaking event in 2024, Elizondo presented a photo that included what he claimed was an alien "mothership", that he said had been taken from the U.S. embassy in Romania, and which he asserted was given to him by a government contact. Subsequent research by John Greenewald and others found that the image was actually taken more than 400 miles away from the embassy, that it had first appeared on a Facebook group in 2023, and that it was a photo of a light fixture reflected in a window.

In May 2025, at a hearing on UFOs sponsored by the UAP Disclosure Fund, according to Futurism Elizondo "showed off a peculiar image of what appeared to be a gigantic, disc-shaped object floating hundreds of feet above the ground," described by Elizondo as "potentially anywhere between 600 and 1,000 feet in diameter ... it's a lenticular object, and it is silver". Mick West agreed with analysis of commenters on Reddit's UFO community that the object was actually an irrigation circle.

Elizondo claims to possess extraordinary powers, such as psychic abilities.

=== Work and livelihood ===
Since leaving government employment, Elizondo earns money through UFO-themed book and TV deals; according to The Guardian mental health reporter Daniel Lavelle, he enjoys "a loyal cult following on the internet, lapping up his every word and attacking anyone who doubts him". He also owned and operated a cocktail lounge in Buffalo, Wyoming from 2025 to 2026. In September 2026, he filed a lawsuit against his partner in the cocktail lounge.

=== Publications ===
Imminent: Inside the Pentagon's Hunt for UFOs
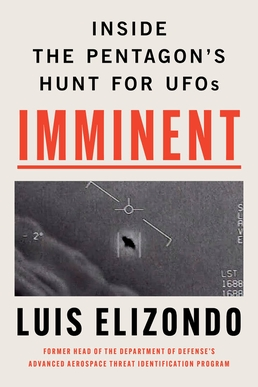
- Author: Luis Elizondo
- Language: English
- Publisher: Harper Collins
- Publication date: August 20, 2024
- Publication place: United States
- Media type: Print (hardcover)
- Pages: 304
- ISBN: 978-0063235564

==== Imminent: Inside the Pentagon's Hunt for UFOs ====
Elizondo's memoir, Imminent: Inside the Pentagon’s Hunt for UFOs, was published in August 2024 and debuted at number one on The New York Times Best Seller list. In the book, Elizondo states that late in his military and intelligence career, he was recruited by Pentagon officials to manage security and counterintelligence for a deeply classified UFO-related research program. In the book, Elizondo claims that four non-human bodies were recovered from Roswell.

In his memoir, Elizondo claims that a UFO crash retrieval program has been operating in secret for "decades" administrated by "a supersecret umbrella group made up of government officials working with defense and aerospace contractors", and that "technology and biological remains" of extraterrestrial origin have been retrieved from these crashes. Elizondo also claims that for several years his home was "invaded" by floating, glowing orbs that were seen by his family and neighbors. According to Elizondo, he was involved in a military remote viewing program under parapsychologist Harold E. Puthoff.

==== Reckoning: The Unspoken Truth about UFOs and the Urgency of Now ====
Elizondo's planned second book, Reckoning: The Unspoken Truth about UFOs and the Urgency of Now, is scheduled for release in August 2026, according to publisher HarperCollins. The book is to be released by HarperCollins' Mudlark imprint, which publishes books covering eclectic topics with commercial appeal.

== See also ==
- David Grusch
- Unidentified Aerial Phenomena Task Force
- Yankee Blue
