= Above Majestic =

2018 American documentary film

- Directed by: Roger R. Richards
- Produced by: Corey Goode, Brandon Graham, David Wilcock
- Release date: 2018
- Running time: 133 minutes
- Country: United States
- Language: English

Above Majestic is a 2018 documentary film that posits a global conspiracy involving anthropomorphic alien reptiles who secretly control the world's governments. The film was the most successful documentary of 2018 on iTunes.

According to Vice, Above Majestic advances the theory that "reptilian aliens occupy large swaths of Antarctica, are massing for an invasion, and control the world’s governments and banks". The documentary also makes the case that the September 11 attacks were a purported attempt to conceal an alien conspiracy.

In 2021, researchers at Logically reported that the person operating the influential, QAnon-linked Twitter handle qthewakeup may have assisted in the filming of the documentary.
