= Disclosure movement =

Social movement about UFOs and aliens

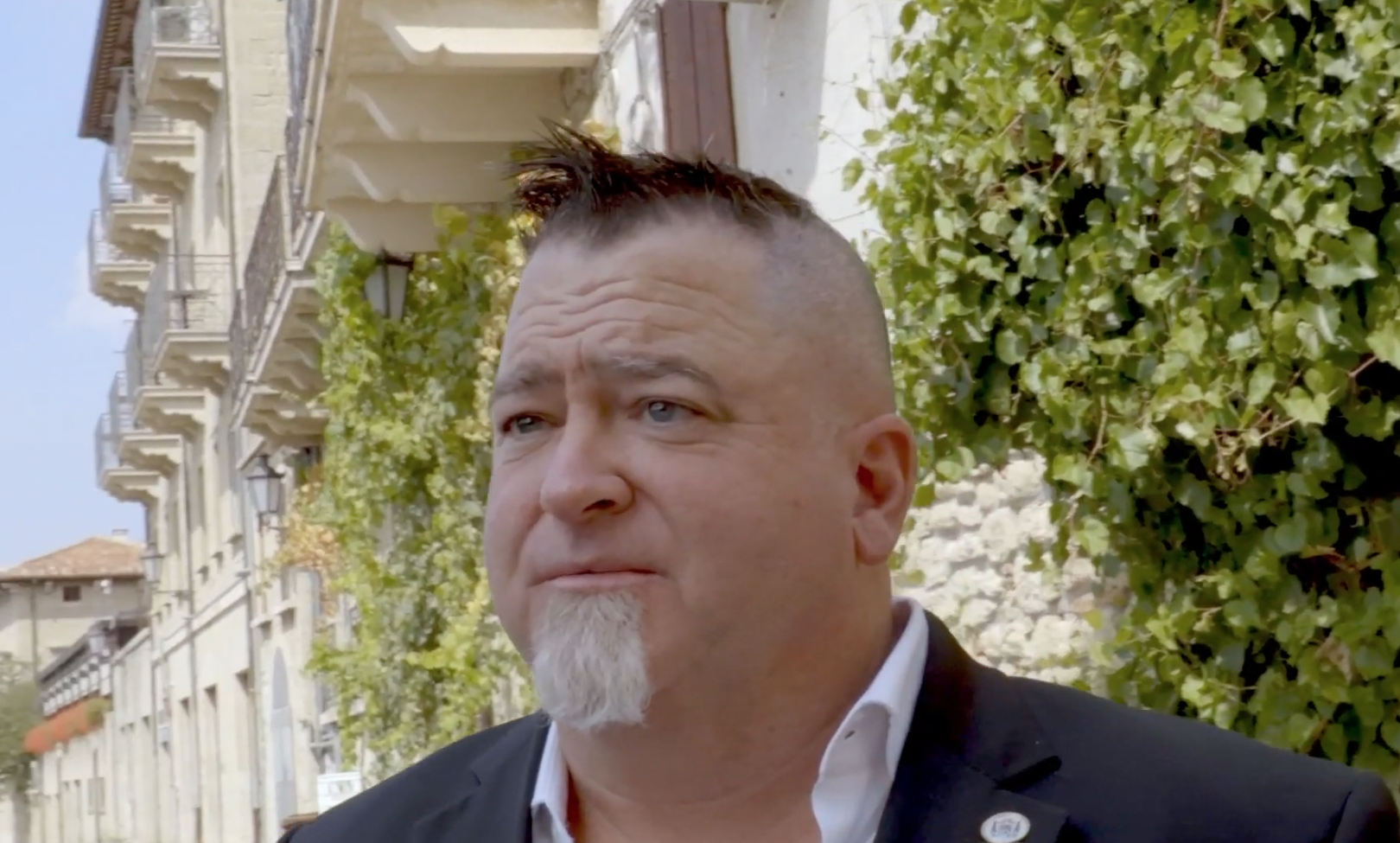
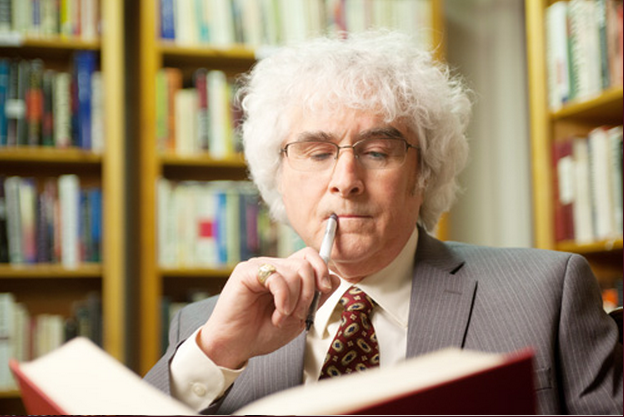
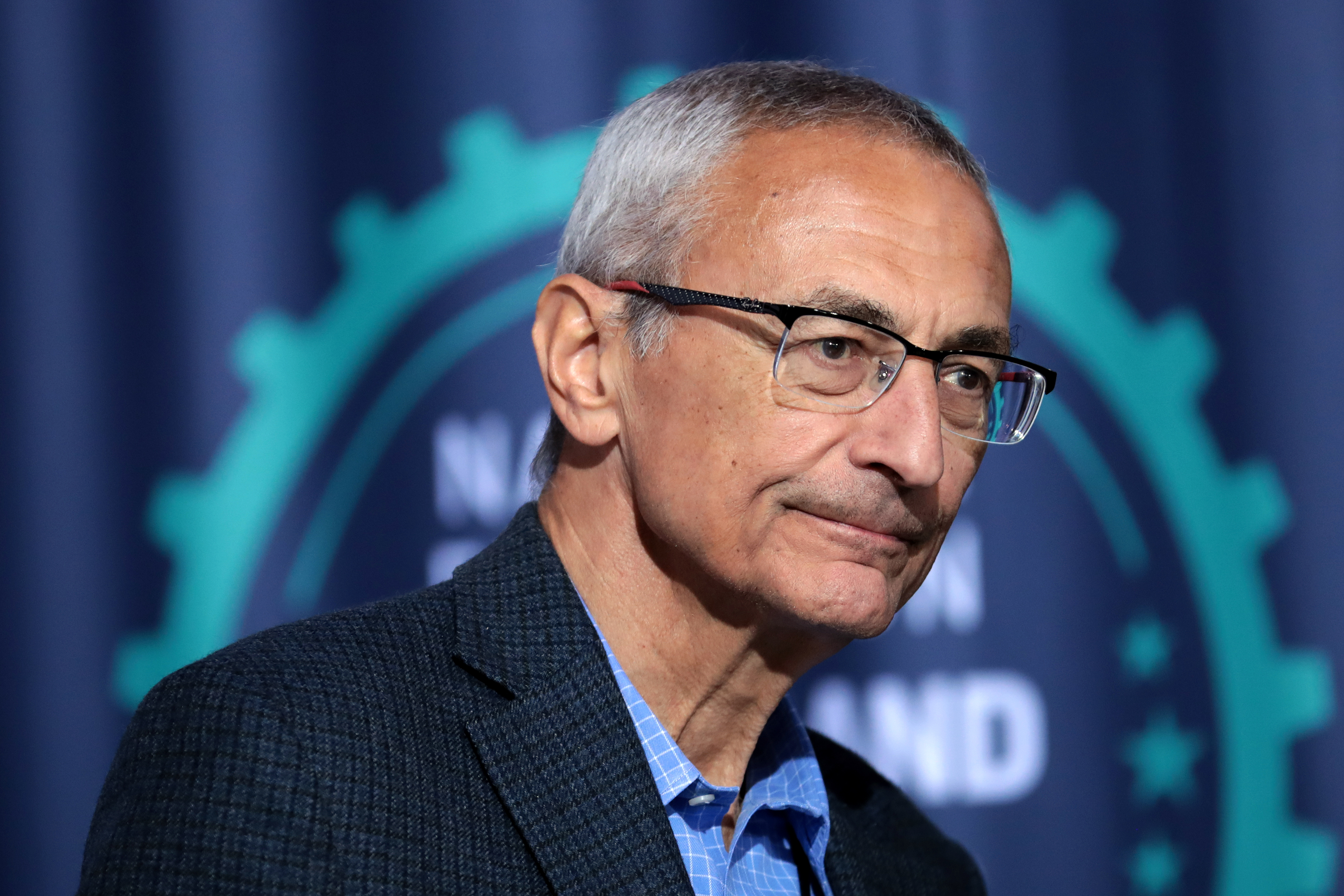
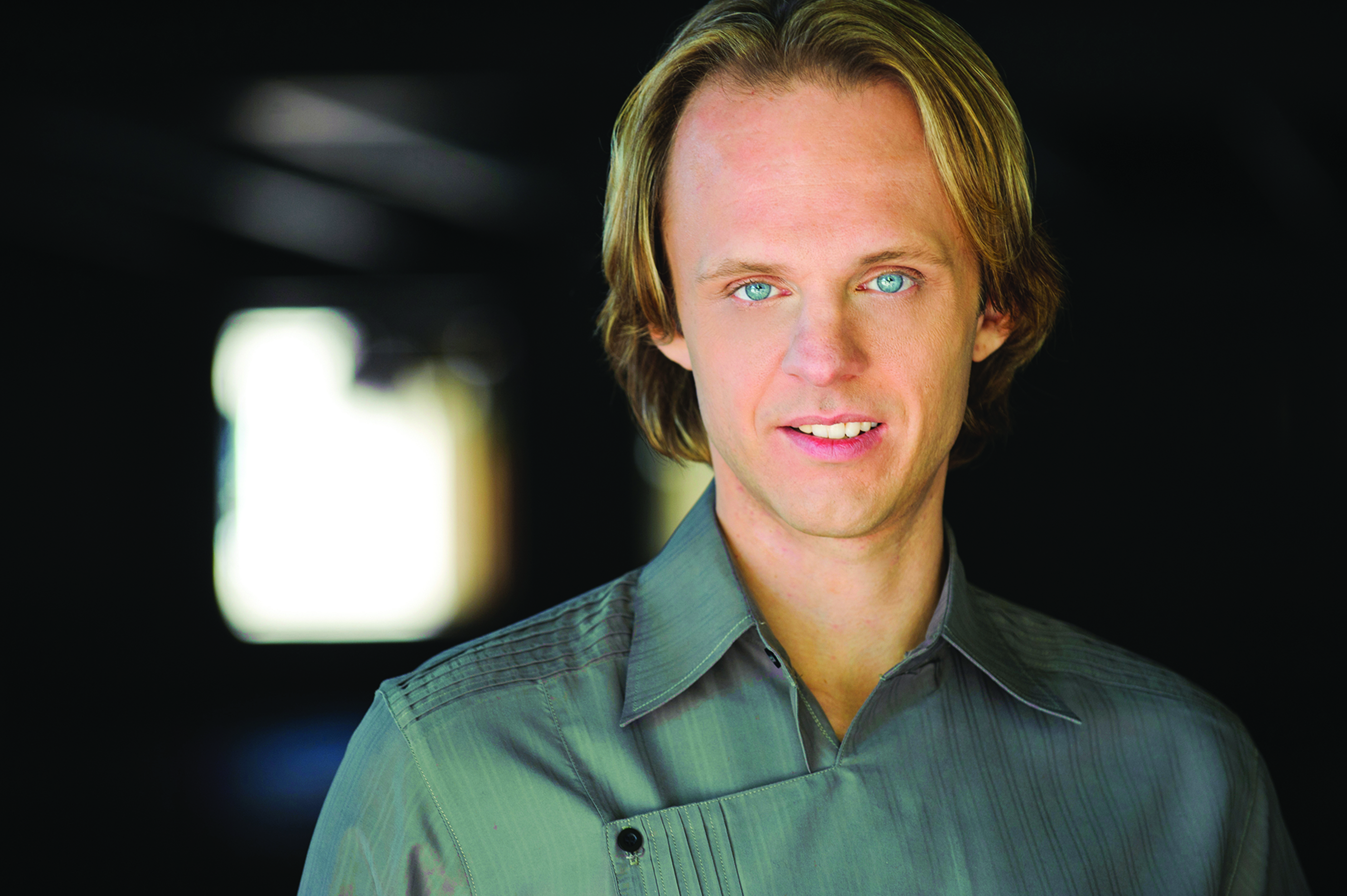
- Notable advocates for disclosure include (clockwise, from top): Luis Elizondo, John Podesta, David Wilcock, and Daniel Sheehan
- Years active: 1990s to present
- Major figures: Steven Greer, David Wilcock, Luis Elizondo, David Fravor, Christopher Mellon, Harry Reid, Chuck Schumer, Jeremy Corbell, Daniel Sheehan
- Influenced: Secret space program

The disclosure movement is a social movement that argues in favor of various conspiracy theories which allege that governments generally, or the United States government specifically, have secret information regarding UFOs and "non-human intelligence" – variously described as space aliens; "interdimensional" beings; beings originating on Earth or native to the atmosphere; demons; and even time travelers. The movement advocates for the supposed information to be declassified for purposes of human, social, and scientific advancement. The disclosure movement prophesizes a future event or process called "disclosure" that will mark the date upon which such declassification occurs.

Adherents of the disclosure movement have variously predicted that Barack Obama, Hillary Clinton, Joe Biden, Donald Trump, or Pope Leo XIV are on the verge of initiating disclosure. The movement has been occasionally framed by observers as comparable to a system of religious belief. Some notable disclosure advocates are David Wilcock, Steven Greer, and Christopher Mellon.

== Beliefs ==
The disclosure movement is a loose-knit movement whose adherents generally believe governments control secret information regarding UFOs and space aliens, and who advocate for its public release for commercial, spiritual, humanitarian, or scientific reasons. "Disclosure" is the climactic event towards which those in the disclosure movement aspire and, according to journalist Anna Merlan, is believed by them to be "the time when the world’s governments will finally reveal everything they know about UFOs, extraterrestrials, and alien technology". Those associated with the disclosure movement have variously predicted U.S. presidents Obama, Clinton, and Trump would initiate disclosure during their presidencies. Following the enthronement of Pope Leo XIV, University of Tennessee at Chattanooga professor Kody W. Cooper noted that some speculated he would be "the disclosure pope" and would "reveal the Vatican's UFO 'secrets'".

According to journalist Alex Seitz-Wald, "the movement has long believed the government is covering up the greatest secret in history". Advocate Stephen Greer has claimed, "aliens are here to help us and the military-industrial complex is hyping their danger and creating the U.S. Space Force to prepare for interplanetary war", and films such as Independence Day are indicative of "a false narrative created by covert groups striving to generate fear of ETs". On the internet forum AboveTopSecret, described as "a hub of ufology and conspiracy theories", adherents have debated whether government efforts to make files of UFO reports more accessible represent "the beginning of the end of the alleged cover-up or its revival". UFO lobbyist Stephen Bassett lauded the new efforts as part of a strategy by former insiders "to finally force the government to reveal that it has had contact with aliens for decades". Regarding potential revelations of extraterrestrial contact and alien technology, disclosure advocate Christopher Mellon said, "This is the biggest discovery in human history". While testifying before Congress, disclosure media figure Luis Elizondo accused the government of a cover-up, saying, "You have information being locked away that can change the trajectory of [our] species".

Within the context of UFO disclosure and transparency advocacy, the term "non-human intelligence" has been used to refer to entities claimed to be responsible for UFOs; however, beliefs vary regarding how the term is defined. The extraterrestrial UFO hypothesis proposes that some UFOs are best explained as being physical spacecraft occupied by intelligent extraterrestrial organisms from other planets, or probes designed by extraterrestrials. Disclosure advocate Leslie Kean has proposed that UFOs might be of interdimensional origin. The cryptoterrestrial hypothesis proposes that reports of flying saucers or UFOs are evidence of a hidden, Earth-based, technologically advanced civilization, or unknown animal life forms. The time-traveler hypothesis proposes that UFOs are evidence of humans traveling from the future using advanced technology. Christian fundamentalists and others have claimed that UFOs are evidence of a satanic influence, or are themselves demons.

Mark Pilkington has written about the paradoxical beliefs of disclosure, noting that "Disclosure's advocates claim that what they want is truth, but what they actually want is to have their existing beliefs about UFOs and extraterrestrials confirmed by a government they already distrust on the issue." Hari Kunzru writes that adherents' belief that beneficial societal changes will result from the sudden revelation of hidden knowledge shows the disclosure movement has a spiritual dimension: "The idea of fighting against secretive bureaucratic evil to bring about a transcendent moment of collective cooperation is a sort of secularized Gnosticism, and it has continued to reappear, in one form or another, since the first sightings in the late Forties." Merlan explains that disclosure advocates use "the language of end-times preachers who describe a coming climactic battle, a grand revelation, a final decisive moment when humanity will be divided into the drowned and the saved".

== History ==
"Proofs"

They hold that they won’t turn over the info, that it is like an atom bomb in importance, and they are keeping it in their own hands... I am saying that if our scientists were ALLOWED to have but one of these machines (which exist in great profusion and in fine repair) for study, that our whole technical development would be accelerated beyond imagination.

— Richard Shaver, describing a conspiracy to suppress high technology originating with a secret, hidden race, Amazing Stories (June 1947)

While the roots of the disclosure movement can be traced to the 1940s and the work of Raymond A. Palmer and Richard Shaver, disclosure is distinct from earlier conspiracy theories that posit government secrecy about UFOs in that it simultaneously advocates for the end of such secrecy as a means for human civilization to capitalize on purported valuable alien technology. As early as 1952, the US Air Force had acknowledged reports from "credible observers of relatively incredible things", but cautioned that "there has been no pattern that reveals anything remotely like purpose or remotely like consistency that we can in any way associate with any menace to the United States".

In 1955, The Flying Saucer Conspiracy by Donald Keyhoe argued for an end to a supposed cover-up. By 1963, Keyhoe, citing conversations with members of Congress, called for "full disclosure of UFO facts" and publicly predicted "some action in a few months", though no major announcement occurred in the ensuing months. In 1977, the US News and World Report published a claim that 'unsettling disclosures' about UFOs would be announced by the CIA before the end of the year; none emerged.

=== Origins ===
External videos
- UFO Anti-Secrecy Group Demonstration
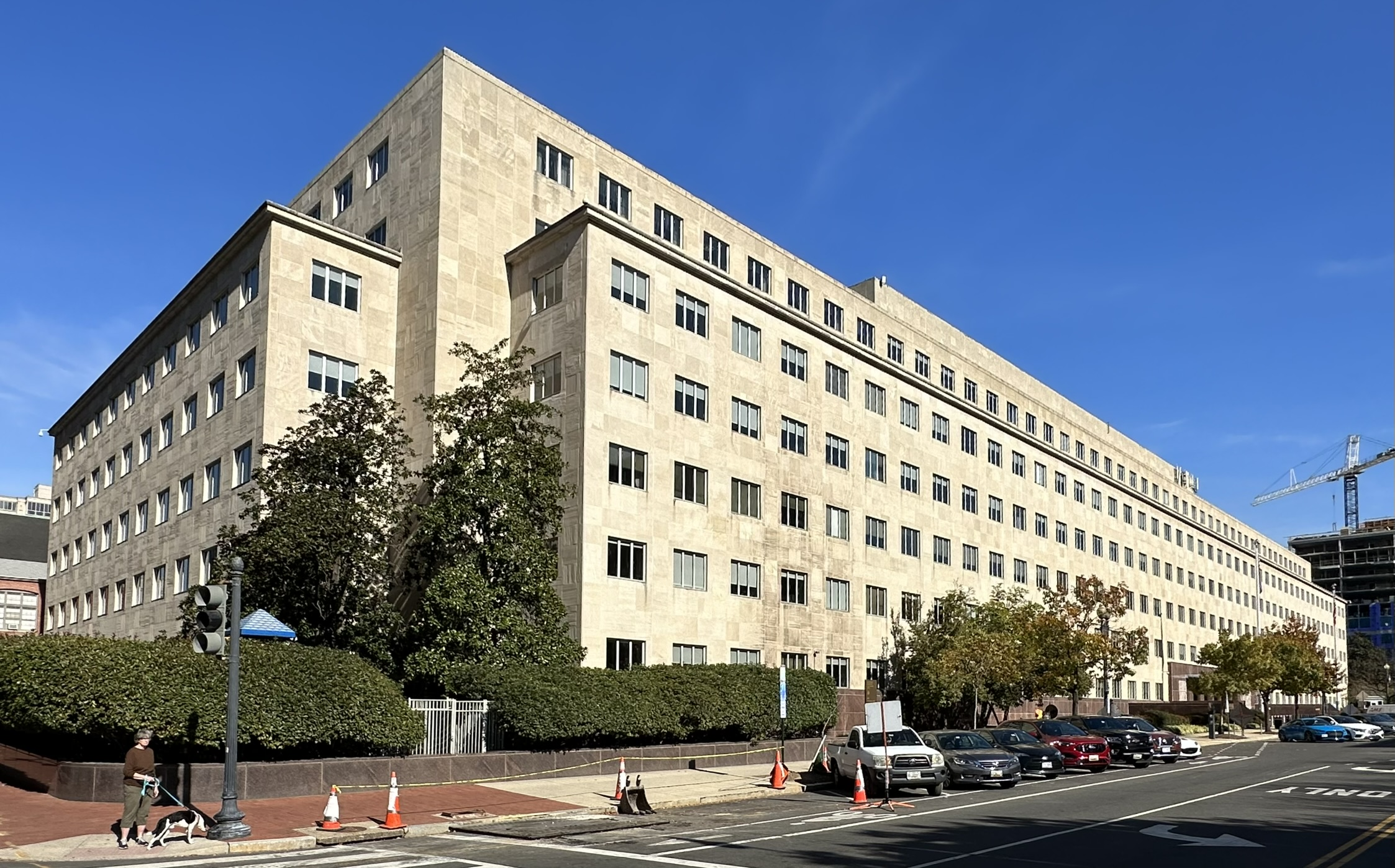
- Associated Press footage of a 1995 protest by disclosure advocates at the GAO
- (via YouTube)

Steven Greer, who claims to have seen a flying saucer as a child, is widely regarded as a prime influence of the disclosure movement, having popularized the term "disclosure" to refer to advocacy for the end of this perceived cover-up in the early 1990s, and Greer himself identifies as the founder of "the worldwide disclosure movement". In 1993, he established The Disclosure Project which, according to Religion Dispatches, "encourages the government to disclose the reality of UFOs, as well as advanced technologies like alternative energy that could save the planet". Some persons affiliated with Greer's initiatives practice his "CE-5" protocol which attempts to directly commune with space aliens via meditation as a means of compelling disclosure, and Greer commercially markets "Ambassador to the Universe" trainings to teach CE-5.

=== 2010 – 2016 ===
On September 27, 2010, Robert Salas appeared at the National Press Club in Washington D.C., along with other UFO speakers, where he told a tale of the Malmstrom UFO incident, where a UFO report was allegedly linked to nuclear missiles going off-line. In 2011, George Knapp reported that "the UFO crowd" hoped that Obama would be "the disclosure president" but got "on to something else" after Obama – responding to a 2011 We the People petition – affirmed there was nothing to disclose. Even after Obama's statement, some in the disclosure movement, such as advocate Stephen Bassett, continued to assert he would be "the disclosure president".

In 2013, Bassett organized a publicity event called the Citizen Hearing on Disclosure in which purported UFO witnesses provided testimony to six former members of the United States Congress with Carolyn Cheeks Kilpatrick presiding over the meeting. Each of the six former members of Congress was paid $20,000, plus expenses, to attend. During the hearing, Paul Hellyer alleged that two space aliens were coaching U.S. government officials about clean energy and that this was being suppressed by the petroleum industry. According to the New York Daily News, the event was attended by about 100 members of the public, including Louis Farrakhan, Hollow Earth advocates, and people dressed in space alien costumes. Members of the public could also stream the event online for four dollars.

In 2015, Clinton aide John Podesta posted a statement saying "my biggest failure of 2014: Once again not securing the #disclosure of the UFO files", adding the hashtag "#thetruthisstilloutthere". The following year when Podesta's emails were published by Wikileaks, the contents were noted for their discussion of UFOs. Podesta's UFO comments were a factor in leading some in the disclosure movement to believe that Hillary Clinton would spearhead disclosure. After her loss, the TV show Ancient Aliens speculated that the CIA had interfered in the election in order to foil disclosure. In October 2017, the company To The Stars Inc. was founded by Tom DeLonge (guitarist of Blink-182), parapsychologist Harold E. Puthoff, and author Jim Semivan. Personnel included disclosure advocates Christopher Mellon and Luis Elizondo. In December of that year, the company provided the first of what became known as the "Pentagon UFO videos" to the press.

=== 2017 – 2021 ===
"FLIR" video, recorded by US Navy Lt. Commander Chad Underwood of the USS Nimitz

Enthusiasm for disclosure accelerated on December 16, 2017 when the New York Times published a story with the sensational headline "Glowing Auras and ‘Black Money’: The Pentagon’s Mysterious U.F.O. Program" that reported on the Advanced Aerospace Threat Identification Program and popularized speculations that the government might soon reveal "what it knows about UFOs". The same Times story included the first of a series of videos of UFOs filmed by US Navy pilots and claimed by advocates to depict vehicles representing "extraordinary technology". The videos further spurred interest in claims of secret government UFO files and extraterrestrial encounters. Disclosure advocates Harry Reid, Luis Elizondo, and Tom DeLonge expressed their hope that the release of the videos was only the beginning of further revelations to come. In 2019, Navy fighter pilot Ryan Graves founded the group Americans for Safe Aerospace to "advocate for more disclosure by the military and other government agencies".

During 2021, personalities ranging from Director of National Intelligence John Ratcliffe to former President Obama shared their thoughts about UFOs, with Obama saying that footage and records of unidentified objects exist, but dismissing claims of extraterrestrial encounters. In covering Obama's comments, CNN noted "Believing UFOs are real does not require believing in aliens; UFOs are simply unidentified flying objects. There is no assumption they contain other life forms." In April, Harry Reid published a letter attesting that Elizondo held a leadership role in the AATIP program. In August, news magazine 60 Minutes aired an in-depth report on UAP claims.

=== Since 2022 ===
In 2022, the U.S. Congress held a public hearing on UFOs, the first since 1969. In 2023, Senate majority leader Chuck Schumer proposed legislation to expedite the disclosure of UFO-related information. That year, Art Levine wrote that "UFO Messiah" Luis Elizondo had "become a lightning rod for a dangerous new rage that is overtaking some conspiracy-oriented UFO believers and influencers, who are demanding 'disclosure now' by the government about its purported encounters with aliens". Also in 2023, retired Air Force intelligence officer David Grusch testified before Congress, claiming the existence of a secret crash-retrieval and reverse-engineering program involving extraterrestrials, but did not provide any evidence beyond what he said he had read or was told by others. Grusch expressed his hope that disclosure would provide an "ontological (earth-shattering) shock" that would unite mankind and usher in an era of global cooperation. Responding to Grusch's testimony, Stephen Bassett said "this thing is getting ready to blow sky high" and that President of the United States Joe Biden would confirm the existence of extraterrestrials within "two weeks" of the congressional hearing. Also that year, Garrett Graff cited a December 2020 interview with CIA director John Brennan as the primary inspiration for his latest book. According to Graff, Brennan "admitted, somewhat tortuously, that he was flummoxed by the wave of recent reporting about UFOs: 'Some of the phenomena we’re going to be seeing continues to be unexplained and might, in fact, be some type of phenomenon that is the result of something that we don’t yet understand and that could involve some type of activity that some might say constitutes a different form of life.'" In the aftermath of Brennan's comments, science writer Joel Achenbach told readers "Sorry to disappoint you... but there's zero evidence of aliens".

According to the Washington Spectator, "a common trope of self-described whistleblowers such as David Grusch, Luis Elizondo and Eric Davis [is] that they've signed Non-Disclosure Agreements (NDAs) or have other restrictions on what they can say" which prevents them from providing the definitive evidence that would prove the veracity of their assertions. The U.S. Government has indicated it is unaware of the existence of any such claimed NDAs. In March 2024, the All-domain Anomaly Resolution Office, a government office created in response to disclosure advocacy, released a report which affirmed the absence of UFO information available to disclose. The report also, indirectly, implicated some prominent disclosure advocates in advancing specious ideas of a cover-up. The Washington Spectator reported that, in the aftermath of that report and "to fill the vacuum their gradual demise has made possible", belief in the secret space program story was revisited by some UFO followers.

In 2025, the Wall Street Journal revealed that hundreds of Air Force personnel had been told, falsely, that there was "a secret program to harvest alien technology". The piece described it as "a long-running practice" that was "like a fraternity hazing ritual that spun wildly out of control." The report also explained that a classified electromagnetic pulse test had been responsible for UFO reports and missiles going offline in 1967, explaining Robert Salas's account. U.S. Congress subcommittees have held hearings advocating for government transparency since 2022, led by "a small group of policymakers who have been steadily prioritizing whistleblower hearings, public engagement sessions and other legislative efforts to promote more accountability and disclosure" regarding UFOs. In September 2025, a hearing hosted by Representative Anna Paulina Luna included statements by former Air Force and Navy personnel Jeffrey Nuccetelli, Dyland Borland, and Alexandro Wiggins, as well as George Knapp, described as "a prominent figure in the UFO disclosure community and frequent guest on the alien and paranormal-focused overnight radio show Coast to Coast AM".

== Adherents ==
In addition to Greer, notable persons who have been associated with the disclosure movement or identified as advocates for disclosure, are: David Wilcock, Daniel Sheehan, Luis Elizondo, John Podesta, Harry Reid, Garry Nolan, Timothy Gallaudet, Christopher Mellon, Ross Coulthart, and David Fravor.

== Media ==
=== Books ===
- Fawcett, Lawrence; Greenwood, Barry J. (1984). The UFO Cover-up: What the Government Won't Say. Prentice-Hall Press. ISBN 978-0-13-137712-7.
- Greer, Steven M. (2001). Disclosure: military and government witnesses reveal the greatest secrets in modern history. Crozer, VA: Crossing Point. ISBN 978-0-9673238-1-7.
- Clarke, David; Roberts, Andy (2002). Out of the shadows: UFOs, the establishment & the official cover-up. London: Piatkus. ISBN 978-0-7499-2290-0.
- Kean, Leslie (2010). UFOs: Generals, Pilots and Government Officials Go on the Record. Harmony Books. ISBN 978-0-307-71684-2.
- Dolan, Richard M.; Zabel, Bryce (2010). A.D., After Disclosure: The People's Guide to Life After Contact. Keyhole Publishing Company. ISBN 978-0-9677995-3-7.
- Swords, Michael D. (2012). UFOs and Government: A Historical Inquiry. Anomalist Books, LLC. ISBN 978-1-933665-58-0.
- Zabel, Bryce; Dolan, Richard M. (2014). Project Disclosure: Revealing Government Secrets and Breaking the Truth Embargo. The Rosen Publishing Group, Inc. ISBN 978-1-4777-8155-5.
- Coulthart, Ross (2021). In Plain Sight: An Investigation Into UFOs and Impossible Science. Sydney: HarperCollins. ISBN 978-1-4607-1276-4.
- Graff, Garrett M. (2023). UFO: the inside story of the US government's search for alien life here - and out there. New York: Avid Reader Press. ISBN 978-1-9821-9677-6.
- Elizondo, Luis (2024). Imminent: Inside the Pentagon's Hunt for UFOs. HarperCollins. ISBN 978-0-06-323558-8.
- Heckenlively, Kent; Mazzola, Michael (2025). Catastrophic Disclosure: The Deep State, Aliens, and the Truth. Simon and Schuster. ISBN 979-8-89565-119-3.
- Stratton, Jay (2026). Out of the Shadows: Revealing the Truth About Non-Human Intelligent Life. William Morrow. ISBN 978-0-06338-453-8.

=== Films & documentaries ===
- Unacknowledged, a 2017 documentary by Michael Mazzola.
- The Age of Disclosure, a 2025 American documentary that claims extraterrestrial intelligence is being covered up.
- Disclosure Day, a 2026 film about UFOs, directed by Steven Spielberg.

== See also ==
- UFO conspiracy theories, since the 1940s fringe sources have alleged coverups of alien spaceships
- United States UFO files, Collection of declassified United States government records concerning UFOs
