= Stephen Bassett (lobbyist) =

Political activist and lobbyist (born 1946)

- Born: 1946 (age 79–80)
- Education: Eckerd College
- Occupation: UFO lobbyist
- Years active: 1996-Present
- Organization: Paradigm Research Group
- Television: Paradigm Shift (2024)
- Movement: Disclosure movement

Stephen Bassett (born 1946) is an American political activist and lobbyist. As of 2021, he was the first and only person registered to lobby about UFOs in the United States.

In the 1990s, after working as a tennis pro and business consultant, Bassett became intrigued by ufology and devoted himself to lobbying the United States Congress about UFOs. Due to the skeptical reception he's received from elected officeholders, Bassett has focused on public relations tactics.

== Early life and education ==
Stephen Bassett was born into an itinerant military family. As a child, he was interested in science fiction. He studied at Georgia Tech and ultimately graduated from Eckerd College.

== Career ==
Following university, Bassett worked as a tennis pro and freelance business consultant.

=== UFO activism ===
In 1995, after reading John E. Mack's Abduction: Human Encounters with Aliens, Bassett became interested in ufology. After volunteering with Mack for a few months, he established the pro-disclosure organization Paradigm Research Group, initially based in the attic of his aunt's house.

In 1996, Bassett registered as the United States' first and only UFO lobbyist, a status he continues to hold as of 2021. In 1998 he was the campaign manager for Frances Emma Barwood, who unsuccessfully sought the Republican nomination for Arizona Secretary of State on a platform of UFO disclosure. Four years later, in 2002, Bassett unsuccessfully ran for Congress as an independent in Maryland's 8th congressional district.

External videos
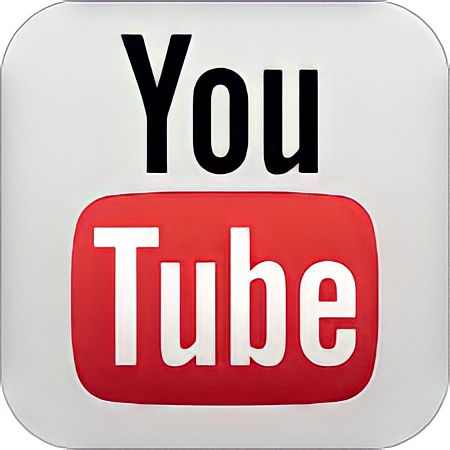
- Bassett speaking at the 2025 Conscious Life Expo in Los Angeles, California, United States
- (via YouTube)

As a lobbyist, Bassett was not warmly received in Washington. During his first three years of lobbying, Bassett said he was only able to meet with three members of Congress. Due to early resistance he faced in his work, Bassett has primarily focused on public relations tactics, speaking to journalists about UFOs and organizing publicity stunts such as a 2011 We the People petition for UFO disclosure, and a mock 2013 congressional hearing.

A regular speaker at UFO conferences, Bassett also appears frequently on Coast to Coast AM and has been quoted on the topic of UFOs by NBC News, WABC-AM, and other media outlets.

Bassett has predicted the U.S. Government is on the verge of disclosing the existence of purported secret information it has about UFOs on several occasions since 2003.

==== Film and television ====
In 2024, Bassett starred in a six-episode short series about UFOs on the UNIFYD TV streaming network, Paradigm Shift. He has also appeared in the documentary film Dan Aykroyd Unplugged on UFOs and other film and television productions.

== Personal life ==
Bassett is unmarried. In 2017 he moved to London, though later returned to the United States.

== Electoral history ==
Maryland's 8th congressional district (2002)
Party	Candidate	Votes	%	±%
Democratic	Chris Van Hollen	112,788	51.71	
Republican	Connie Morella	103,587	47.49	
Independent	Stephen Bassett	1,599	0.73	

== See also ==
- Disclosure movement
- Steven Greer
