= Secret space program =

Conspiracy theory alleging covert interplanetary military missions

The secret space program and 20 and back are conspiracy theories associated with ufology. They present that some people are recruited into secret military programs that involve a period of service — often 20 years — on planets other than Earth, after which they are returned to the point in time at which they were recruited, usually through application of some advanced time travel or age regression technology.

According to the Washington Spectator, the origins of the secret space program story "grew out of a 1970s spoof documentary televised in Britain called 'Alternative 3' meant as an April Fool’s joke ... but then grew into a worldwide mythmaking cult". It was popularized by Corey Goode — a popular personality in the disclosure movement — in the Gaia program Cosmic Disclosures, which he co-hosted with David Wilcock beginning in 2015. According to Goode, who is described by some UFO believers as a whistleblower and government insider, he was "age regressed" after many years fighting as a warrior with alien species as part of an interplanetary federation.

In 2017, the theme for the MUFON annual symposium was "The Case for a Secret Space Program", a decision criticized by some ufologists.

While persons other than Goode have claimed to be part of a secret space program, the terms "Secret Space Program" and "20 and Back" are trademarks owned by Goode.

== See also ==
- Above Majestic
- Shared world fiction
- UFO conspiracy theories
