= David Wilcock =

American paranormal writer (1973–2026)

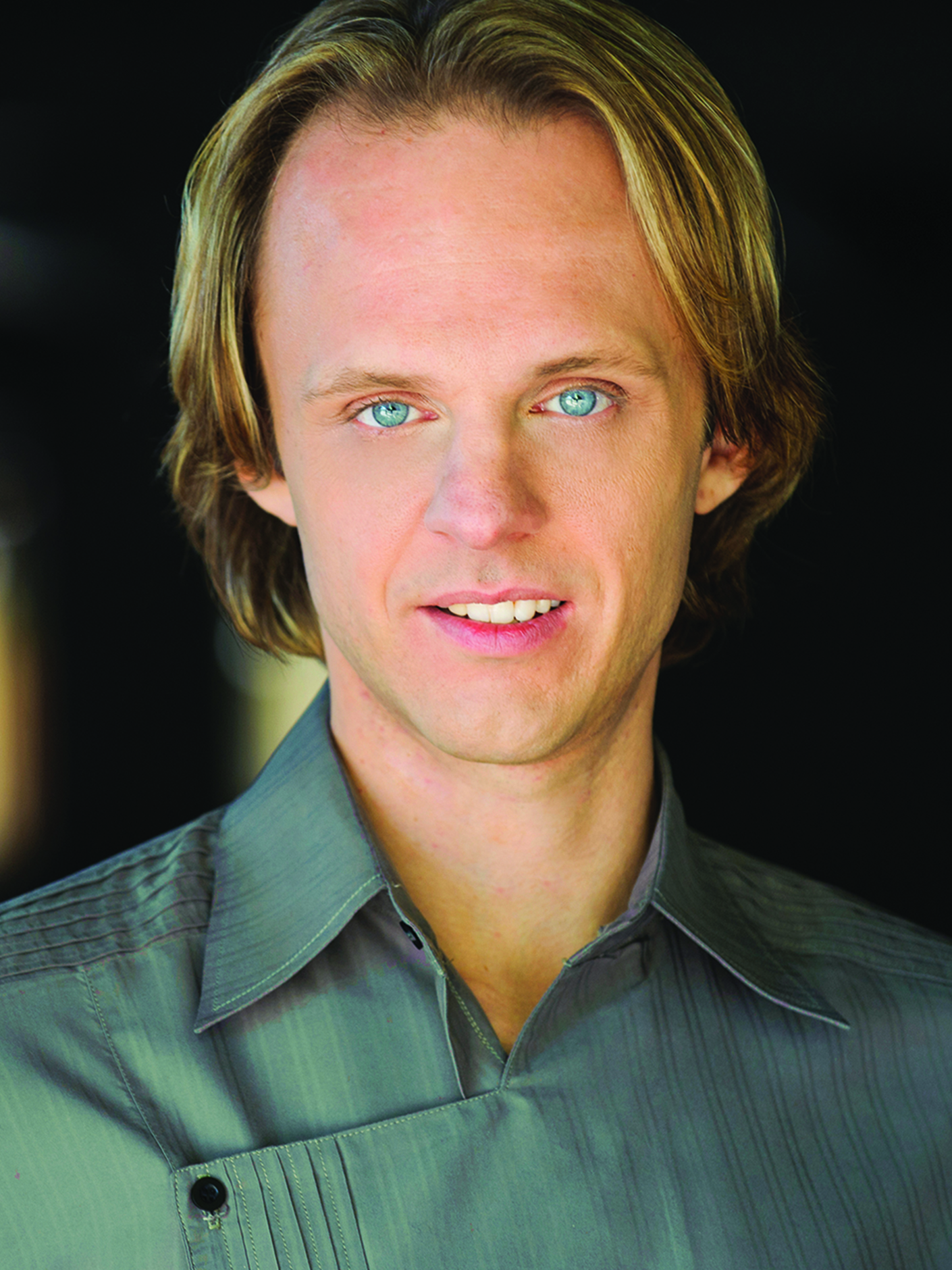
- Wilcock in 2009
- Born: March 8, 1973; Rotterdam, New York, U.S.
- Died: April 20, 2026 (aged 53); Nederland, Colorado, U.S.
- Occupations: Writer, media personality

YouTube information
- Channel: David Wilcock | Divine Cosmos
- Years active: 2010–2026
- Genre: Paranormal
- Subscribers: 550,000
- Views: 46.8 million
- Last updated: May 10, 2026
- Website: divinecosmos.com

David Wilcock (March 8, 1973 – April 20, 2026) was an American paranormal writer, media personality, and YouTuber. He was a significant figure in the disclosure movement and a regular contributor to pseudoscientific theories in popular culture media, appearing in productions made by Gaia and on Ancient Aliens.

Wilcock believed himself to be in telepathic contact with extraterrestrial beings and indirectly proffered this belief as a basis for his teachings. Some of his followers believe he was the reincarnation of Edgar Cayce. According to his website, Divine Cosmos, he offered teachings in "soul growth, ascension, and the evolution of consciousness."

== Early life and education ==
David Wilcock was born on March 8, 1973, in Rotterdam, New York. His father, Donald, was a journalist and the author of a biography of Buddy Guy. David graduated from the State University of New York at New Paltz in 1995, where he studied psychology. He unsuccessfully applied to graduate school at Naropa University. Following his graduation from SUNY New Paltz, Wilcock worked for several weeks at a psychiatric hospital, according to religious studies scholar David G. Robertson, who was quoting directly from Wilcock's book, The Reincarnation of Edgar Cayce? Interdimensional Communication and Global Transformation.

== Interest in the paranormal ==
Robertson reports that Wilcock's interest in the paranormal began in 1993 when he heard from someone who, in turn, heard from someone else, that it was "common knowledge at NASA that UFOs had been recovered from crash sites". He was later told by his girlfriend, Yumi, that a Shinto shaman said he would become a "famous spiritual leader", and a roommate had a dream in which Wilcock appeared as a "wanderer". (Note: The idea of "wanderers" is a theory described by writer Scott Mandelker that posits that space aliens reincarnate into human forms to work toward the spiritual development of Earth.) By the late 1990s, it had been suggested to Wilcock that he was the reincarnation of Edgar Cayce.

== Later career ==
Wilcock established himself as a significant figure in the disclosure movement, which advocates for the end of what it believes is United States Government secrecy about the existence of aliens and UFOs, and authored a number of books. In 2004, North Atlantic Books published Wilcock and Wynn Free's The Reincarnation of Edgar Cayce? which the publisher describes as presenting a theory that "Wilcock might indeed be [Edgar] Cayce's reincarnation" and in which Wilcock and Free go on to posit that humanity would soon undergo a transformation from matter to energy.

Wilcock sold $533 enrollments to his seven-week "Ascension Mystery School" which, he suggested, could prepare participants for salvation from the doom of a forthcoming alien invasion. He also solicited cash donations.

In 2012, E. P. Dutton published Wilcock's The Source Field Investigations: The Hidden Science and Lost Civilizations Behind the 2012 Prophecies, which Kirkus Reviews described as chronicling his prediction that the year 2012 would be "the start of an epoch that may usher in a higher state of consciousness". According to publisher Penguin Random House, Wilcock's books Awakening in the Dream and The Ascension Mysteries were both New York Times bestsellers.

External videos
- Above Majestic (2018), official trailer
- video icon

From 2013 to 2018, Wilcock hosted a show on Gaia titled Wisdom Teachings. He, along with Corey Goode, co-hosted a program also on Gaia called Cosmic Disclosures from 2015 to 2018. Wilcock's 2018 documentary-style film Above Majestic, according to Vice, makes the case that "reptilian aliens occupy large swaths of Antarctica, are massing for an invasion, and control the world's governments and banks". A review of the film on Movieweb describes it as advancing the theory that the September 11 attacks were an "alien conspiracy cover up". The following year, Wilcock produced the documentary style film The Cosmic Secret, which Vice described as predicting an upcoming global catastrophe based on information Wilcock purported to have received via telepathic contact with space aliens.

From 2010 on, Wilcock hosted a YouTube channel that eventually garnered half a million followers. He regularly appeared on the History Channel program Ancient Aliens.

He had become the "director of advanced technology" of Stavatti Aerospace by 2023.

He maintained a website, Divine Cosmos, until his death in 2026 where his teachings and lectures could be found.

== Personal life and death ==
According to his family, Wilcock suffered a long period of depression and, in later life, encountered significant financial troubles. Wilcock moved to Colorado by 2017.

On April 18, 2026, Wilcock expressed doubt that he would live stream a planned YouTube video, stating that he "had some very intense stuff going on this weekend". He died at his residence on April 20, 2026, at the age of 53, from a self-inflicted gunshot wound. His death was witnessed by law enforcement officers who had responded to an earlier 911 call he placed. His family later issued a statement of remembrance, acknowledging that while there were concerns about misinformation in regards to his beliefs, he was yet engaged in an "eternal quest for clarity".

His death sparked a number of conspiracy theories relating to the disappearance and deaths of eleven scientists whose work specialized in nuclear and space programs and supposedly classified projects. One day before Wilcock's death, he commented on the disappearance of the scientists in his final live stream on April 19, which contributed to conspiracy theories about his own death.

The House Oversight Committee and the FBI announced that they would each investigate the fates of the scientists. Wilcock's death also sparked unsubstantiated rumors of foul play regarding the deaths of fellow researchers Erich von Däniken and Nick Pope, who died within months of each other, the former from old age and the latter from cancer.

== Bibliography ==
- The Reincarnation of Edgar Cayce?: Interdimensional Communication and Global Transformation with Wynn Free (2004)
- The Source Field Investigations: The Hidden Science and Lost Civilizations Behind the 2012 Prophecies (2011)
- The Synchronicity Key: The Hidden Intelligence Guiding the Universe and You (2013)
- The Ascension Mysteries: Revealing the Cosmic Battle Between Good and Evil (2016)
- Awakening in the Dream: Contact with the Divine (2020)
