= Yankee Blue =

Fictional program within the U.S. Air Force

- Part of Pentagon UFO disinformation campaign
- Date: 1950s–2023
- Location: United States Air Force
- Type: Internal hazing / loyalty test; disinformation ritual
- Outcome: Discontinued by DoD in 2023

Yankee Blue was the codename for a fake United States Air Force UFO program. It was purported to involve the reverse-engineering of alien spacecraft, but was in fact an elaborate hazing and misinformation campaign, possibly part of a broader Pentagon disinformation program intended to obscure classified weapons development under the guise of UFO mythology. The ritual persisted from the Cold War era until its formal discontinuation in 2023.

In June 2025, The Wall Street Journal reported that the Pentagon's All‑domain Anomaly Resolution Office (AARO), then led by Sean Kirkpatrick, had discovered that for decades personnel in classified Air Force units had been shown images of flying saucers and told that they were from a top-secret alien‑technology recovery program called "Yankee Blue". The incoming members were shown "UFO" photos and told they'd be helping reverse-engineer alien tech. However, it was a fictional program. Participants were bound by non‑disclosure agreements and sometimes threatened with execution if they leaked information. The strategy most likely originated as a security measure to protect sensitive programs from Soviet intelligence and to divert attention from advanced weapons like stealth aircraft. Most participants believed the program to be real, even after retirement. AARO's internal review discovered that the ritual continued for decades but was put to a halt by a memo from the Secretary of Defense in spring 2023.

The Defense Department (DoD) acknowledged "pranks" as described by AARO in 2025. DoD spokeswoman, Sue Gough, explained that the department had not included the information in its 2024 UFO Report because the investigation was not completed at that time. Gough expected the information to be included in a forthcoming report scheduled for late 2025. “The department is committed to releasing a second volume of its Historical Record Report, to include AARO’s findings on reports of potential pranks and inauthentic materials,” Gough said.

== See also ==
- All-domain Anomaly Resolution Office
- Immaculate Constellation
- Unidentified anomalous phenomenon
