= Paul Bennewitz =

American UFO researcher (1927–2003)

- Bennewitz in front of an airplane
- Born: September 29, 1927
- Died: June 23, 2003 (aged 75)
- Occupations: Engineer, businessman
- Known for: UFO conspiracy theories including Dulce Base

Paul Frederic Bennewitz Jr. (September 29, 1927 – June 23, 2003) was an American businessman and UFO investigator. Bennewitz believed he had intercepted communications from alien spacecraft and discovered a secret underground facility called Dulce Base managed by aliens in cooperation with the US government. His claims appeared in the popular press in the early 1980s.

According to some sources, Bennewitz was the target of a government disinformation campaign that ultimately led to his psychiatric hospitalization. Author Greg Valdez proposes that Bennewitz was targeted for his investigation of cattle mutilations. Valdez argues the mutilations were a government testing program looking at the after-effects of radiation from 1967's Project Gasbuggy, in which an underground atomic device was detonated just 21 mi (34 km) southwest of Dulce: "They were testing the cattle to avoid panicking the public".

== Career ==
Bennewitz, the son of Stella A. Sharp and Paul Frederic Bennewitz Sr. (1900–1949), was a native of Kansas.

He earned a PhD in physics.

During World War II, Bennewitz was a radio electronics engineer for the Coast Guard. He worked as an engineer for San Francisco CBS station KPIX, and KPHO in Tucson.

On February 25, 1949, Bennewitz married Cindy Bunch in Phoenix, Arizona.

Around 1953, Bennewitz moved to New Mexico and started working for Gulton Industries, doing sales; Bennewitz later began his own industrial sales company. In 1966, Bennewitz acquired the rights to a humidity sensor from Sandia National Laboratories. He founded Thunder Scientific, a small family business, with wife Cindy serving as bookkeeper.

In April 1981, Bennewitz was profiled in the Albuquerque Tribune about his company, Thunder Scientific. The paper reported that Thunder did about $1 million in sales, but profits had waned over recent years; in 1978, Thunder employed 30 people, but by 1981, that number had dropped to only 18 employees.

== UFO conspiracy theories ==
Richard C. Doty and John Lear and have been described as the most influential UFO figures of the 1980s. Doty recruited Bill Moore and the two served as informants for Paul Bennewitz. Doty similarly supplied information to journalist Linda Moulton Howe and later collaborated with author Whitley Strieber. Meanwhile, John Lear served as informant to Bill Cooper, who in turn influenced the militia movement in general and Oklahoma City bomber Timothy McVeigh in particular. Lear granted interviews to journalist George Knapp, later introducing Bob Lazar to UFO conspiracy theories and later introducing him to Knapp. Lear also collaborated with Phil Schneider. Additionally, unconfirmed speculation holds that Doty and Lear interacted.

During the 1970s, Bennewitz became a member of Arizona's Aerial Phenomena Research Organization (APRO), a civilian UFO investigation group. By the mid-1970s, cattle mutilations had become associated with UFOs. On April 20, 1979, U.S. Attorney R. E. Thompson and US Senator Harrison Schmidt held a public meeting about cattle mutilations. The meeting was attended by about 80, one attendee was Paul Bennewitz.

The 2013 documentary Mirage Men includes the suggestion that government agents likely "first identified" Bennewitz at this meeting or outright targeted him for his participation. At the meeting, Bennewitz was introduced to highway patrol officer Gabe Valdez who was investigating the incidents.

Bennewitz later listed July 1979 as the beginning of a "personally funded study" into UFOs. Bennewitz reportedly began filming strange lights and recording unusual radio signals over Kirtland Air Force Base.

=== Meeting with 'Myrna Hansen' ===
On May 6, 1980, State Police in Cimarron, New Mexico received a report from a woman calling herself "Myrna Hansen" (not to be confused with the movie star of the same name) describing a story involving interplanetary visitors, bright lights, and herds of cattle. Police in Cimarron referred the case to their colleague in Dulce, Gabe Valdez, who they knew to be "the cattle mutilation guy" for his interest in the cases. Valdez, in turn, contacted Paul Bennewitz.

On May 7, 1980, Hansen and her son traveled to Albuquerque to meet with Bennewitz, staying in his home. Hansen explained to Bennewitz that on May 5, 1980, while she was driving with her son near Eagle Nest, New Mexico they had witnessed two large, silent objects approximately the size of Goodyear Blimps hovering over a meadow.

APRO director James Lorenzen learned of the Hansen case and suggested Bennewitz contact Leo Sprinkle, a psychologist and tenured professor at the University of Wyoming who had been investigating "UFO contact" reports. Bennewitz arranged for Sprinkle to fly to Albuquerque to hypnotize Hansen. When Sprinkle arrived, Hansen and Bennewitz insisted the sessions be conducted in Bennewitz's Lincoln Town Car, parked inside the family garage, with the car's windows covered with thick aluminum foil. During her first regression, she reported a recollection of a cow being sucked into a hovering spaceship by a tractor beam.

On May 11 and 12, 1980, under hypnosis, Hansen reported recollections of an abduction and of being taken to an underground base with body parts floating in vats. Hansen's recollections would later evolve into the legend of Dulce Base. During the session, she exclaimed "Where's Roswell, New Mexico?", although most members of the public had not yet connected the town to UFO folklore. Hansen reported recalling having been given an 'implant' by the aliens.

On June 3, Sprinkle returned to visit Bennewitz, he found Bennewitz armed with pistol and rifle, concerned that he was vulnerable to attacks from aliens. Bennewitz expressed a desire to protect himself, his family, and Hansen.

Bennewitz then turned to hypnotist James Harder, abduction researcher and a professor of Engineering. Harder had conducted a hypnotic regression of Travis Walton in 1975. The two believed Hansen was under the influence of alien beams and wrote detailed instructions on how to use aluminum foil to 'shield' a room from the beams before conducting a regression.

Gabriel Valdez's son later commented on the Myrna Hanson story as follows.

It is a possibility that the Myrna Hansen story was also part of the disinformation campaign... I will go out on a limb here and say that the story of Myrna Hansen was probably a well-orchestrated hoax because of a very important fact: the listening devices found in my dad’s house. The government heard all the conversations on the phone between my dad and [Bennewitz], so such a hoax would be relatively easy to accomplish... Myrna Hansen came into the picture in May of 1980 and the Air Force did not even acknowledge contact with Paul until November of 1980... Although this evidence can barely be viewed as even circumstantial, it would explain a lot of things and how and why they transpired during the 1980s based on what we currently know.

=== Relationship with US government ===
On October 24, 1980, Bennewitz contacted Kirtland Air Force base to report his findings. On November 10, 1980, Bennewitz briefed people at Kirtland.

=== "Dulce War" ===
In a December 2, 1981, letter to U.S. Senator Pete Domenici, Bennewitz explained that "sometime late 79 or first of 80 an argument insued [sic] over weapons and the military abandoned [Dulce base]; the final circumstance of the men unknown...". Wrote Bennewitz:

To date, as noted, I have not heard from you and therefore will assume with all your new duties that you are very busy and just have not had the time.
The facts I gave Captain Harris are simple and straightforward as follows:
1) I knew the location of the Alien bases in Northern New Mexico in the center of the Jicarilla Apache Reservation 4.5 miles northwest of Dulce, NM.
2) I know that someone in the military made a deal with the Aliens several years ago, giving the Indian land, cattle, etc. and apparent assurance of safety to the Alien in trade for Technology in the form of an Atomic powered ship at the same time establishing an extensive US base alongside to test the ship.
3) That sometime late 79 or first of 80 an argument insued [sic] over weapons and the military abandoned; the final circumstance of the men unknown.
4) That I had very high resolution official NASA U2 CIR (color infrared)photos in addition to low level and ground photos showing the base in total detail, (photos obtained legitimately through UNM) [University of New Mexico]
5) The ship design traded for is over thirty (30) years behind the alien technology.
6) I advised Captain Harris I knew of the two women and child near Austin, TX who were severely exposed to radiation at close distance from the ship in trouble and that it was seen to come west with helicopters (unmarked) and that the government was quietly paying their hospital expenses.
I am also very concerned that the President has not been totally advised of the situation and have forwarded a copy to him, cover letter enclosed for your record. It is hoped you will value this valuable input and in time get in touch with me.

In 1984, Bennewitz again referred to a 1979 conflict that led to the closure of the Alien-Human base. The "Dulce War" would later be espoused by conspiracy theorists like John Lear, Bill Cooper, and Phil Schneider.

=== Increasing publicity ===
Bennewitz later began contacting UFO researchers. On April 8, 1983, Bennewitz was discussed in a UPI wire story about his supposed 1980 filming of UFOs over the Manzano Weapons Storage facility. He also reported being in communication with aliens via his computer.

In 1984, Bennewitz's relationship with the government was detailed in UFO conspiracy book Clear Intent: the government coverup of the UFO experience.

The story spread rapidly within the UFO community and by 1987, UFOlogist John Lear claimed he had independent confirmations of the base's existence.

In 1986, George Clinton Andrews discussed Dulce Base legends in his book Extra-Terrestrials Among Us. In 1988, the tabloid Weekly World News published a story entitled "UFO base found in New Mexico" which claimed that "diabolical invaders from another solar system have set up a secret underground base in the rugged mountains of northern New Mexico – so they can shanghai human guinea pigs for bizarre genetic experiments". The Weekly World News story used supposed quotes from UFOlogist Leonard Stringfield as a source for its claims. Upon learning of the story, Stringfield protested, "I never read such a distortion of facts in my life".

External documents
- "Project Beta" by Paul Bennewitz

In 1988, Paul Bennewitz wrote a paper titled "Project Beta" detailing how the base might be successfully attacked.

=== Beliefs ===
Bennewitz claimed the existence of a plot involving an extensive network of UFO bases tied to an alien colonization and control scheme to subjugate mankind. After he saw the hypnosis sessions of Myrna Hansen, who claimed to have UFO experiences, he became convinced that cattle mutilations were due to aliens. As a result, Bennewitz claimed to have uncovered evidence of aliens controlling humans through electromagnetic devices, and furthermore claimed that UFOs were regularly flying near Kirtland Air Force Base and the nearby Manzano Nuclear Weapons Storage Facility and Coyote Canyon Test Area.

Convinced that he was intercepting electronic communications originating from alien spacecraft located outside of Albuquerque, New Mexico, Bennewitz soon believed that he had located a secret alien facility that he called Dulce Base.

=== Hospitalization and disinformation revealed ===
External videos
- Bill Moore addresses MUFON, July 1 1989

By August 1988, Bennewitz was accusing his wife of being in control of the extraterrestrials. After attempting to barricade himself in his home using sandbags, his family admitted him to the mental health unit of Presbyterian Anna Kaseman Hospital. He remained under observation there for one month.

On October 14, 1988, the television broadcast UFO Cover Up? Live introduced the stories of Majestic 12 and Area 51 to the American public. On July 1, 1989, William Moore claimed that he tried to push Bennewitz into a mental breakdown by feeding him false information about aliens. This was corroborated in a 1992 Monroe Institute article that can be found in the CIA library that claims Moore and another officer of the Air Force Office of Special Investigations, Richard Doty, are responsible for a disinformation campaign against Bennewitz.

In 1990, the Bennewitz story was featured in Howard Blum's book Out There: The Government's Secret Quest for Extraterrestrials. Blum publicized that the government had sent undercover agents to befriend and mislead Bennewitz using counterfeit documents.

== Death and legacy ==
In 1999, the Albuquerque Tribune anniversary page featured mention of Paul and Cindy's 50th anniversary.

Paul Bennewitz died on June 23, 2003. He was buried at Santa Fe National Cemetery.

In 2005, the book Project Beta: The Story of Paul Bennewitz, National Security, and the Creation of a Modern UFO Myth by Greg Bishop further publicized the events. Mark Pilkington's book about the project, also called Mirage Men, was published in 2010 by Constable & Robinson. The book was adapted into the 2013 documentary Mirage Men.

Former special agent for the U.S. Air Force Office of Special Investigations Richard C. Doty claimed that in the 1980s he was tasked with hoaxing documents and feeding false information to UFO researchers, including Bennewitz.

== See also ==
- Richard Shaver
- Morris K. Jessup
- Bill Cooper
- Gabe Valdez
