= Strange Harvest =

Strange Harvest may refer to:

- Strange Harvest (film), a 2024 horror mockumentary by Stuart Ortiz
- Strange Harvest, a 2015 album by The Tempers
- A Strange Harvest, a 1980 television documentary by Linda Moulton Howe
- Strange Harvest (book), a 1965 collection of stories by Donald Wandrei
- Strange Harvest, a 1986 novel by Kyle Onstott and Ashley Carter
