= Gabe Valdez =

New Mexico State Police officer

Officer Gabe Valdez in State Police uniform.

Gabriel L. "Gabe" Valdez (c. 1944 — August 7, 2011) was a long-time New Mexico State Police officer and New Mexico Gaming Control Board investigator. Valdez is most remembered for leading the criminal investigation into unsolved livestock mutilations in 1970s New Mexico.

== Early life ==
Valdez was born to a family of ranchers south of Tierra Amarilla. Valdez would later recall "We had about 30 head of cattle. My dad would sell steers in the fall. We always had plenty of meat. Not many vegetables but plenty of meat." In 1964, as a high school senior, Valdez was listed on the Tierra Amarilla school's honor roll.

Valdez worked for the Roads Department of the Bureau of Indian Affairs.

== Law enforcement career ==
In July and August 1969, media listed Valdez as City Marshal of Chama, New Mexico. In 1969, Valdez joined the New Mexico State Police. After brief stints in Espanola and Chimayo, Valdez was transferred to Dulce.

In 1973, racer Bobby Unser publicly thanked Valdez and others who had helped fight flooding at his northern New Mexico ranch. In 1984, Valdez was featured in local papers after being part of a rescue party sent to help snowed-in hunters. That same year, he was featured when he recovered $19,000 in cash and a white powder suspected to be cocaine from a small plane crash. In 1988, Valdez was discussed in connection with a standoff with a resident who refused to vacate.

In 1990, Valdez requested, and received, a transfer from Dulce to Albuquerque in order to facilitate his sons attending university there. Around 1992, Valdez retired from the State Police, later taking an investigator position with New Mexico Gaming Control Board.

=== Investigation of cattle mutilations ===
On June 16, 1976, Valdez was interviewed by local media after investigating a mutilation discovered by rancher Manuel Gomez. Valdez reported that a mysterious three-legged aircraft had landed twice, scorching grass.

In 1978, Valdez was photographed by local media during an investigation of four mutilated cattle.

On April 20, 1979, U.S. Attorney R. E. Thompson and US Senator Harrison Schmidt held a public meeting about cattle mutilations. The meeting was attended by about 80—one attendee was Paul Bennewitz, who approached Valdez and reported having seen unidentified lights over Kirtland Air Force Base.

On May 2, 1979, Valdez told press that two drugs had been found in the remains of a mutilated bull found in Torrance County on February 15. Valdez reported one drug, Chlorpromazine (Thorazine), was used to tranquilize and immobilize the animal, while a second, unnamed drug was used to "clog the blood and remove it through the jugular vein." Valdez told papers "We know this stuff is made here, and it isn't from outer space. Whoever is doing it is highly sophisticated, and they have a lot of resources. They're well organized". Valdez was described as "the state's chief information source on mutilations, having worked on 32 cases... in about three years".

In 1982, Valdez was mentioned in connection with helicopter sightings near cattle mutilations.

In 1996, Valdez joined Robert Bigelow's "National Institute of Discovery Science", a self-described paranormal research group.

== Death and legacy ==
External videos
- KRQE News on Gabe Valdez in 2014.

Valdez died in 2011.

In 2010, the book Mirage Men detailed the operation against Valdez and Bennewitz. The 2013 documentary film adaptation, also called Mirage Men, featured footage of Valdez.

In 2014, Gabe's son Greg Valdez authored Dulce Base: The Truth and Evidence from the Case Files of Gabe Valdez based on his father's files. Greg Valdez reports his father never believed aliens were involved: "People want to come and find aliens, but there is no proof of aliens and my father never believed there was alien activity. He pointed toward the government." Greg Valdez concludes that mutilations were a government testing program looking at the after-effects of radiation from 1967 Project Gasbuggy, in which an underground atomic device was detonated just 21 mi (34 km) southwest of Dulce: "They were testing the cattle to avoid panicking the public".
