= Cattle mutilation =

Killing and mutilation of cattle under unusual and anomalous circumstances

Cattle mutilation is the killing and mutilation of cattle under supposedly unusual, usually bloodless circumstances. Reportedly removed parts often include an ear, eyeball, jaw flesh, tongue, lymph nodes, genitals and rectum. Reports began in the late 1960s and continued into the 1980s. In that era, mutilations were the subject of multiple independent investigations in the United States.

Many so-called mutilations are explainable as natural decomposition and normal predation. Multiple lines of evidence suggest some of the deaths might have been the result of an organized effort. Meanwhile, conspiracy theorists suggest cults, aliens, or cryptids (such as the chupacabra) were responsible.

== Early history ==
The earliest known documented outbreak of unexplained livestock deaths occurred in early 1606 "...about the city of London and some of the shires adjoining. Whole slaughters of sheep have been made, in some places to number 100, in others less, where nothing is taken from the sheep but their tallow and some inward parts, the whole carcasses, and fleece remaining still behind. "Of this sundry conjectures, but most agree that it tendeth towards some fireworks." The outbreak was noted in the official records of the Court of James I of England. Charles Fort collected many accounts of cattle mutilations that occurred in England in the late 19th and early 20th centuries.

=== The "Snippy" horse death of 1967 ===
Photograph of Snippy after death showing reportedly-"clean" cuts

Unexplained livestock deaths were relatively unknown until 1967, when the Pueblo Chieftain published a story about a horse called "Snippy" that was mysteriously found mutilated in Alamosa, Colorado.

On September 9, 1967, Agnes King and her son Harry reportedly found the dead body of their three-year-old horse. The horse's head and neck had been skinned and defleshed, and the body displayed cuts that, to King, looked very precise. No blood was at the scene, according to Harry, and a strong medicinal odor was in the air.

The story was republished by the wider press and distributed nationwide; this case was the first to feature speculation that extraterrestrial beings and unidentified flying objects were associated with mutilation. A subsequent investigation by Wadsworth Ayer for the Condon Committee concluded that "There was no evidence to support the assertion that the horse's death was associated in any way to abnormal causes".

Alamosa County Sheriff Ben Phillips suggested that the death was probably due to "a lightning strike" and never bothered to visit the site. Early press coverage of the case misnamed Lady as Snippy. Snippy was Lady's sire and belonged to Nellie's husband, Berle Lewis. Later press coverage mentions that the horse had been shot "in the rump". However, two students from Alamosa State College confessed to sneaking out into the pasture and shooting the horse several weeks after the case was publicized.

== Cattle mutilations 1973–1980 ==
Waves of cattle mutilations were reported in Kansas, Nebraska, Colorado, and New Mexico.

In April 1973, sheriffs in Western Iowa reported unidentified helicopters involved in cattle and pig rustling. In August, similar rustling was reported in Missouri and authorities warned farmers not to fire on helicopters.

=== 1973 Kansas events ===
On June 10, 1973, Cloud County sheriff Fred Modlin warned the public about a series of telephone calls from a caller identifying as a USDA official conducting a survey of herd population and locations. After the USDA denied such a survey, Modlin advised that the calls might be coming from rustlers.

On June 14, a 700-pound heifer was found butchered on the Ray Vizner farm near Munden, Kansas. Its right ear had reportedly been removed and right rear quarter butchered; Republic County sheriff Bob Blecha argued the death was not the work of predators. Two weeks later, on June 28, a second butchered cow was found on the Lowell Darcy farm, twenty miles away from the first butchered cow; Like the first, its right ear was removed. Local press initially speculated about a 'Mad Dog' or 'phantom' Butcher. On August 9, a third butchered cow was found, this one in South County. On August 30, a fourth butchered cow was reported, this one on the Larry LeBlanc farm south of St. Joseph in Cloud County; the right ear was again removed.

On October 25, three cows in Harvey County were discovered with their sex organs removed. On November 15, press reported a slain cow on the Don Peter farm near Munden, the seventh animal death attributed to the "butcher". The November 22 issue of the Belleville Telescope again referenced the "Mad Dog Cattle Butcher".

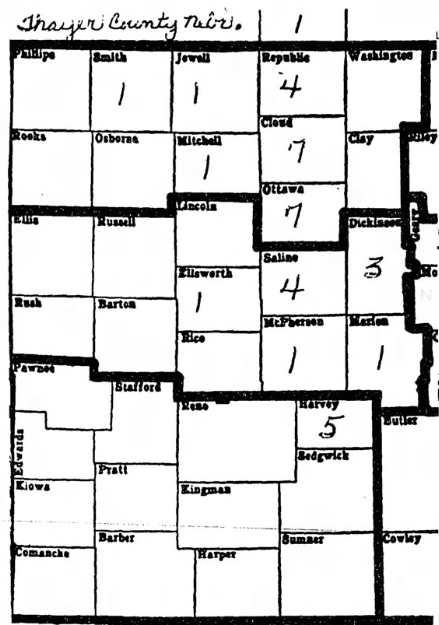
Cattle mutilations by county in Kansas and Nebraska, as of December 13, 1973

On December 4, 1973, law enforcement including Modlin reported a wave of cattle deaths in seven counties across Kansas and Nebraska. Sexual organs were reported having been removed. An upcoming meeting on the mutilations was announced. On December 6, a killing on the Lavern Hiner farm in Cloud County was reported to be the butcher's ninth. By December 13, Kansas law enforcement reported having investigated total 40 mutilations, most occurring on land near US Highway 81. On December 20, State Senator Ross Doyen reported a cattle mutilation on his ranch.

On December 22, the Kansas Brand Commissioner's office determined that most of the deaths and removal of sex organs were the result of natural causes including predation, "shipping fever" and blackleg. Modlin and others vocally disagreed with these conclusion and denied that local ranchers would mutilate dead animals for insurance money, calling them "honest and respectable".

=== 1973–1974 Minnesota and South Dakota events ===
On October 2, 1974, South Dakota Attorney General Kermit Sande told press that a number of mutilations had been reported in the state. Mutilations had been reported in three counties, and a psychiatrist argued the person responsible might be psychotic. After five mutilations were reported in Day County, a $500 reward was offered.

On December 2, 1974, press reported on several Minnesota mutilations: two in Kandiyohi County, six in Swift County, and one in Meeker County. The Meeker animal was reportedly drained of blood. Between 1970 and 1974, twenty-two mutilated cattle were reported in Minnesota.

=== 1974 Nebraska events ===
Reports resumed in April 1974, when a Nebraska cow was discovered mutilated and drained of blood. That month, the North American Newspaper Alliance reported on the 1973 mutilations along with sightings of unidentified helicopters.

In May, two mutilations were reported in Mills County, Iowa; An AP story argued coyotes were responsible. By June 1974, mutilations were reported in Lancaster County, Nebraska. Custer Country reported similar helicopter sightings and armed patrols. On August 14, 1974, the Cascade County, Montana Sheriff's Office received its first report of a mutilated cow.

On August 20, press reported a "new twist" in the mutilations: Days prior, near Agnew, Nebraska, an unidentified helicopter had been spotted hovering 400 feet above where a mutilated cow would later be discovered. The helicopter was reported shining a spotlight into the field; FAA and National Guard reported no knowledge of helicopters operating in the area. Knox County Sheriff Herbert Thompson reported that armed civilians had begun patrols in response to repeated helicopter sightings. Cloud County Attorney William Walsh told press of a jailhouse informant who claimed to be a former cult member and opined the mutilations were likely the result of devil-worshiping cultists. The Kansas Bureau of Investigation and the Kansas Brand Inspectors were reported to lean toward predators as the cause. Amid the cattle mutilation jitters and drought, Oakland, Nebraska experienced as spate of "beast" sightings as residents feared an unidentified noisy night-time animal. State Sen. John Decamp called on authorities to coordinate an investigation into the mutilations. As of August 28, there had been 25 mutilations reported across five Nebraska counties.

On August 28, press reported that a rancher near Hartington had apparently thwarted a mutilation in progress when he found a helicopter above his field that was spotted by a neighbor who summoned the sheriff; All three reportedly witnessed the helicopter as well as a car that was seen shining a spotlight into the field. The following morning, a dead cow was found near where the helicopter had been spotted, but the cow had not been mutilated. Authorities cautioned the public not to shoot at aircraft. On September 5, it was reported that authorities had ordered helicopters to fly above 1000 feet after a commercial helicopter took two bullets during a power line inspection.

On September 11, a supposedly-mutilated cow was revealed at autopsy to have died of natural causes, i.e. bacterial infection. It was the third such mutilation disproved by authorities as the University of Nebraska's Department of Veterinary Science. On September 17, over 50 law enforcement officials from 24 counties attended a meeting at the Knox County Courthouse in Center, Nebraska to discuss the mutilations. Participants, who dismissed the cult theory, estimated that out of 80 cow deaths under discussion, about 27 were suspected mutilations.

On September 19, press reported three cases of alleged mutilations in South Dakota: Two in Moody County and one in Lake County. On the advice of the Sheriff, patrols were organized and farmers were instructed to check their herds every 12 hours. On September 30, papers reported on an unusual cow death where the animal was shot with a firearm, incised, and set aflame with fuel oil. Unlike other cases, removed body parts were left on site and no parts of the animal were taken.

In the September 30, 1974 issue of Newsweek, the magazine became the first national outlet to cover the ongoing mutilation story; Its story reported 100 cattle mutilated in Nebraska, Kansas, and Iowa since May.

It was reported that UFO conspiracy theorists considered cattle mutilations might be related to flying saucers; On November 15, UFO expert J. Allen Hynek released a statement denying any link.

=== 1975 Colorado events ===
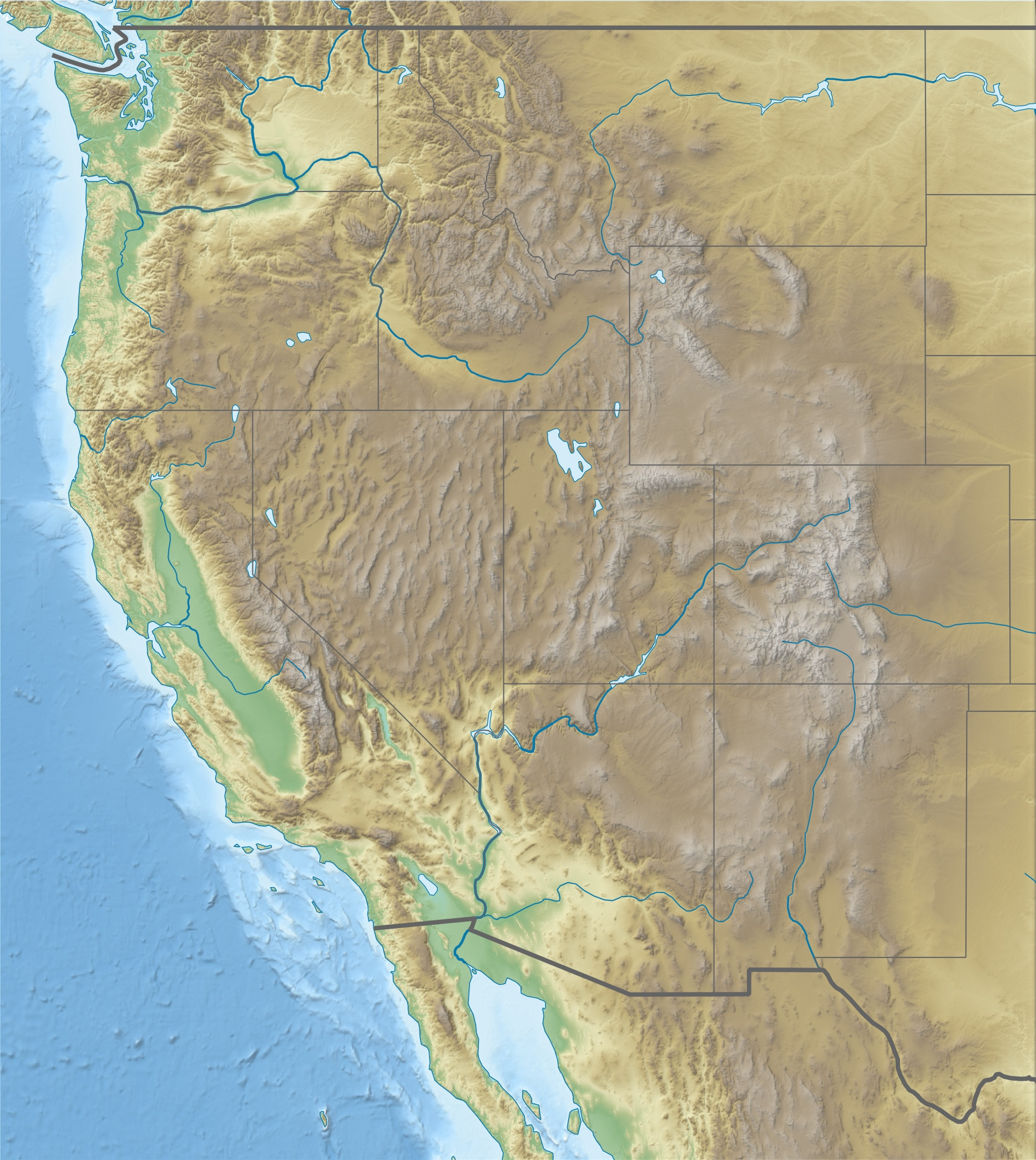
The Snippy case occurred on the Harry King Ranch, located in Colorado's San Luis Valley near Alamosa.

In 1975, the Colorado Associated Press voted the mutilations as the state's top story. Senator Floyd K. Haskell contacted the FBI asking for help in 1975 due to public concern regarding the issue. He claimed there had been 130 mutilations in Colorado alone, and further reports across nine states. A 1979 FBI report indicated that, according to investigations by the New Mexico State Police, there had been an estimated 8,000 mutilations in Colorado, causing approximately $1 million in damages.

In January 1975, the Michigan ATF tasked Donald E. Flickinger with investigating the mutilations; Flickinger investigated possible links to a "Hell-oriented biker gang". In May 1975, the Colorado Bureau of Investigation opened an investigation under the leadership of Carl Whiteside.

In October 1975, The New York Times published a story examining cattle mutilations across 11 states.

=== 1976 Dulce, New Mexico, events ===
On June 13, 1976, Dulce rancher Manuel Gomez reported six mutilations to Officer Gabe Valdez of the New Mexico State Patrol. The cattle were injured in ways that were described as surgical. While some authorities at the time argued that they were consistent with an animal attack, others pointed to the injuries as evidence of a human culprit. Investigations at the time noted circular dents in the ground near by that caused people to blame nuclear testing or UFOs.

=== 1979 public meeting ===
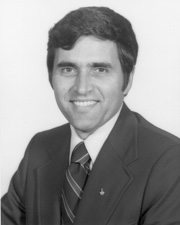
Harrison Schmitt, U.S. Senator

On April 20, 1979, U.S. Attorney R. E. Thompson and US Senator Harrison Schmidt held a public meeting about cattle mutilations. The meeting was attended by about 80 people. One attendee was Paul Bennewitz, who approached Valdez and reported having seen unidentified lights over Kirtland Air Force Base.

On May 2, 1979, Valdez told press that two drugs had been found in the remains of a mutilated bull found in Torrance County on February 15. Valdez reported one drug, Chlorpromazine (Thorazine), was used to tranquilize and immobilize the animal, while a second, unnamed drug was used to "clog the blood and remove it through the jugular vein." Valdez told papers "We know this stuff is made here, and it isn't from outer space. Whoever is doing it is highly sophisticated, and they have a lot of resources. They're well organized". Valdez was described as "the state's chief information source on mutilations, having worked on 32 cases... in about three years".

On June 14, 1981, investigators found a mutilated cow at the Gomez ranch with a large amount of radar chaff nearby.

== Later incidents ==
Many cases of mutilation have been reported worldwide since the 1967 Snippy incident, chiefly in the Americas and Australia. In South America, an estimated 3,500 incidents have occurred since 2002, when around 400 cases were reported. Mutilation investigators assert that a large number of cases are never reported to authorities, perhaps no more than one in ten.

In 1993, photographic evidence surfaced of a mutilated male human corpse that was found near the Guarapiranga reservoir of São Paulo, Brazil in 1988. The victim's identity was kept private. Theories ranged from a mundane criminal act of homicide, to more fantastical speculation alleging alien abduction due to perceived similarities with UFO-related animal mutilations. An autopsy report concluded the wounds occurred while the victim was still alive, and the associated pain resulted in cardiac arrest. However, another independent investigation later concluded that he died from natural causes.

== Characteristics ==
Cattle death due to natural causes are extremely common; In Minnesota, where mutilations first began, nearly 2 million head of cattle were lost during 1973. That year, ranchers began reporting dozens of unusual cattle deaths characterized by absence of sex organs, udders, tongues, anus, rectum, and sometimes ears or eyes.

Cuts were described as "clean" and "surgical". Some animals were reported to have been drained of blood but with no sign of blood in the immediate area or even around their wounds.

According to Howard Burgess, nearly 90 percent of mutilated cattle are between four and five years old.

In some cases, strange marks or imprints near the site have been found. In the famous "Snippy" case, there was an absolute absence of tracks in a 100 ft (30 m) radius of the carcass (even the horse's own tracks disappeared within 100 ft (30 m) of the body.) But within this radius, several small holes were found seemingly "punched" in the ground and two bushes were absolutely flattened. In Rio Arriba County, New Mexico, June 1976, a "trail of suction cup-like impressions" was found leading from a mutilated three-year-old cow. The indentations were in a tripod form, 4 inches (10 cm) in diameter, 28 inches (71 cm) apart, and disappeared 500 feet (150 m) from the dead cow. Similar incidents were reported in the area in 1978.

=== Laboratory reports ===
Laboratory reports carried out on some mutilated animals have shown unusually high or low levels of vitamins or minerals in tissue samples, and the presence of chemicals not normally found in animals. However, not all mutilated animals display these anomalies, and those that do have slightly different anomalies from one another. On account of the time between death and necropsy, and a lack of background information on specific cattle, investigators have often found it impossible to determine if these variations are connected to the animals' deaths or not.

In one case documented by New Mexico police and the FBI, an 11-month-old cross Hereford-Charolais bull, belonging to a Mr. Manuel Gomez of Dulce, New Mexico, was found mutilated on March 24, 1978. It displayed "classic" mutilation signs, including the removal of the rectum and sex organs with what appeared to be "a sharp and precise instrument" and its internal organs were found to be inconsistent with a normal case of death followed by predation.

Both the liver and the heart were white and mushy. Both organs had the texture and consistency of peanut butter

— Gabriel L Valdez, New Mexico Police

The animal's heart as well as bone and muscle samples were sent to the Los Alamos Scientific Laboratory for microscopic and bacteriological studies, while samples from the animal's liver were sent to two separate private laboratories.

Los Alamos detected the presence of naturally occurring Clostridium bacteria in the heart, but was unable to reach any conclusions because of the possibility that the bacteria represented postmortem contamination. No microscopic changes of pathological significance were found in the heart tissue.

Samples from the animal's liver were found to be completely devoid of copper and to contain 4 times the normal level of zinc, potassium and phosphorus. The scientists performing the analysis were unable to explain these anomalies.

Blood samples taken at the scene were reported to be "light pink in color" and "Did not clot after several days" while the animal's hide was found to be unusually brittle for a fresh death (the animal was estimated to have been dead for 5 hours) and the flesh underneath was found to be discolored.

None of the laboratories were able to report any firm conclusions on the cause of the blood or tissue damage. At the time, it was suggested that a burst of radiation may have been used to kill the animal, blowing apart its red blood cells in the process. This hypothesis was later discarded as subsequent reports from the Los Alamos Scientific Laboratory later confirmed the presence of anti-coagulants in samples taken from other cows mutilated in the region.

=== Helicopter sightings ===
On July 15, 1974, two unregistered helicopters, a white helicopter and a black twin-engine aircraft were reported to have opened fire on Robert Smith Jr. while he was driving his tractor on his farm in Honey Creek, Iowa. This attack followed a rash of alleged mutilations in the area and across the nearby border in Nebraska. In August 1974, state leaders called for an investigation.

On August 20, 1974, the Lincoln Journal Star reported that residents had seen unidentified helicopters shining spotlights into fields where mutilated cows were later found. Know County Sheriff Herbert Thompson claimed helicopter sightings had become a nightly occurrence, with both the FAA and the National Guard reportedly being unaware of any helicopter activity. However, both Thompson and the Nebraska State Patrol found no definite connection between the cattle deaths and the helicopter sightings.

New Mexico State police, tribal police and game wardens attempted to pursue the aircraft near Dulce, but found the mysterious craft would move whenever an officer radioed that he was close. Inferring that the craft's operator was eavesdropping on the radio, law enforcement switched to speaking only in Apache. The strategy worked, and they were able to surround the craft, which was forced to pass overhead of one of the officers. He reported hearing a quiet sound, like a lawn mower. By 1975, the problem was so prevalent, that some ranchers formed armed vigilante groups to patrol their fields at night. Authorities ran ads in Colorado urging ranchers to not shoot at their survey helicopters. The National Guard warned its helicopter pilots to fly at higher than normal altitude to avoid fire from "jittery farmers".

In 1976, two Cache County, Utah, police officers reportedly confronted several men in an unmarked U.S. Army helicopter at a small community airport in Cache County. The witnesses asserted that after this heated encounter, cattle mutilations in the region ceased for about five years. The story was first published in a 2002 report.

On April 8, 1979, three police officers in Dulce, New Mexico, reported a mysterious aircraft which resembled a U.S. military helicopter hovering around a site following a wave of alleged mutilation which claimed 16 cows. The reports of "helicopter" involvement have been used to explain why some cattle appear to have been "dropped" from considerable heights.

== Official investigations ==
The New Mexico Livestock Board sought assistance from the Los Alamos Scientific Laboratory. Colorado Bureau of Investigation agents went undercover to investigate. Oklahoma convened a task force.

After coming under increasing public pressure, Federal authorities launched a comprehensive investigation of the mutilation phenomenon.

=== Bureau of Alcohol, Tobacco and Firearms ===
In January 1975, the Minnesota field office of the Bureau of Alcohol, Tobacco and Firearms (ATF) launched their own investigation into the phenomenon, headed by Agent Donald Flickinger. Flickinger was tasked with investigating the possible connections between cults and the mutilation of cattle.

Flickinger recorded a number of "unusual" incidents and circumstantial evidence, but was unable to find sufficient evidence of cult involvement for the ATF to take further action. Media reports of the time reported his investigation was dropped when it was determined cattle deaths were not a prelude to a coordinated campaign against elected officials by cult members. During the investigation, Flickinger arranged for two prison informants to be transferred to less-secure facilities; both ultimately escaped, on separate occasions. Flickinger closed his investigation by Spring 1975.

=== Colorado Bureau of Investigation ===
In May 1975, the Colorado Bureau of Investigation opened an investigation under the leadership of Carl Whiteside. 19 animals underwent necropsies at Colorado State University but no conclusive results emerged. A $40,000 reward was offered. The US Bureau of Land Management was forced to ground all helicopters in Eastern Colorado. By December, the CBI had investigated 203 reports of cattle mutilations. The CBI investigation was closed after Colorado mutilation reports dwindled in Summer 1976.

=== New Mexico State Police ===
On June 13, 1976, the New Mexico State Police began an investigation, headed by Officer Gabe Valdez with the assistance of Cattle Inspector Jim Dyad and Officer Howard Johnston of the New Mexico Department of Game and Fish.

Valdez began investigating and solicited the assistance of retired Sandia National Laboratories scientist Howard Burgess. On the night of July 5, suspecting that cattle might be "marked" in a way detectable from the air at night, Burgess and Valdez screened the Gomez herd; five animals were found to have been marked with a chemical that fluoresced under ultraviolet light.

On June 14, 1981, intact radar chaff was found near a mutilated cow on the Gomez ranch.

This investigation reported finding evidence that some mutilated animals had been tranquilized and treated with an anti-coagulant prior to their mutilation. It also contended that alleged surgical techniques performed during mutilations had become "more professional" over time. However, officers in charge were unable to determine responsibility or motive.

=== Rommel investigation ===
Despite repeated requests from US Senator Haskell, the FBI declined to investigate, arguing there was no evidence of crossing state lines and thus no federal jurisdiction. In lieu of a federal investigation, a federally funded investigation was conducted under the direction of the New Mexico District Attorney's office.

Beginning in May 1979, an investigation was funded by a $44,170 grant (equivalent to $195,900 in 2025) from the Law Enforcement Assistance Administration, and was headed by recently retired FBI agent Kenneth Rommel. It had five key objectives:

1. To determine the reliability of the information on which the grant was based, which entailed gathering as much information as possible about the cases reported in New Mexico prior to May 1979
2. To determine the cause of as many mutilations as possible, especially those reported in New Mexico
3. To determine if livestock mutilations as described constitute a major law enforcement problem
4. If these mutilations do constitute a major law enforcement problem, to determine the scope of the problem and to offer recommendations on how to deal with it
5. If it is shown that the mutilation phenomenon is not a law enforcement problem, to recommend that no further law enforcement investigations be funded.

Rommel's final report, released in June 1980, was 297 pages long; in the report's introduction, Rommel stated: "According to some estimates, by 1979 10,000 head of cattle have been mysteriously mutilated". However, the report concluded that the mutilations were predominantly the result of natural predation, but that some cases contained anomalies that could not be accounted for by conventional wisdom. The FBI was unable to identify any individuals responsible for the mutilations. Details of the investigation are now available under the Freedom of Information Act. The released material includes correspondence from Rommel where he states that "most credible sources have attributed this damage to normal predator and scavenger activity".

New Mexico State patrolman Gabe Valdez, who by the time of the Rommel report had investigated dozens of mutilation cases, told investigator Christopher O'Brien that "during the six to eight months when Rommel was actively investigating the mutilations in New Mexico, the state (especially the northern tier) became suddenly quiet with very few (if any) true mutilations being reported to officials". Valdez was convinced that Rommel never was able to investigate a single genuine mutilation because the mutilators moved their operations to other parts of the west. Rommel (a former FBI bank robbery expert) was disgusted by dead necrotic cows and chose to let others do the actual investigations while he waited upwind in the car.

Western Canada, during this period, was especially hard hit. During the six to eight months of Rommel's investigation, RCMP investigator Corporal Lyn Lauber of the Calgary detachment (who was in charge of the Canadian mutilation probe) investigated numerous mutilation cases. When Rommel's final report was released to the public, Lauber answered an inquiry by investigator Tommy Bland: "I find it difficult to understand how Rommel could make a statement such as this, without ever having personally witnessed a [real] mutilation firsthand". He also stated that "I would like to see Rommel write off our confirmed cases as due to predators".

== Conventional explanations ==
As with most disputed phenomena, there are a number of potential explanations for the causes of cattle mutilations, ranging from death by natural causes to purposeful acts by unknown individuals.

On April 20, 1979, C Hibbs of the New Mexico State Veterinary diagnostics Laboratory spoke before a hearing chaired by Senator Harrison Schmitt. Hibbs testified that mutilation fell into three categories: Natural causes such as predators, deaths caused by pranksters or deviants, and animals mutilated with "sharp instruments".

=== Natural causes ===
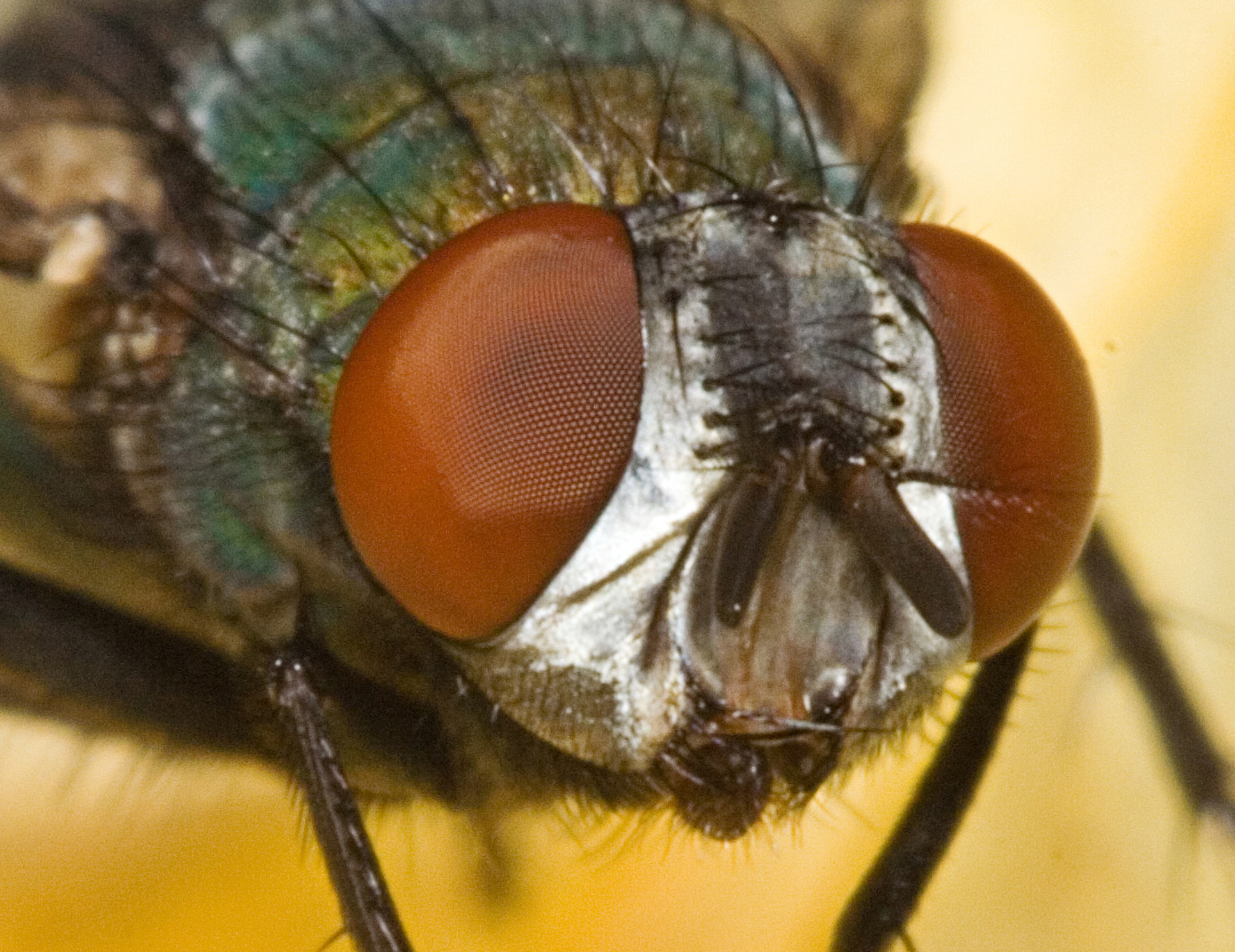
Blowflies have been implicated as possible scavengers involved in making livestock carcasses look "mutilated."

While many unconventional explanations have been put forward to explain cattle mutilations, a variety of scientists, veterinary workers, and knowledgeable observers (including farmers and other agricultural workers) have suggested more conventional ideas, most of which revolve around the hypothesis that "mutilated" animals died of natural causes and were subjected to known terrestrial phenomena – including the action of predators, parasites, and scavengers.

Missing or mutilated mouth, lips, anus, and genitalia are explained as:

- Contraction of missing/damaged areas due to dehydration.
- The actions of small scavengers and burrowing parasites seeking to enter or consume the body in areas where skin is at its thinnest.

Missing/mutilated eyes and soft internal organs are explained as:

- The action of carrion feeding insects such as blowflies, and opportunistic or carrion birds such as vultures, which are known to direct themselves toward an animal's eyes, and to enter the body through the openings of the mouth and anus in order to feed on soft internal organs.

Absence of blood is explained as:

- Blood pooling in the lowest points in the body where it will break down into its basic organic components.
- Blood that is external to the body, or in the area of a wound being consumed by insects or reduced by solar desiccation.

Surgical incisions in the skin are explained as:

- Tears in the skin created when it is stretched by postmortem bloat and/or as dehydration causes the animal's hide to shrink and split, often in linear cuts.
- Incisions caused by scavengers or predators, possibly exacerbated by the above.

The hypothesis that natural phenomena account for most mutilation characteristics has been validated by a number of experiments, including one cited by long-time scientific skeptic Robert T. Carroll, conducted by Washington County (Arkansas) Sheriff's Office. In the experiment, the body of a recently deceased cow was left in a field and observed for 48 hours. During the 48 hours, postmortem bloating was reported to have caused incision-like tears in the cow's skin that matched the "surgical" cuts reported on mutilated cows, while the action of blowflies and maggots reportedly matched the soft tissue damage observed on mutilated cows.

Experiments have also been conducted to compare the different reactions of surgically cut hide/flesh and predated hide/flesh to natural exposure. They demonstrated pronounced differences between surgical cuts and non surgical cuts over time.

Some ranchers have disputed the scientific "natural causes hypothesis" on the grounds that the mutilated animals often fall outside of the normal categories of natural deaths by predation or disease. One reason cited is that the animals were healthy and showed no sign of disease prior to death, and were large and strong enough not to be a likely target for a predator. In some cases, ranchers have reported that the mutilated cattle were among the healthiest and strongest animals in their herd.

=== Animal cruelty, pranks, and hoaxes ===
It is alternatively hypothesised that cattle mutilations are the result of two unrelated deviant phenomena. The bulk of mutilations are the result of predation and other natural processes, and those with anomalies that cannot be explained in this way are the work of humans who derive pleasure or sexual stimulation from mutilating animals. Lone individuals have attacked larger animals, including sheep, cows, and horses. Humans, particularly those with sociopathic disorders, have been found to have mutilated animals in elaborate ways using knives or surgical instruments.

=== Covert monitoring of threats to public health ===
In 1997, cattle mutilation researcher Charles T. Oliphant speculated the killings might be the result of covert research into emerging cattle diseases, and the possibility they could be transmitted to humans.

Biochemist Colm Kelleher, who has investigated several purported mutilations first-hand, argues that the mutilations are most likely a clandestine U.S. government effort to track the spread of bovine spongiform encephalopathy ("mad cow disease") and related diseases, such as scrapie. Kelleher argues there was an "uncanny resemblance between the pattern of organ removals that were taking place in cattle mutilations and standard wildlife sampling techniques for monitoring the spread of infectious agents in the wild." Kelleher furthered noted that infectious disease experts had a history of using helicopters to conduct surveys, euthanizing animals with sedatives before removing organs, and applying formaldehyde to the carcasses of animals to prevent consumption by scavengers; mutilated cattle were found to have traces of sedatives and formaldehyde, and their carcasses were avoided by scavengers.

In 2014, Gabe's son Greg Valdez authored Dulce Base: The Truth and Evidence from the Case Files of Gabe Valdez based on his father's files. Greg Valdez reports his father never believed aliens were involved: "People want to come and find aliens, but there is no proof of aliens and my father never believed there was alien activity. He pointed toward the government." Greg Valdez concludes that mutilations were a government testing program looking at the after-effects of radiation from 1967's Project Gasbuggy, in which an underground atomic device was detonated just 21 mi (34 km) southwest of Dulce: "They were testing the cattle to avoid panicking the public".

=== Secret weapons testing ===
Edwards reported his theory that the government was testing cattle parts to develop biological weapons to use in Vietnam, going so far as to write to Colorado Senator Floyd K. Haskell during Haskell's investigation to accuse agents of threatening him into silence.

In October, Edwards gave an interview to the Gazette (Colorado Springs Gazette Telegraph), announcing a theory that a government project was behind the mutilations. He expressed frustration that the FBI would not get involved and said he would be writing a book explaining "how the project was conceived". Shortly after, he was fired by the Gazette and then disappeared. On December 5, 1975, Edwards' wife reported him as a missing person. Edwards reemerged in the 1990s. He had adopted a new name, Dr. David Ellsworth, and founded an English-language instruction program that was adopted by many federal universities in Mexico.

Proponents of the weapons test hypothesis point to the fact that in March 1968, 6,000 sheep were killed as part of chemical weapons testing; the Army denied responsibility until 1998.

== Other explanations ==
Fringe explanations for the mutilation have blamed satanic cults, aliens, or even mythical monsters. Historian Michael J. Goleman has argued that ranchers' conflicts with the federal government fueled nefarious explanations.

=== Satanic cults ===
Closely related to the deviant hypothesis is the hypothesis that cattle mutilations are the result of cult activity. However, contrary to the deviancy hypothesis, which holds that cattle are mutilated at random by individual deviants, the cult hypothesis holds that cattle mutilations are coordinated acts of ritual sacrifice carried out by organized groups.

In July 1975, reporter Dane Edwards of the Brush Banner published a cattle mutilation story and began investigating a theory that a cult was responsible. When the origin of the cult theory was traced to a federal inmate and no cult members were ever identified, ranchers and law enforcement started looking for other explanations.

Beliefs held by proponents of the cult hypothesis vary, but may include:

- That the apparent absence of blood at mutilation sites may indicate cult members would harvest it
- That organs have been removed from cattle for use in rituals
- That unborn calves have been harvested from mutilated cattle.

The hypothesis that cults were responsible for cattle mutilation was developed in the U.S. during the 1970s and 1980s, a time of growing national concern over cults (such as the Peoples Temple and Jonestown) and ritual satanic abuse ("Satanic panic").

However, there were various reports during the time of menacing groups prowling around mutilation sites. In September 1975, a forestry service employee in Blaine County, Idaho, reported seeing a group of people in black hooded robes. Several cattle were found mutilated in the area the following day. On October 9, 1975, a motorist on U.S. Highway 95 in northern Idaho, in an area of frequent cattle mutilation, reported to police that some 15 masked individuals formed a roadblock with linked arms, forcing him to turn around.

Since the beginning of the cult hypothesis, law enforcement agents in several states and provinces, including Alberta, Idaho, Montana, and Iowa have reported evidence implicating cults in several instances of cattle mutilations.

During their investigations, the FBI and the ATF were unable to find appropriate evidence, including signs of consistency between mutilations, to substantiate that the animals had been the victims of any form of ritual sacrifice or organized mutilation effort. They were also unable to determine how or why a cult would perform procedures that would result in the anomalies reported in some necropsies, or to verify that the anomalies were 1) connected to the mutilations themselves 2) the result of human intervention.

In most cases, mutilations were either ruled due to natural causes, or the cattle were too far decayed for any useful conclusions to be drawn. Some cases of cult hysteria were traced back to fabrication by individuals unrelated to the incident. In one case it was concluded that claims had been falsified by a convict seeking favorable terms on his sentence in exchange for information. In another case, claims were traced back to local high school students who had circulated rumors as a joke.

=== Aliens ===
Since the Snippy case in 1967, press had linked reports of unidentified aircraft to UFOs and flying saucers. In 1974, a few months after the first spate of alleged mutilations in the US, multiple farmers in Nebraska claimed to witness UFOs on the nights their cattle were harmed. The sightings were hailed by UFO researchers as the first physical evidence of extraterrestrial life. In 1980, journalist Linda Moulton Howe produced A Strange Harvest, a documentary on cattle mutilations. Based on information provided by a supposed-insider source named Richard C. Doty, Howe used the film to claim the mutilations were linked to UFOs and aliens.

The 2013 documentary Mirage Men suggests there was conspiracy by the U.S. military to fabricate UFO folklore in order to deflect attention from classified military projects. The book it is based on, also called Mirage Men, was published in 2010 by Constable & Robinson. Mirage Men discusess how, on April 20, 1979, U.S. Attorney R. E. Thompson and US Senator Harrison Schmidt held a public meeting about the ongoing cattle mutilations. The meeting was attended by about 80, including UFO researcher Paul Bennewitz. At the meeting, Bennewitz was introduced to highway patrol officer Gabe Valdez who was leading the state investigation into the incidents. Mirage Men suggests government agents likely "first identified" Bennewitz at this meeting and perhaps outright targeted him for his participation.

By August 1988, Bennewitz was accusing his wife of being in control of the extraterrestrials. After attempting to barricade himself in his home using sandbags, his family admitted him to the mental health unit of Presbyterian Anna Kaseman Hospital; he remained under observation there for one month.

External videos
- Bill Moore addresses MUFON, July 1 1989

On July 1, 1989, UFO author William Moore claimed that he tried to push Bennewitz into a mental breakdown by feeding him false information about aliens. This was corroborated by a declassified CIA document that claims Moore and Doty, identified as a former officer with the Air Force Office of Special Investigations, are responsible for a disinformation campaign against Bennewitz.

In 1990, the Bennewitz story was featured in Howard Blum's book Out There: The Government's Secret Quest for Extraterrestrials. Blum publicized that the government had sent undercover agents to befriend and mislead Bennewitz using counterfeit documents.

=== Mythic monsters ===
Folklore has attributed the mutilations to chupacabras and similar creatures. "Mothman" author John Keel mentioned investigating animal mutilation cases in 1966 (while with Ivan T. Sanderson) that were being reported in the Upper Ohio River Valley, around Gallipolis, Ohio.

== In popular culture ==
mockup of open range warning sign sometimes modified to add a saucer

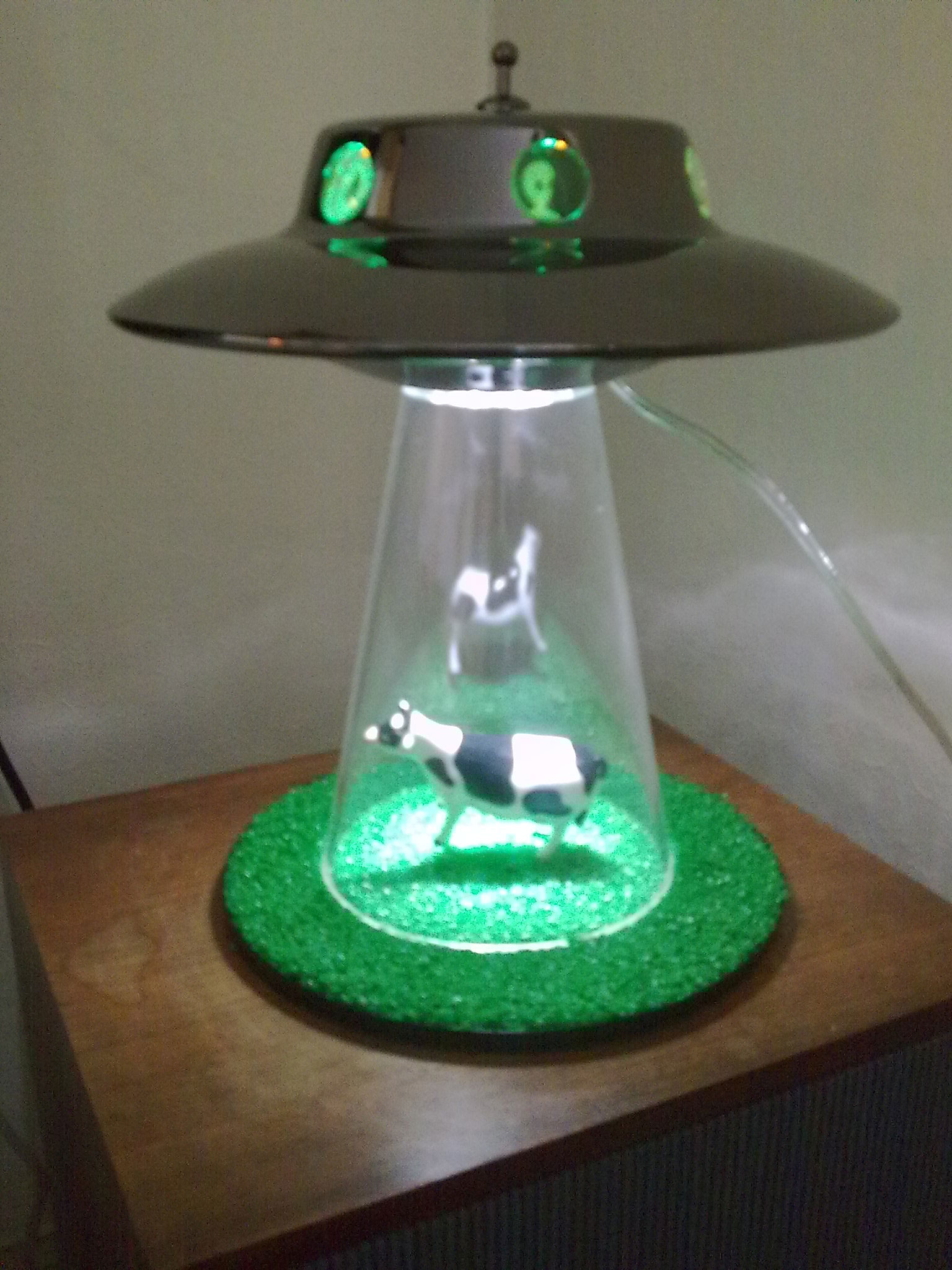
A novelty lamp depicting gray aliens in a flying saucer abducting a cow

In 1982, researcher David Perkins authored Altered Steaks on the topic. In 1984, Bantam Books published Mute Evidence by journalists Daniel Kagan and Ian Summers. In 2014, Christopher O'Brian authored Stalking the Herd.

The 1977 British television mockumentary Alternative 3 linked mutilations to a fictional plan to transport livestock to secret military bases on the Moon and Mars.

In the 1985 film Spies Like Us, Dan Aykroyd plays a spy who poses as an alien to distract a Soviet missile crew; Aykroyd's character translates a Soviet tale of aliens from a silver disk who dissected an ox. The 1992 film Sneakers featured Aykroyd as a conspiracy theorist who links aliens to cattle mutilations. The X-Files episodes "Eve" and "Irresistible" included mention of cattle mutilations. In Dulce, New Mexico and elsewhere, pranksters have added UFO images to roadside signs warning of cattle crossing. The 1997 pilot episode of South Park titled Cartman Gets an Anal Probe references UFO and aliens as being linked to cattle mutilation. The 2022 film Nope features a biological flying saucer that feeds on livestock. The 2025 album Bloodless by Samia loosely uses the phenomenon as a conceptual theme.

== See also ==
- Black helicopters
- Cow tipping
- Croydon Cat Killer
- Great Wyrley Outrages, a series of livestock mutilations in 1903 England.
- Horse ripping
- Linda Moulton Howe
- List of topics characterized as pseudoscience
- Rumors of equine mutilation in France in 2020
- Surplus killing
