= Horse-ripping =

Infliction of serious injuries upon horses

Horse-ripping, or horse slashing, is an animal cruelty phenomenon involving serious injuries in horses, often involving mutilation of their genitalia and slashing of the flank or neck. It has not been established, however, how often these injuries are caused by human cruelty.

== Incidents ==
There were 160 reported incidents in Britain between 1983 and 1993, and 300 incidents in Germany between 1992 and 1998.

It has become a widespread belief in recent years that these attacks are carried out deliberately by people, and are often sexually motivated. Animal welfare officers have also drawn links between attacks on horses and "fertility cults". In Arizona, one case in 2004 which was initially believed to be horse-ripping was later reported to have been wounds caused by another horse.

The Guardian reported in 2001 that investigations showed it was doubtful whether all "horse-ripping" incidents can be ascribed to human acts. For the similar cattle mutilation, primarily a US phenomenon, UFOs, cults and animal cruelty have been blamed, but research showed there were natural or undetermined causes in the vast majority of cases.

== In literature ==
The short story Romulus (1883) by the Danish author Karl Gjellerup features cruelty to a noble race horse. The story was inspired by a contemporary case where the Royal Chamberlain was accused of animal cruelty.

The play Equus from 1973 elaborates the psychology of a young horse mutilator. It also was inspired by a then-contemporary series of horse blindings. Based on the play, the film Equus was produced in 1977.

In Dostoyevsky's novel Crime and Punishment, the protagonist Rodion Raskolnikov has a dream about a mare being whipped and eventually bludgeoned to death with an iron bar by a drunken man, while a large crowd encourages and helps him.

The novel Arthur & George by Julian Barnes centers around Arthur Conan Doyle's involvement with the Great Wryley Outrages, a series of mutilations committed against horses and other livestock in 1903.

== See also ==
- Cattle mutilation
- Horse sacrifice
- Moral panic
- Zoosadism
