= Rumors of equine mutilation in France in 2020 =

Controversy of equine mutilation

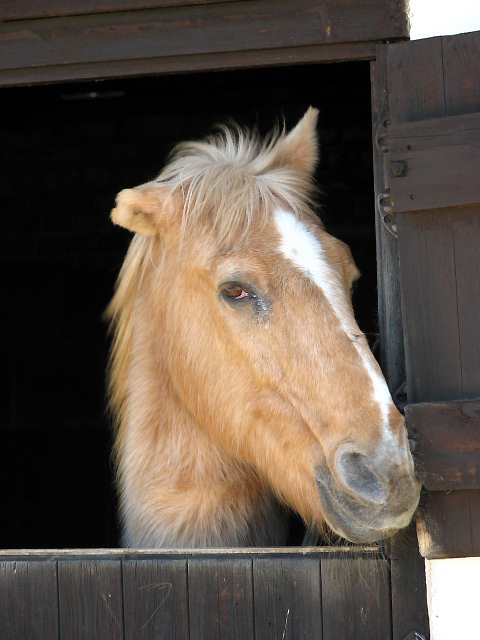
Palomino horse in its stall, with a damaged right ear

The rumor of equine mutilation in France in 2020 was a French media and court case that gained momentum across France. Beginning in early 2020, rumors circulated of horses and donkeys being killed and mutilated. Around 30 animals were reported mutilated between January and August 2020, and many with an ear cut off (usually the animal's right ear). A number of possible explanations were put forward, including fetishism, a cult of a Satanist nature, and an internet challenge.

The case mobilized the French Minister of Agriculture, Julien Denormandie. Journalistic investigations showed that it was "a collective psychosis" motivated by the quest for fame of certain false witnesses and influencers, with inquiries concluding that "the vast majority of deaths had natural causes", and that the mutilations were the work of scavenging animals.

== Context ==
Cattle and horse mutilations are not a new phenomenon, with reports occurring sporadically since the 1970s and 1980s in English-speaking countries and Germany in particular, most often without clear explanation.

In May 2020, Le Nouveau Détective published an article about horses killed with their ears cut off with a scalpel.

== Course of events ==
=== Origin of the rumor ===
The first reports in France date back to early 2020, but the phenomenon accelerated during the summer. Between February 2020 and July 1, 2020, around ten horses and donkeys were affected across France, including at least four in the Picardie region. The first report concerned a horse in Quend beach and two others in Berny-en-Santerre (Somme), all three found dead with their right ear severed. The case was revealed by the weekly Le Nouveau Détective at the end of May, which incriminated a "gang of horse killers".

=== Pauline Sarrazin's false testimony ===
On June 6, 2020, Pauline Sarrazin, a woman from Dieppe, claimed to have found one of her mares in agony, its right ear cut off and its head smashed in. She alerted the police, then Les Informations dieppoises - the local newspaper. She also set up a Facebook group (Justice pour nos chevaux) to gather testimonies. The group brings together breeders who have been confronted with similar cases. Sarrazin filed a complaint on June 25.

People claiming to be owners of mutilated French horses organized themselves on social networks in June 2020, in particular to record these cases. By the end of August, the number of horses killed and mutilated throughout France had risen to 33 animals, around twenty of which had had their ears cut off.

=== Moral panic ===
As rumors swirled, on August 28, French Minister of Agriculture Julien Denormandie traveled to Saône-et-Loire to meet and support the owners of a mutilated horse. A special investigation unit dedicated to mutilated horses was set up at national level.

According to the Ministry of the Interior, "certain facts [were] reminiscent of practices linked to sectarian rituals and in particular so-called Satanic rituals". All types of horse were concerned by these killings and mutilations, with the exception of draft horses. The cutting off and collecting of ears suggests fetishism or trophy collecting, typical of serial killers. Psychopathy was also suggested, as well as a link with bullfighting, as the practice of cutting off a bull's ear is known, as is the act of exsanguination.

During the night of August 30–31, 2020, two motorists were stopped by an armed woman breeder and her daughter, and accused of scouting to mutilate horses near Rosporden. The two women lodged a complaint, which led to a court summons for the breeder and her daughter, who were charged with violence with weapons and interfering with a public function. They received a six-month suspended prison sentence and were also banned from carrying weapons for three years. Franck Buors, the two victims' lawyer, was awarded €800 in damages for the moral prejudice suffered by his restaurant owner client, and €500 for his other client.

The media coverage caused a stir on social networks, with calls for manhunts and lynchings of the culprits, and reports of vehicle registration plates. This resulted in holidaymakers having their vehicles wrongly reported (leading to harassment), and accusations incriminating young suspects, attributed to a vet, were proven false. Several horse owners decided to stop taking their horses out. The Finistère Gendarmerie subsequently called on farmers "not to take the law into their own hands". On September 9, French Minister of Agriculture Julien Denormandie announced the creation of a toll-free number for owners of horse victims, to be answered by 15 specialists from the Institut français du cheval et de l'équitation.

The discovery of mutilations in the Jura region of Switzerland prompted comments in the Swiss press.

On various social networks, an "absurd joke" claimed that Nagui was responsible for the mutilations.

=== Investigations ===
At the end of June 2020, the Service Central du Renseignement Territorial cross-referenced these various cases, and favored the idea of superstition or a satanic ritual. Among other things, research was carried out on the dark web.

On August 24, 2020, the Yonne gendarmerie released the sketch of a suspect, after he was spotted attempting to attack ponies on private property in the commune of Villefranche Saint Phal, with an accomplice. The suspect was put on the run by the owner of the ponies, who intervened and was injured during the altercation. The owner would later say, "I heard them talking in a foreign language, with a strong Eastern accent".

On August 28, Julien Denormandie gave an update on the ongoing investigation, which did not point to the incrimination of an organized community or a mimicry effect. At the end of August, rumors of horse mutilations in Pouzauges and Talmont-Saint-Hilaire, Vendée, turned out to be false.

On August 30, the Gendarmerie arrested a 35-year-old Polish national in Seine-Maritime, who resembled the composite sketch circulated by the authorities in Yonne, at the wheel of his van. Investigators also discovered a commando knife in the vehicle. After verifying his alibi, the man was cleared and released. On September 7, 2020, another suspect resembling the sketch was taken into custody in the Haut-Rhin region, but was later cleared and released.

At the beginning of September 2020, initial reports stated that the human origin of the mutilations was only certain in 20 to 25% of cases. The possibility of scavengers was also raised. Jacky Cordonnier, historian of religions and specialist in sectarian movements (MIVILUDES), attributed the abuse and mutilation to witchcraft rituals, in particular those aimed at appropriating the animal's strength by recovering its blood, eyes or ears. By September 8, 153 investigations had been opened throughout France in connection with this case.

In the town of Arnac-la-Poste, searches were carried out by the gendarmerie services, who were in contact with the national gendarmerie, to check whether there had already been any similarities in investigations at national level. Numerous leads existed in the search for a perpetrator or possible imitators, but none were successful.

== Reactions ==
The French Equestrian Federation filed a civil action on August 19, 2020, in support of the equine owners who had lodged a complaint. The Interministerial Mission for Vigilance and Combat against Sectarian Drifts (MIVILUDES) also announced that it was providing assistance on the case.

The Brigitte-Bardot Foundation filed a civil suit.

The French Gendarmerie advised horse owners to monitor meadows daily, not leave halters on horses, and install a CCTV.

=== Political figures ===
Jean-Luc Poulain, president of the Paris Horse Show, denounced on RTL "a network of mentally ill people" and "unspeakable" acts.

Agriculture Minister Julien Denormandie spoke of "acts of cruelty of unimaginable barbarity".

== Hoax revealed ==
=== Questioning the attacks ===
By the end of summer 2020, 500 cases of mutilation had been reported, of which 80 were attributable to humans (16% of attacks). These results were published in September 2020 in a Libération CheckNews, some of the reports being rumors. According to Mathieu Deslandes, a journalist with La Revue des Médias (INA), who investigated the subject, these attacks were not coordinated. "These are isolated cases that have no link between them. There are no gangs crossing France to attack horses". Of the ten or so cases of mutilation reported in Ille-et-Vilaine, none were of human origin. The flood of calls were considered by the gendarmerie to be a "veritable collective hysteria".

On August 27, a forensic examination of the corpse of a horse found in Sainte-Colombe-sur-Gand, in the Loire region, ruled out human involvement, as the post-mortem mutilations (eye gouged out, ear cut off and snout sliced off) were the result of the action of a scavenging animal such as a badger or rodent. In most cases, the "mutilations" observed were ultimately considered by experts to be classic attacks by scavengers on already dead animals, who primarily target the parts that are easy to remove (ears and eyes).

At the end of 2020, Marie-Béatrice Tonanny, national coordinator at the sub-directorate of the judicial police, revealed in an interview with the Agence France-Presse (AFP) that "acts of cruelty have not exploded compared with other years [...] There has been a small increase, perhaps due to media coverage and copycats. What has exploded is the number of reports, of calls from people telling us 'my horse is injured'".

=== Pauline Sarrazin's version questioned ===
An investigation has been opened against Pauline Sarrazin. On June 4, 2020 - two days before the death of her mare - Pauline had received a message from the Direction départementale de la protection des populations telling her that she would be checked. The alert had been given on June 2 by a veterinarian who had already had to euthanize five of Pauline Sarrazin's horses in seven months, the others being "skinny", "underfed" and "infested with lice". On several occasions, he told Pauline Sarrazin that the quantities of feed provided were insufficient, that she obviously couldn't afford to keep so many animals. He didn't mention the accumulated unpaid bills - confinement had deprived her of her temp assignments, he understood - but suggested that her kindness was being abused.

In January 2021, she confessed that she had lied, and was in fact responsible for the mare's death. Her dog Louna had attacked the mare's corpse for lack of food and, not wanting her to be euthanized, she had invented the lie.

== Aftermath ==
On June 25, 2021, Pauline Sarrazin was sentenced by the Dieppe Criminal Court to a "four-month suspended prison sentence for ill-treatment and false denunciation", and banned from owning an animal for three years, as well as from exercising a profession related to horses.

=== Journalist for Informations Dieppoises ===
Augustin Bouquet des Chaux, journalist with Informations Dieppoises and the first to have "starred" the false plaintiff Pauline Sarrazin, made his mea culpa in view of the consequences of his error: "It wasn't done in haste, I wasn't looking for buzz at any price, the courts were taking the case seriously... I could have been a little less assertive, but I don't feel I made a mistake", even if "without Pauline S., the mutilated horses, it would have stayed in Détective".

According to public prosecutor Étienne Thieffry, "There is sometimes a gap between the way we perceive accounts of offenses and the impact they can have [...]. We had to take the time to investigate".

== See also ==
- Rumor
- Cattle mutilation
- Equine ethics

== Bibliography ==
- Leloup, Damien (2021). Podcast. Chevaux mutilés : itinéraire d'une psychose collective (in French). Le Monde.
- Deslandes, Mathieu (2023). Chevaux mutilés : enquête sur un mensonge (in French). Institut national de l'audiovisuel.
