= Beech Creek Township, Pennsylvania =

Township in Pennsylvania, US

Coordinates: 41°07′29″N 77°45′00″W

- Township
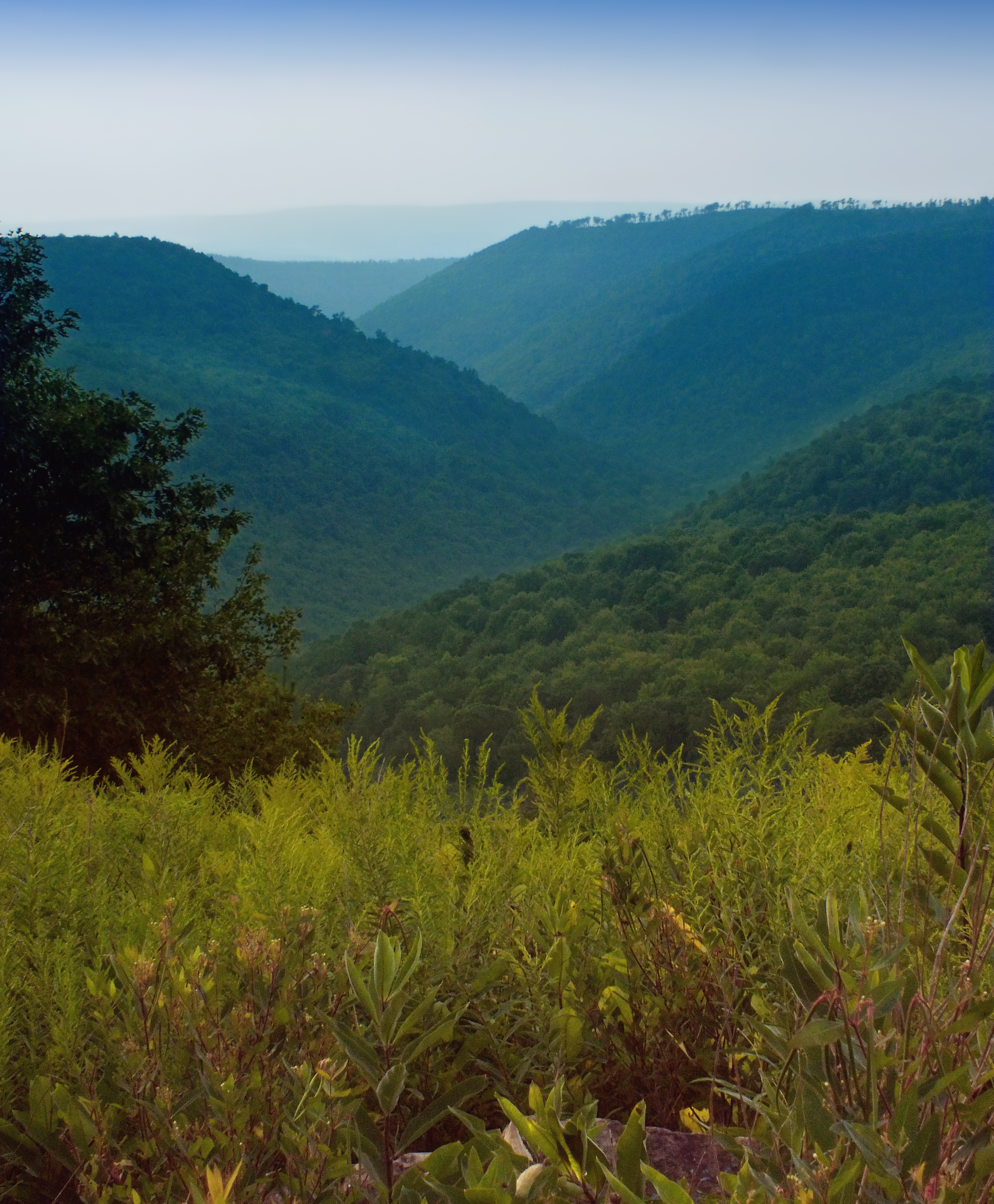
- A scenic vista from the Russell P. Letterman Wild Area within Sproul State Forest

- Location in Clinton County and the state of Pennsylvania.
- Country: United States
- State: Pennsylvania
- County: Clinton
- Settled: 1793
- Incorporated: 1850

Area
  - Total: 94.50 sq mi (244.76 km^{2})
  - Land: 94.25 sq mi (244.11 km^{2})
  - Water: 0.25 sq mi (0.65 km^{2})

Population (2020)
  - Total: 966 ▼
  - Estimate (2021): 966
  - Density: 10.7/sq mi (4.13/km^{2})
- FIPS code: 42-035-04992

Beech Creek Township is a township in Clinton County, Pennsylvania, United States. The population was 966 at the 2020 census. It was the location of unrealized proposal Project Ketch to explode a 24-kiloton nuclear device to create capacity for underground natural gas storage in 1964.

== Geography ==
According to the United States Census Bureau, the township has a total area of 94.5 square miles (244.8 km^{2}), of which 94.2 square miles (244.1 km^{2}) is land and 0.23 square miles (0.6 km^{2}), or 0.26%, is water.

== Communities ==
- Bear Swamp
- East Beech

== Demographics ==
Historical population
Census	Pop.	Note	%±
1980	951		—
1990	1,007		5.9%
2000	1,010		0.3%
2010	1,015		0.5%
2020	966		−4.8%
2021 (est.)	966		0.0%

As of the census of 2000, there were 1,010 people, 393 households, and 306 families residing in the township. The population density was 10.5 people per square mile (4.1/km^{2}). There were 653 housing units at an average density of 6.8/sq mi (2.6/km^{2}). The racial makeup of the township was 98.42% White, 0.10% African American, 0.40% Native American, 0.20% Asian, 0.20% Pacific Islander, 0.50% from other races, and 0.20% from two or more races. Hispanic or Latino of any race were 1.19% of the population.

There were 393 households, out of which 31.0% had children under the age of 18 living with them, 64.6% were married couples living together, 8.4% had a female householder with no husband present, and 22.1% were non-families. 17.3% of all households were made up of individuals, and 7.4% had someone living alone who was 65 years of age or older. The average household size was 2.57 and the average family size was 2.85.

In the township the population was spread out, with 23.3% under the age of 18, 6.8% from 18 to 24, 28.4% from 25 to 44, 27.9% from 45 to 64, and 13.6% who were 65 years of age or older. The median age was 40 years. For every 100 females, there were 101.2 males. For every 100 females age 18 and over, there were 97.7 males.

The median income for a household in the township was $37,708, and the median income for a family was $40,903. Males had a median income of $27,366 versus $20,417 for females. The per capita income for the township was $16,983. About 6.2% of families and 8.3% of the population were below the poverty line, including 13.4% of those under age 18 and 6.4% of those age 65 or over.
