= Project Ketch =

1964 American nuclear excavation proposal

Coordinates: 41°10′57″N 77°53′25″W

Project Ketch was a 1964 United States Atomic Energy Commission (AEC) proposal to use nuclear explosives to excavate a natural gas storage reservoir in Pennsylvania. The project was proposed as a component of Project Plowshare, which sought ways to use nuclear devices in public works and industrial development projects. The project was the only Plowshare project proposed for the northeastern United States.

A detailed study for the project was published in 1967, but the project stalled after local opposition developed. Project Gasbuggy, a similar test in New Mexico that was carried out in 1968, showed that better understanding of the effects of rock fracturing was needed before Project Ketch could proceed. The project was never pursued any further.

== Proposal ==
In the early 1960s, the AEC worked to publicize the Project Plowshare program for peaceful use of atomic devices. The 1960s saw government-mandated low prices for natural gas, providing little incentive for exploration of new gas sources, and contributed to gas shortages. A consistent theme of Plowshare was the creation and use of underground cavities for natural gas storage. Storage reservoirs are used to balance divergences between supply and demand, as contingency against emergencies, and as a means of arbitrage. Existing storage reservoirs tended to be concentrated in areas away from their markets, and a demand was seen for additional storage capacity, closer to markets in the northeastern United States in an area without sufficient natural reservoirs.

Discussions between the AEC and the Columbia Gas Corporation began in 1964 to find a suitable site for a demonstration project in Pennsylvania. The project's focus was an area to the south of Renovo in Sproul State Forest, close to areas that had seen gas exploration and near existing gas transmission pipelines, which was seen as thinly populated and of marginal economic usefulness. The proposed Plowshare experiment was named "Project Ketch". General area survey work by the AEC and Columbia took place in 1965–66. Discussions with the Pennsylvania state government began in 1966. Surveys referred to the local residents as "natives", and characterized their dwellings as "rickety". No effort was made to assess local views concerning the project, suggesting that "[f]rom very limited contact, the native populations would appear somewhat resistant to change or progress and may take some convincing." News of the project first came to public notice in a February 14, 1967, article in the Pittsburgh Press.

An AEC study, published in July 1967, stated that as a result of the detonation, "There would be no air blast effects, of course, and radiation effects would be safely contained underground." It went on to assert that "Purging of the chimney, filtration and dehydration treatment at the wellhead can be employed to eliminate appreciable radioactivity from gas stored in the reservoir. Levels attainable should render the gas suitable for use in existing pipeline facilities, and provide a favorable basis for determinations regarding eventual public consumption." The report projected that radioactivity would be reduced significantly in the six to nine months following the explosion, while krypton-85 and tritium "might require flushing from the chimney". The report stated that dilution during transmission and combustion would in general reduce radioactivity below permissible limits.

An August 11, 1967, letter from Pennsylvania governor Raymond P. Shafer granted conditional approval to the project for site evaluation studies, reserving the right to refuse approval of later phases if the project was shown to not benefit the Commonwealth of Pennsylvania. However, a lease was still required for the site before work could begin.

== Opposition and cancellation ==
Once the project became known, local residents began to ask about potential effects of the project. AEC and Columbia responses asserted that there would be no problems, emphasizing the remoteness of the "wilderness" area and its apparently marginal economic utility, implying that the region was effectively empty of population or utility. Initially the project was presented as a demonstration and did not describe any immediate economic value or benefit. After this rationale began to be questioned, the AEC and Columbia suggested that the demonstration project would lead to economic development of the region, with potentially thousands more blasts, these much closer to population centers once the concept had been tried in a remote area. Opposition coalesced in Renovo, 12 miles (19 km) from the site, and in State College, 30 miles (48 km) away. Although the area had been clearcut for timber before the 1930s, it was portrayed by opposition as "unsoiled mountain land".

Louis Roddis Jr., a nuclear engineer and member of the Pennsylvania Governor's Science Advisory Committee, wrote that "there is a distinct public relations problem since the northeastern United States is not as accustomed to either earthquake shocks or nuclear test shots as is the southwestern United States."

On December 10, 1967, a similar test was carried out near Dulce, New Mexico. Project Gasbuggy sought to gather data on fracturing low-permeability strata to stimulate gas production. Gasbuggy succeeded in increasing permeability, to the point that groundwater filled an unexpected proportion of the fractures. The Gasbuggy results indicated that better understanding of local hydrology should be established for similar projects. The Pennsylvania project stalled, and no work was undertaken. As opposition became more focused, Columbia withdrew from the project in 1968. The required site lease was never negotiated. Funding for Plowshare ceased in 1975.

Following the removal of the Renovo site from consideration, several other sites in Kentucky, Maryland, New York, Ohio, Virginia and West Virginia were considered, with Kentucky and West Virginia lobbying for the project.

== Project ==
The test site location was to be in Sproul State Forest, Beech Creek Township, in Clinton County, Pennsylvania, close to Centre County. The location was in the southwestern end of the Hyner Anticline, in the Chemung Portage Group of strata. The project proposed the detonation of a 24-kiloton nuclear device in an 18-inch (46 cm) wide borehole, at a depth of about 3,300 feet (1,000 m) to create a cavity suitable for natural gas storage. The location was near an existing gas storage area in the Leidy gas field. The result of the detonation was expected to be a rubble-filled "chimney," about 90 feet (27 m) wide and about 300 feet (91 m) tall, capped by impermeable formations. Fractures were expected to extend to a radius of around 650 feet (200 m). The natural gas storage capacity was expected to be about 465,000,000 cubic feet (13,200,000 kl), stored at 2,100 pounds per square inch (140 bar) pressure.

The proposed project phasing envisioned the following:

- Phase I: 8 months of study and evaluation for feasibility
- Phase II: 6 months of construction, drilling the borehole, and detonation of the device
- Phase III: 11 months of measurements of the cavern and radiological surveys
- Phase IV: 6 months of gas storage facility development
- Phase V: 14 months of initial operation and evaluation

Construction costs for a typical operational facility were expected to be from $1.55 million (equivalent to $14,484,000 in 2025) for a small reservoir using a 24-kiloton device to $2.08 million (equivalent to $20,084,000 in 2025) for one created with a 100-kiloton device. The assumed costs to obtain a nuclear device from the AEC were $390,000 for a 24-kiloton device, to $460,000 for a 100-kiloton device, in 1967 costs.
