= A Strange Harvest =

1980 TV documentary by Linda Moulton Howe

- Written by: Linda Moulton Howe
- Directed by: Linda Moulton Howe
- Presented by: Linda Moulton Howe
- Narrated by: Linda Moulton Howe
- Composer: Jake Martin
- Country of origin: United States
- Original language: English

Production
- Producer: Linda Moulton Howe
- Editors: Linda Moulton Howe; Richard Lerner
- Running time: 57 minutes

Original release
- Network: KMGH-TV
- Release: May 25, 1980

A Strange Harvest is a 1980 American television documentary film written, produced, narrated and directed by Linda Moulton Howe, investigating the phenomenon of cattle mutilation in the United States, Canada, and elsewhere throughout the 1970s, and the possibility of extraterrestrial UFO activity as an explanation. The film was first broadcast on KMGH-TV in Denver, Colorado, on May 25, 1980, and received a Regional Emmy Award. (Note: The film received a Regional Emmy Award in either the category of Audio Achievement or Outstanding TV Documentary.)

== Synopsis ==
A Strange Harvest centers around the phenomenon of cattle mutilation, in which cows (often reported by their ranchers to have been healthy cows) are found dead and apparently mutilated; body parts such as their rectums and sexual organs, udders, ears, eyeballs, tongue, or jaw flesh are removed, often with what appear to be clean, precise cuts. Typically there is a lack of tracks or other evidence of activity in the environment surrounding the carcasses. Several hypotheses are considered, including surgical lasers, secret government agencies, stealth helicopters, and extraterrestrial UFOs.

Howe interviews a number of subjects: Theron Wilde, a Wyoming deputy sheriff investigating cattle mutilations; C. E. Potts and Manuel Gomez, ranchers from Colorado and New Mexico respectively who each found their cattle mutilated; George Yarnell, an Elbert County sheriff; Tex Graves, a former Logan County sheriff; Albert McChesney, D.V.M., a pathologist and coordinator at Colorado State University, whose diagnostic laboratory performed analysis on 35 mutilated carcasses, of which 19 were examined and found to be either the result of natural predation or the use of a sharp instrument; Bill Waugh, a former Elbert County undersheriff who claims to have witnessed mysterious lights in the sky in the mid-1970s; Drexel Lawson, who runs a dead livestock removal service in Colorado Springs; Arlen Meyers, M.D., a laser surgeon at Rose Medical Center in Denver; Steve Benavidez and Arnold Valdez of the Costilla County Sheriff's Department; Lou Girodo, chief investigator at the district attorney's office in Trinidad, Colorado; CW3 William S. Dalby of the 4th Aviation Battalion in Fort Carson; Carl W. Whiteside, deputy director at the Colorado Bureau of Investigation; Pat McGuire of Bosler, Wyoming, who found two of his cows mutilated and undergoes a hypnotherapy session guided by Prof. Leo Sprinkle of the University of Wyoming; and ufologist Richard Sigismond.

== Production and broadcast ==
Linda Moulton Howe joined KMGH-TV, which was at the time a CBS affiliate, in 1976 as a director of special projects; Howe wrote, produced, directed and edited TV documentaries for the station and also did on-air TV reporting. In 1979, she became interested in the phenomenon of cattle mutilation when one of her crew members told her about work he did for the ABC program 20/20 investigating cattle mutilation, leading Howe to write, produce and direct A Strange Harvest for KMGH-TV. Howe later wrote a book on the subject, titled Alien Harvest, published in 1989.

A Strange Harvest first aired on KMGH-TV on May 25, 1980, and earned a Regional Emmy Award.
