= Linda Moulton Howe =

American journalist

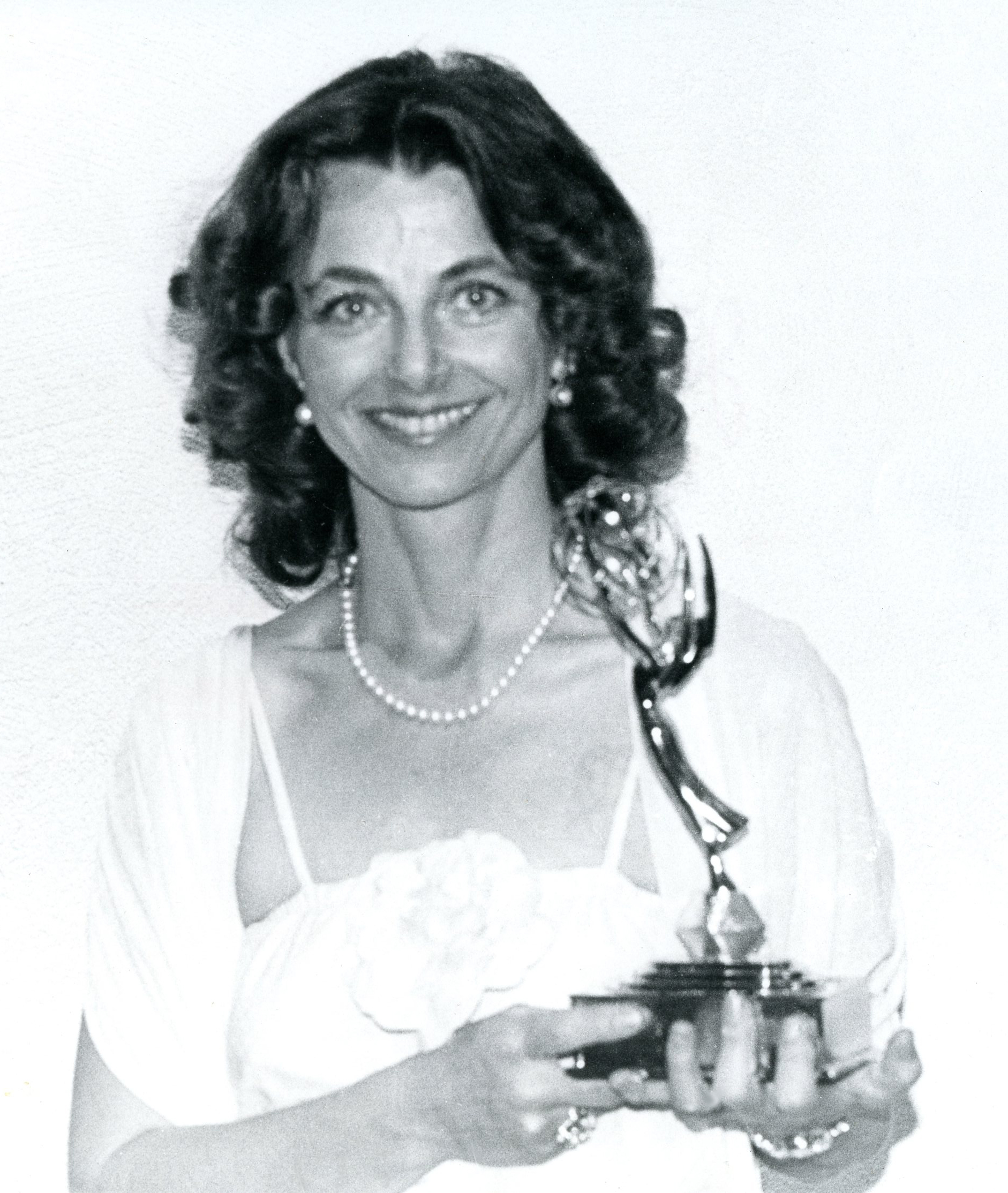
- Howe in 1981
- Born: Linda Ann Moulton; January 20, 1942 (age 84); Boise, Idaho, U.S.
- Education: University of Colorado (BA); Stanford University (MA)
- Occupations: Investigative journalist; author; television and radio reporter

YouTube information
- Channel: Earthfiles
- Years active: 2007–present
- Genre: Photography
- Subscribers: 300 thousand
- Views: 35.2 million
- Last updated: February 12, 2026
- Website: Earthfiles.com

Linda Moulton Howe (born January 20, 1942) is an American investigative journalist and documentary film maker best known for her work as a ufologist and advocate of a variety of conspiracy theories, including her investigation of cattle mutilations and conclusion that they are performed by extraterrestrials. She is also noted for her speculations that the U.S. government is working with aliens.

== Early life ==
She was born Linda Ann Moulton in Boise, Idaho. Howe entered the 1963 Miss Boise pageant for college scholarships and went on to win the 1963 Miss Idaho crown and scholarships, and participated in the Miss America 1964 pageant that year in Atlantic City. Howe received her 1965 B.A. cum laude in English Literature from the University of Colorado. In 1966, Howe was awarded the Stanley Baubaire Scholarship for her master's degree work at Stanford University, Palo Alto, California. She received her master's degree in communication from Stanford University in 1968, where she produced a documentary film for the Stanford Medical Center and her Master's Thesis, "A Picture Calculus", at the Stanford Linear Accelerator.

== Career ==
Howe's early work focused on environmental issues. From 1978 to 1983, Howe was director of special projects at KMGH-TV, Channel 7, Denver, Colorado. Her documentaries included Poison in the Wind and A Sun Kissed Poison which compared smog pollution in Los Angeles and Denver, Fire In The Water about hydrogen as an alternative energy source to fossil fuels, and A Radioactive Water about uranium contamination of public drinking water in a Denver suburb. Howe was on staff at WCVB-TV when the station won an Institutional Peabody Award for institutional excellence in 1975.

In 1980, Howe wrote, produced, and directed A Strange Harvest, a documentary that suggested unusual wounds found on cattle are the work of extraterrestrial beings who harvest body parts required for their survival or research, and that the U.S. government is complicit. Howe became known as a "staunch advocate" for these ideas, and began to focus on UFO conspiracy theories and speculate about alleged connections between cattle mutilations, UFOs and supposed government conspiracies, saying "I am convinced that one or more alien intelligences are affecting this planet". Although Howe claimed she was shown secret documents after being taken into confidence by an agent of the government, author John Greer wrote that Howe presented no evidence for such claims other than "the very ambiguous evidence provided by rotting cow carcasses".

One Idaho state director of Mutual UFO Network (MUFON) called her "the most preeminent UFO investigator in the world", and she was named as one of "the gurus of American ufology", although Howe has said she regards herself as a television producer and investigative reporter. Much of Howe's work includes speculations about what she terms "unexplained" phenomena, such as cattle mutilations, crop circles, UFO sightings, and alien abductions.

Howe has proposed that some photographs of crop circles show evidence of mysterious energy she terms "visible light phenomena". Joe Nickell described Howe as a "credulous journalist" in a 2002 article in Skeptical Inquirer magazine, saying that photos Howe published purporting to show mysterious energy are simply misinterpretations of photographic accidents, such as a camera's wrist strap reflecting the flash, or circular artifacts caused by floating dust, errors that Nickell calls "the stock-in-trade of ghost hunters".

In 1983, a man identifying himself as United States Air Force Sergeant Richard C. Doty contacted Howe claiming to be able to supply her Air Force records for her HBO documentary The ET Factor, only to pull out without providing any evidence to substantiate his story. Doty invited Howe to Kirtland Air Force Base, where he showed her a variety of fabricated documents. Writes Pilkington: "Some years later Doty would deny ever having had this exchange with Howe, who responded by signing a sworn statement that the discussions had taken place. She also provided documentation of her dealings with both Doty and HBO. Why AFOSI decided to deceive Linda Howe is unclear. Was it always their plan to shut down the HBO production or was this just an unexpected bonus? We may not know exactly why, but we know they did it and, twenty-four years later, Doty admits that the exchange took place, much as Linda Howe described it. Its purpose was connected to AFOSI's disinformation programme against Bennewitz. As Doty put it: 'We gave Linda some good information, and some bad information. She chose the bad information.' And that's all he had to say on the matter." Doty reiterated his role misleading Howe in the 2013 documentary Mirage Men, in which Howe also appeared.

Howe has produced numerous UFO related programming, including a two-hour special Earth Mysteries: Alien Life Forms in association with WATL-Fox, Atlanta, was supervising producer and original concept creator for UFO Report: Sightings financed by Paramount Studios and the Fox network in Los Angeles that was first broadcast in October 1991 and became the Sightings series on Fox.

Howe appeared on a panel at UFO Disclosure press event held at the National Press Club in 2013, saying she believed "alien technology appears so advanced" that "space and time could be bent by outer space travelers, therefore allowing extraterrestrials to visit Earth".

Howe was a frequent guest on Coast to Coast AM for years, dating back to 2003 with George Noory, and 1991 with Art Bell. In 2019, she ended her monthly appearances on the show. Howe has been interviewed on Larry King Live specials, CNN; The O'Reilly Factor, Fox; Sightings and Strange Universe, Fox; NBC's The Other Side; Britain's Union Pictures, ITN and BBC; The Discovery Channel special Evidence On Earth; the NBC network special, Mysterious Origins of Man; the documentary Mirage Men; and the History Channel television series Ancient Aliens.

Howe remains active as the host of a weekly broadcast on YouTube that dates back to 2007.

== Awards ==
- She received a Regional Emmy Award for her work on A Strange Harvest.
- For her early work focusing on environmental issues, she received Colorado's Florence Sabin Award for “outstanding contribution to public health" in 1982.
- Howe's An Alien Harvest received a New Mexico-Arizona Southwest Book Award in 2015.

== Personal life ==
Linda Moulton Howe's father was Chet Moulton, Idaho's Director of Aeronautics from 1946 to 1971 and recipient of multiple aviation honors.

== Bibliography ==
- Alien Harvest: Further Evidence Linking Animal Mutilations and Human Abductions to Alien Life Forms. Linda Moulton Howe Productions (1989). ISBN 0-9620570-1-0.
  - 2nd edition expanded in text, illustrations and documents, with forewords by Jacques Vallée and Jim Marrs (2014). ISBN 978-0-9620570-0-7.
- Glimpses of Other Realities. Linda Moulton Howe Productions.
  - Vol. I: Facts and Eyewitnesses (1993). ISBN 0-9620570-5-3.
  - Vol. II: High Strangeness (1998). ISBN 0-9620570-3-7.
- Mysterious Lights and Crop Circles. Linda Moulton Howe Productions (2002). ISBN 0-9620570-6-1.
