= Project Gasbuggy =

1967 nuclear test explosion in New Mexico, United States

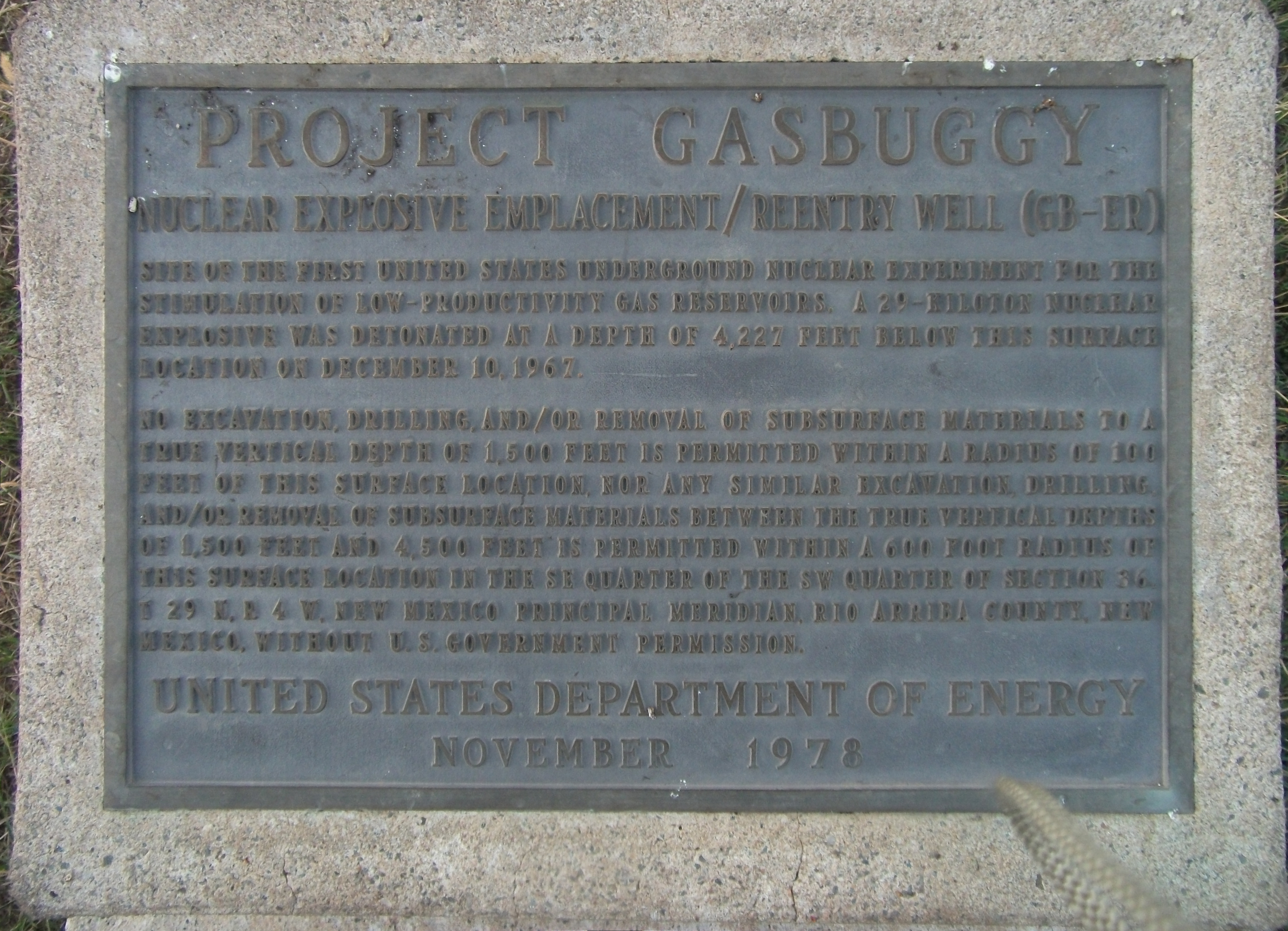

Information
- Country: United States
- Test series: Operation Crosstie; Project Plowshare
- Test site: Carson National Forest
- Coordinates: 36.67804°N 107.20921°W
- Date: December 10, 1967
- Test type: Underground
- Yield: 29 kt

Project Gasbuggy was an underground nuclear detonation carried out by the United States Atomic Energy Commission on December 10, 1967 in rural northwestern New Mexico. It was part of Operation Plowshare, a program designed to find peaceful uses for nuclear explosions.

Gasbuggy was carried out by the Lawrence Livermore Radiation Laboratory and the El Paso Natural Gas Company, with funding from the Atomic Energy Commission. Its purpose was to determine if nuclear explosions could be useful in fracturing rock formations for natural gas extraction. The site, lying in the Carson National Forest, is approximately 21 miles (34 km) southwest of Dulce, New Mexico and 54 miles (87 km) east of Farmington, and was chosen because natural gas deposits were known to be held in sandstone beneath Leandro Canyon. A 29-kiloton-of-TNT (120 TJ) device was placed at a depth of 4,227 feet (1,288 m) underground, then the well was backfilled before the device was detonated; a crowd had gathered to watch the detonation from atop a nearby butte.

The detonation took place after a couple of delays, the last one caused by a breakdown of the explosive refrigeration system. The detonation produced a rubble chimney that was 80 feet (24 m) wide and 335 feet (102 m) high above the blast center.

After an initial surface cleanup effort the site sat idle for over a decade. A later surface cleanup effort primarily tackled leftover toxic materials. In 1978, a marker monument was installed at the Surface Ground Zero (SGZ) point that provided basic explanation of the historic test. Below the main plaque lies another which indicates that no drilling or digging is allowed without government permission.

The site is publicly accessible via the Carson National Forest, F.S. 357 dirt road/Indian J10 that leads into the Carson National Forest.

Following the Project Gasbuggy test, two subsequent nuclear explosion fracturing experiments were conducted in western Colorado in an effort to refine the technique: Project Rulison in 1969 and Project Rio Blanco in 1973. In both cases the gas radioactivity was still seen as too high and in Project Rio Blanco the triple-blast rubble chimney structures disappointed the design engineers. Soon after that test the approximately 15-year Project Plowshare program funding dried up.

Project Gasbuggy detonation site

In 2011, the United States Department of Energy reported that even after 25 years of gas production of all the natural gas deemed recoverable, only 15 to 40 percent of the investment could be recovered.

These early fracturing tests were later superseded by hydraulic fracturing technologies.

== Gallery ==
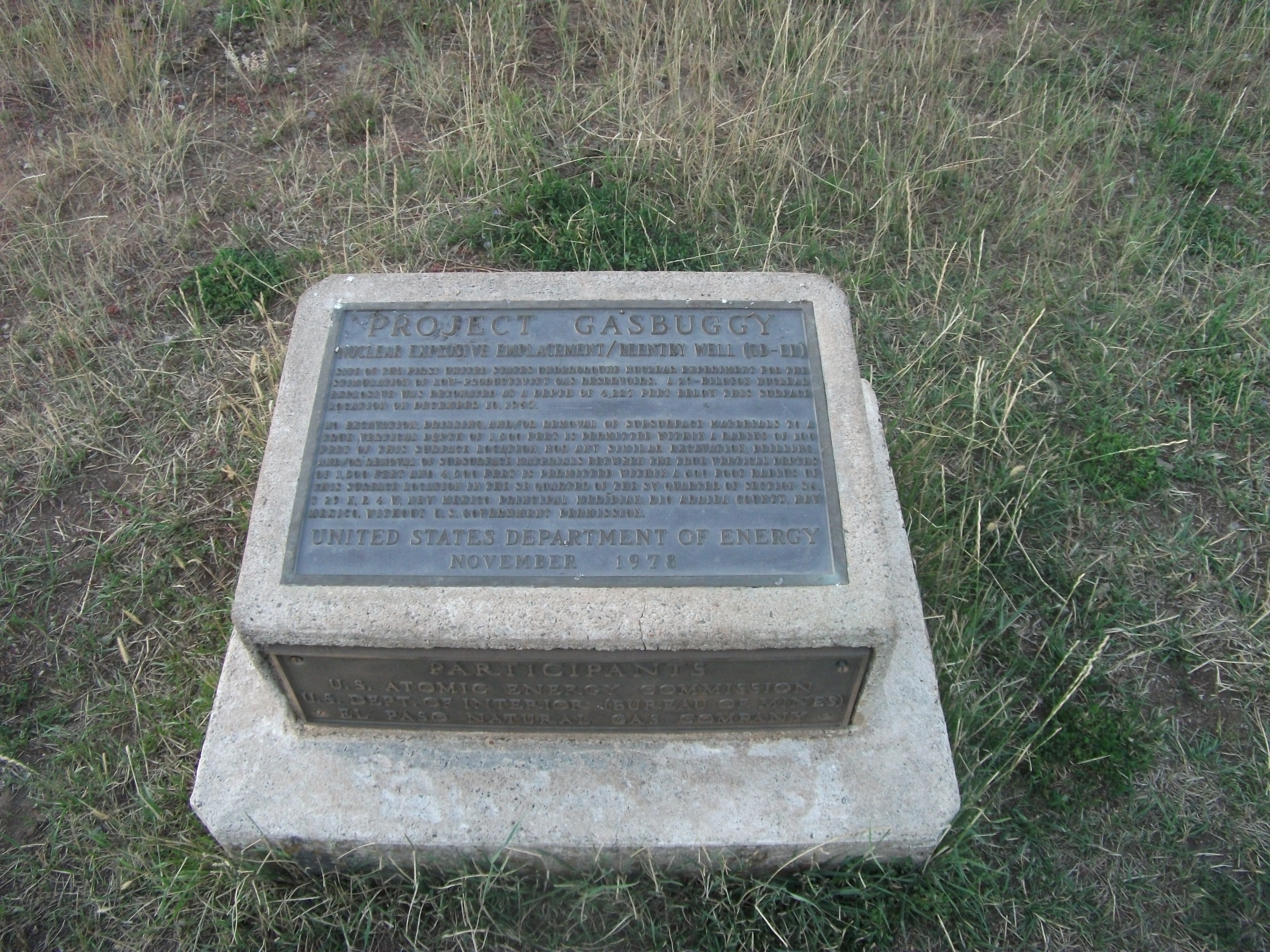
The Project Gasbuggy placard.

Cross-section of the Gasbuggy site.

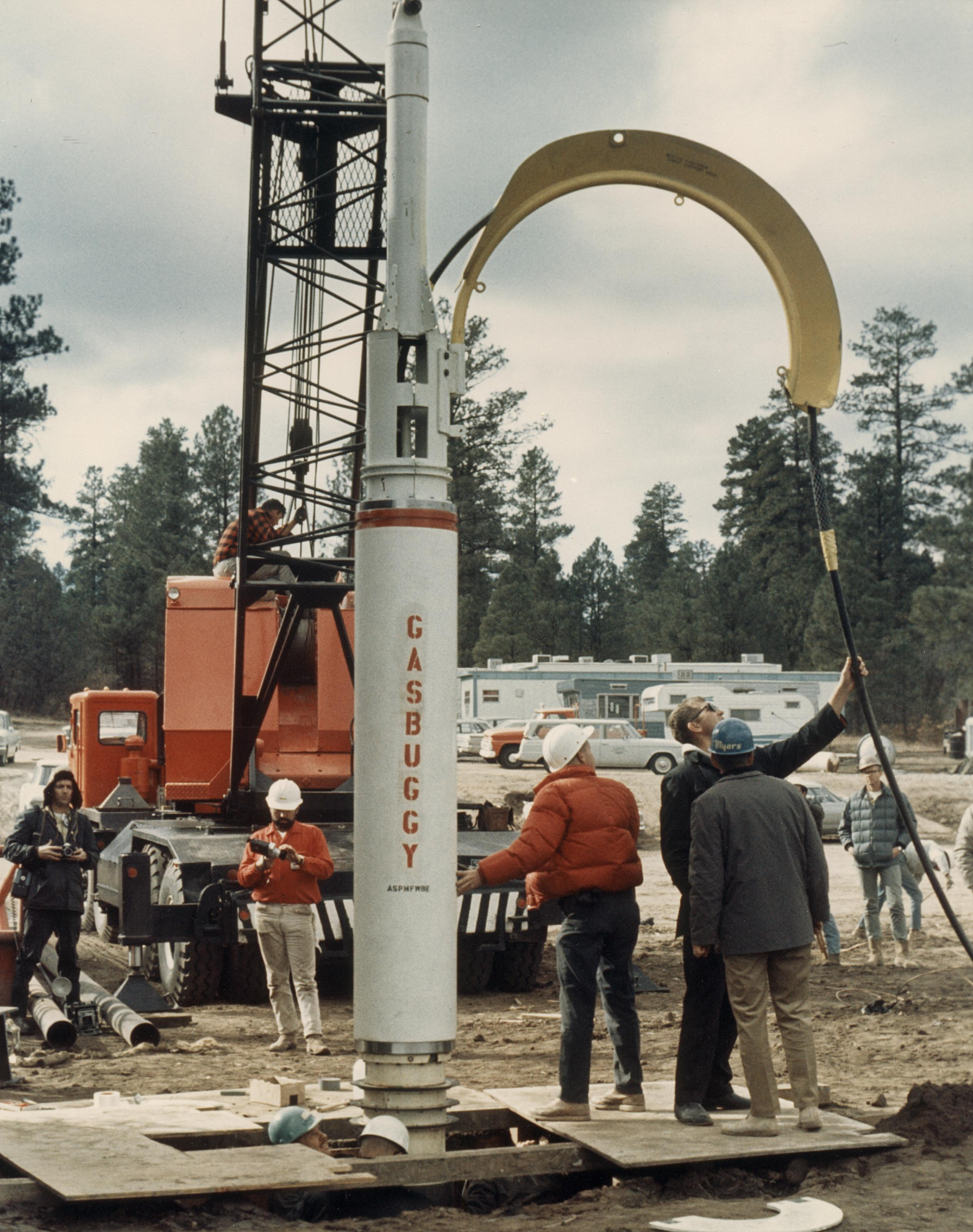
Gasbuggy nuclear device before emplacement.

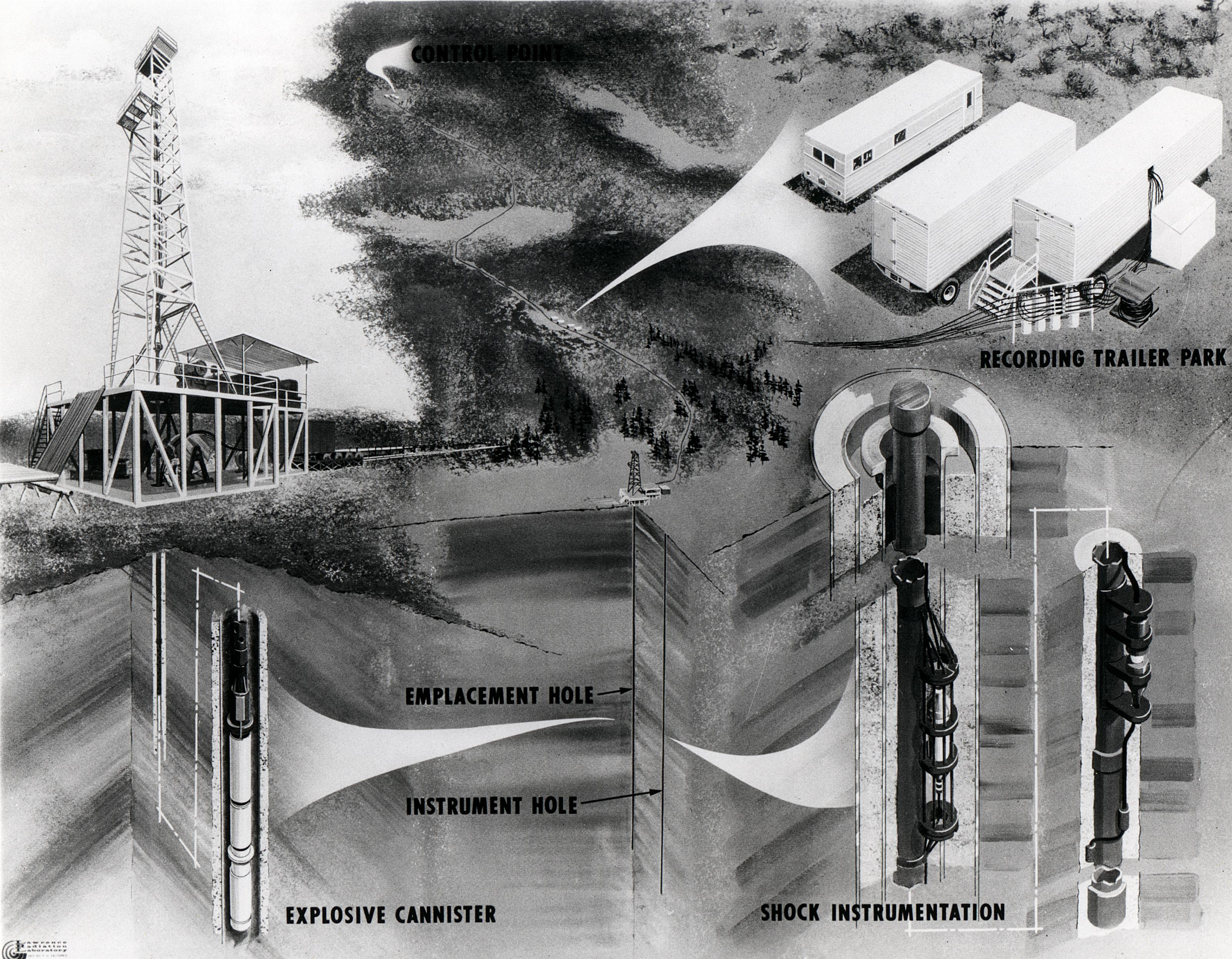
Artists impression of the test setup

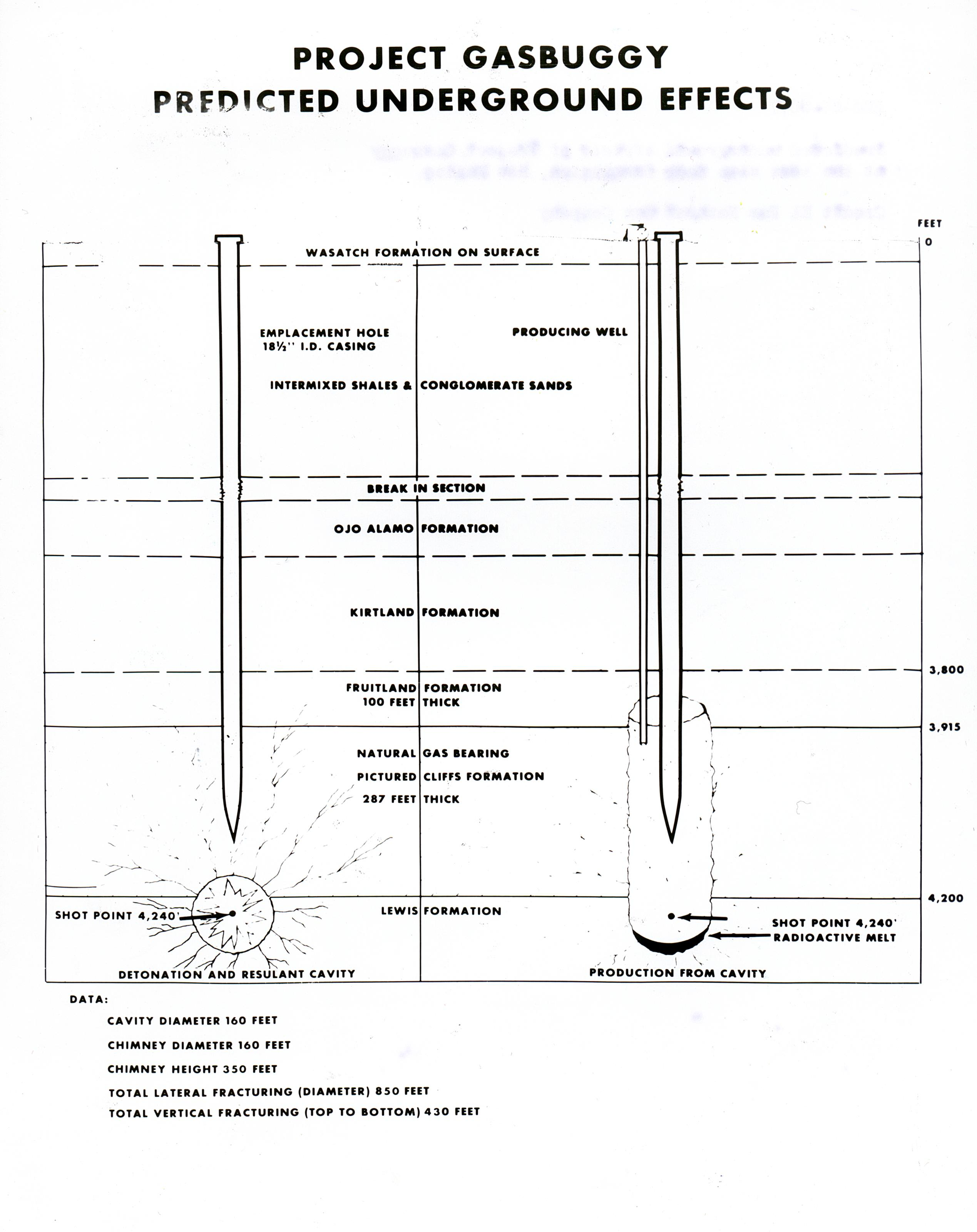
Predicted underground effects

== See also ==
- Project Gnome
- Project Ketch
