= List of ufologists =

This is a list of notable people who are ufologists (people who investigate whether UFOs are linked to extraterrestrial aliens).

== Argentina ==
- Juan Posadas, (1912–1981), Trotskyist theorist who blended together Trotskyism and Ufology. Posadas' version of Trotskyism is regarded as its own strain, and called Posadism.
- Fabio Zerpa, (1928–2019), parapsychologist and UFO researcher.

== Australia ==
- Ross Coulthart, journalist and lawyer, interviewed the UFO whistleblower David Grusch on the US governmental cover-ups of the recovery programs of crashed UFOs.

== Brazil ==
- Ademar José Gevaerd (1962–2022)

== Canada ==
- Paul Hellyer (1923–2021), Canadian Defense Minister.
- Stanton Friedman (1934–2019), U.S. born Canadian ufologist, former nuclear physicist, did early research on Roswell and also MJ-12 documents.

== Estonia ==
- Jüri Lina (b. 1949)
- Igor Volke (1950-2024), ufologist and researcher of environmental anomalies

== France ==
- Jacques Bergier (1912–1978), writer, co-wrote the best-seller The Morning of the Magicians.
- Rémy Chauvin (1913–2009), biologist and entomologist.
- Robert Charroux (1909–1978), writer, promoted the Ancient astronauts theory.
- Aimé Michel (1919–1992), writer and ufologist.
- Jacques Vallée (b. 1939) computer scientist and author, important figure in the UFO studies in France and in the United States. Promoted the extraterrestrial hypothesis and later the interdimensional hypothesis.

== Indonesia ==
- J. Salatun, (1927–2012), pioneer of UFO research in Indonesia.

== Italy ==
- Monsignor Corrado Balducci, (1923–2008), Roman Catholic theologian of the Vatican Curia long time exorcist for the Archdiocese of Rome.

== Mexico ==
- Jaime Maussan (b. 1953), Mexican journalist and ufologist.

== Romania ==
- Dan Apostol, (1957–2013), writer and researcher specialized in several domains.
- Doru Davidovici, (1945–1989), fighter pilot and writer. Author of the best-seller Lumi Galactice – colegii mei din neștiut ("Galactic worlds – my colleagues from the unknown")
- Ion Hobana (1931–2011), science fiction writer, literary critic and ufologist.

== Spain ==
- Iker Jiménez Elizari (b. 1973), journalist born in the Basque city of Vitoria. He's licensed in Sciences of the Information by the Complutensian University of Madrid and the European University of Madrid. His wife, Carmen Porter, is also a journalist and investigator on paranormal activity; both work together in the show Cuarto Milenio, in the TV network Cuatro, and its radio version Milenio 3 in Cadena SER, about paranormal activity, Ufology and other mysteries.

== Switzerland ==
- Billy Meier, (b. 1937)
- Erich von Däniken, (1935–2026), controversial Swiss author best known for his books which examine possible evidence for extraterrestrial influences on early human culture.
- Giorgio A. Tsoukalos, (b. 1978), probably best known for his work on Ancient Aliens and alien memes.

== United Kingdom ==
- Brinsley Trench, (1911–1995), ufologist and a believer in flying saucers, and in particular, the Hollow Earth theory.
- Timothy Good (b. 1942), British researcher and author.
- Graham Hancock (b. 1950), British writer and journalist. He is known for his pseudoscientific theories involving ancient civilisations, Earth changes, stone monuments or megaliths, altered states of consciousness, ancient myths, and astronomical or astrological data from the past.
- George King, (1919–1997) regarded himself as "Primary Terrestrial Mental Channel" for great and evolved extraterrestrial Intelligences.
- Elizabeth Klarer (1910–1984), South African contactee and UFO photographer.
- Nick Pope, (1965-2026), Former head of the UFO desk, Ministry of Defence; author of Operation Thunder Child.
- Jenny Randles (b. 1951), British author and former director of investigations with the British UFO Research Association (BUFORA).
- Nick Redfern (b. 1964), British ufologist/Cryptozoologist now living in Dallas, Texas, US.
- Peter A. Sturrock (1924–2024), British scientist. An emeritus professor of applied physics at Stanford University, much of Sturrock's career has been devoted to astrophysics, plasma physics, and solar physics, but Sturrock is interested in other fields, including ufology, scientific inference, the history of science, and the philosophy of science.
- Colin Wilson (1931–2013), English philosopher and author of Alien Dawn (1999).

== United States ==
- George Adamski 1891–1965), controversial UFO contactee and known hoaxer of the 1950s, wrote several bestselling books about his encounters with friendly "space brothers" from other planets.
- Orfeo Angelucci (aka, Orville Angelucci) (1912–1993), one of the most unusual of the mid-1950s UFO contactees.
- Stephen Bassett (1946), UFO advocate and lobbyist
- Art Bell (birth name: Arthur William Bell, III) (1945–2018), U.S. radio broadcaster and author, known primarily as the founder and longtime host of the paranormal-themed radio program Coast to Coast AM.
- William J. Birnes, American writer, editor, book publisher and literary rights agent. He is best known as an active publisher of UFO literature (UFO Magazine) and is a New York Times bestselling author.
- Jerome Clark (b. 1946), UFO historian, author of the UFO Encyclopedia
- Philip J. Corso (1915–1998), Army Military Intelligence officer, wrote highly disputed book on Roswell incident.
- Robert Dean (1929–2018), ufologist, reportedly read a document called An Assessment (1964), a NATO report on UFOs prompted by an incident on February 2, 1961, during which 50 UFOs allegedly appeared over Europe.
- Tom DeLonge (b. 1975), current singer and guitarist of blink-182 and founder of To the Stars Academy of Arts and Sciences
- Glenn Dennis (1925–2015), founder of the International UFO Museum and Research Center in Roswell, New Mexico, which opened in September 1991. Dennis is a self-professed witness to the Roswell incident (1947).
- Danielle Egnew (b. 1969), American Psychic / Medium and Paranormal Radio, TV and Film host. Contactee who regularly reports on first-hand communication with extraterrestrial species along with detailed physics / design of extraterrestrial propulsion systems.
- Luis Elizondo is an American author, media personality, and UFO disclosure activist who wrote the 2024 book Imminent: Inside the Pentagon's Hunt for UFO's.
- Raymond E. Fowler (b. 1934), long-time UFO investigator, details one of the best multiple witness alien abduction cases on record, author of The Andreasson Affair and The Allagash Abductions.
- Daniel Fry (1908–1992), American contactee who claimed he had multiple contacts with an alien and took a ride in a remotely piloted alien spacecraft on July 4, 1949.
- Steven M. Greer (b. 1955), American physician known as a proponent of openness in government, media and corporations when it comes to advanced technologies that he and others believe to have been shelved and hidden from public awareness for reasons of profit and influence.
- Richard H. Hall (1930–2009), former assistant Director of NICAP in the 1960s, former director of the Fund for UFO Research in the 1980s.
- Charles I. Halt (b. 1939), retired USAF Colonel who was a key figure in the Rendlesham UFO incident in 1980.
- Robert L. Hastings (b. 1950), author and photographer, investigator of UFOs appearances around nuclear facilities.
- Allan Hendry (b. 1950), astronomer, full-time UFO investigator for the Center for UFO Studies in the late 1970s and early 1980s.
- Budd Hopkins (1931–2011), alien abduction researcher.
- J. Allen Hynek (1910–1986), astronomer, consultant to Project Blue Book (USAF). Founded CUFOS (Center for UFO Studies).
- David M. Jacobs (b. 1942), alien abduction researcher.
- Morris K. Jessup (1900–1959), photographer, probably best remembered for his pioneering ufological writings and his role in uncovering the so-called Philadelphia Experiment.
- Leslie Kean, investigative journalist and author who is most notable for books about UFOs and the afterlife.
- John Keel (birth name: Alva John Kiehle) (1930–2009), journalist, investigated the famous Mothman Sightings in West Virginia in 1966 and 1967.
- Donald Keyhoe (1897–1988), aviator and Marine Corps officer, was the leader of NICAP, the largest civilian UFO research group in the U.S., in the 1950s and 1960s.
- Philip J. Klass (1919–2005), senior editor of Aviation Week and Space Technology, leading UFO skeptic/debunker from mid-1960s until his death in 2005.
- George Knapp (b. 1952), American investigative journalist.
- Kevin H. Knuth, associate professor of physics at University at Albany, editor-in-chief of Entropy scientific journal, author of "Estimating Flight Characteristics of Anomalous Unidentified Aerial Vehicles" – scientific paper based on US Navy personnel UFO observations
- Bob Lazar (b. 1959), owner of a mail-order scientific supply company who claims to have worked from 1988 until 1989 at an area called S-4 (Sector Four).
- Avi Loeb (b. 1962), Israeli-American theoretical physicist who works on astrophysics and cosmology, Professor of Science at Harvard University. In 2018, he attracted media attention for suggesting that alien space craft may be in the Solar System, using the anomalous behavior of ʻOumuamua as an example. He also claims that UFO needs serious scientific study, as part of SETI research
- Bruce Maccabee (1942–2024), retired US Navy optical physicist, has analyzed numerous UFO videos and photos.
- John E. Mack (1929–2004), Harvard psychiatrist/professor, alien abduction researcher.
- James E. McDonald (1920–1971), physicist and professor of meteorology at the University of Arizona. Noted critic of the Condon Report.
- Jim Marrs (1943–2017), conspiracy theorist, news reporter, college professor, and author of books and articles on a wide range of assorted conspiracy theories.
- Riley Martin (1946–2015), self-described alien contactee, author, and radio host.
- Donald Howard Menzel (1901–1976), professor of astronomy at Harvard University, leading UFO skeptic of the 1950s and 1960s.
- James W. Moseley (1931–2012), editor of Saucer Smear, long-time observer, author and commentator of the UFO phenomena.
- Linda Moulton Howe (b. 1942), journalist known for investigating cattle mutilations.
- George Noory (b. 1950), broadcaster of the popular "Coast to Coast" radio broadcast; the program discusses paranormal events.
- Curtis Peebles (1955–2017), aerospace historian for the Smithsonian Institution, also a leading UFO skeptic.
- Kevin D. Randle (b. 1949), captain in the US Air Force Reserves; also a leading investigator of the Roswell incident in 1947.
- Edward J. Ruppelt (1923–1960), Air Force captain who supervised Project Blue Book, the Air Force's official study of the UFO phenomenon in the 1950s and 1960s.
- Harley Rutledge (1926–2006), solid-state physicist, Southeast Missouri State University.
- Robert Salas, former U.S. Air Force officer
- Jack Sarfatti (b.1939) PhD physicist (University California degree) See David Kaiser's How the Hippies Saved Physics. Numerous videos on YouTube on UFO time travel physics manipulating spacetime with small amounts of stress-energy density. Alleged NHI contactee in 1953 with conscious AI from the future.
- Robert Sheaffer (b. 1949), member of CSICOP's UFO subcommittee, a leading UFO skeptic/debunker.
- Whitley Strieber (b. 1946), author of Communion, UFO researcher, paranormal phenomena expert, and alleged abductee.
- Leonard H. Stringfield (1920–1994), American ufologist who took particular interest in crashed flying saucer stories.
- Chan Thomas (1920–1998) author on ancient cataclysms who researched purported UFO technology for McDonnell Douglas in the 1960s, and whose ideas went on to influence conspiracy theorists in the 2020s.

== See also ==
- Hermann Oberth (physicist, rocketry pioneer)
- Wernher von Braun
