= Bruce Maccabee =

American physicist and naval officer (1942–2024)

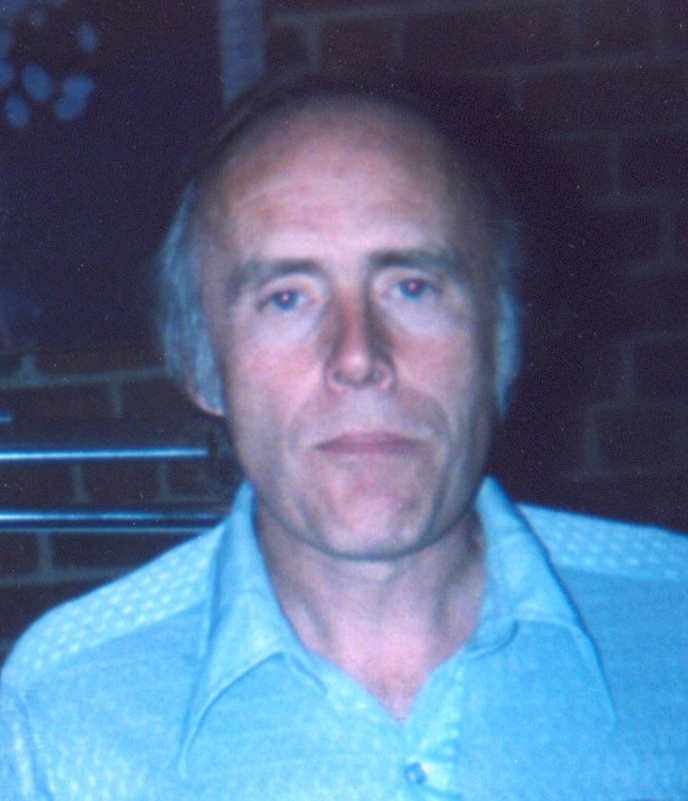
- Maccabee at the 1993 MUFON Symposium
- Born: May 6, 1942; Rutland, Vermont, U.S.
- Died: May 10, 2024 (aged 82); Lima, Ohio, U.S.

Academic background
- Education: Worcester Polytechnic Institute; American University

Bruce S. Maccabee (May 6, 1942 – May 10, 2024) was an American optical physicist employed by the United States Navy, and a ufologist.

== Biography ==
Maccabee received a B.S. in physics at Worcester Polytechnic Institute in Worcester, Massachusetts, and an M.S. and Ph.D. from American University, Washington, D.C. In 1972 he began his career at the Naval Ordnance Laboratory, White Oak, Silver Spring, Maryland; which later became the Naval Surface Warfare Center Dahlgren Division. Maccabee retired from government service in 2008. He has worked on optical data processing, generation of underwater sound with lasers and various aspects of the Strategic Defense Initiative (SDI) and Ballistic Missile Defense (BMD) using high-power lasers.

Maccabee was also a pianist who performed at the 1997 and 1999 MUFON symposia. He lived in Allen County, Ohio, and was married to Jan Maccabee. He died at his home in Lima, Ohio, on May 10, 2024 at the age of 82.

== Ufology ==
Maccabee was interested in unidentified flying objects (UFOs) from the late 1960s when he joined the National Investigations Committee On Aerial Phenomena (NICAP) and was active in research and investigation for NICAP until its dissolution in 1980. He became a member of the Mutual UFO Network (MUFON) in 1975 and was subsequently appointed to the position of state director for Maryland, a position he held until his death. In 1979, he was instrumental in establishing the Fund for UFO Research (FUFOR) and was the chairman for about 13 years. He later served on the National Board of the Fund.

His UFO research and investigations included the Kenneth Arnold sighting of 24 June 1947, the McMinnville photos of 1950, the Gemini 11 astronaut photos of September 1966, the Tehran UFO incident of September 1976, the New Zealand sightings of December 1978, the Japan Airlines (JAL1628) sighting of November 1986, the numerous sightings of the Gulf Breeze UFO incident between 1987 and 1988, the "red bubba" sightings between 1990 and 1992 that also included his own personal sighting in September 1991, the Mexico City video of August 1997 (which he classified as a hoax), the Phoenix Lights sightings of 13 March 1997, the Mexican UFO incident of March 2004, as well as various others.

Maccabee also carried out historical research and was the first to obtain the secret "flying disc file" from the FBI, what he called "the REAL X-Files". In addition, he collected documents from the Central Intelligence Agency, the United States Air Force, the United States Army, and other government agencies.

Maccabee was the author or coauthor of about three dozen technical articles and more than a hundred trade articles about UFOs over the last 30 years, including many which appeared in the MUFON UFO Journal and MUFON Symposium proceedings. Among his papers was a reanalysis of the statistics and results of the famed Battelle Memorial Institute Project Blue Book Special Report No. 14, a massive analysis of 3,200 Air Force cases through the mid-1950s. (See Identification studies of UFOs.) Another was a reanalysis of the results of the Condon Committee UFO study from 1969. (Like many others, Maccabee concluded that Edward Condon lied about the results.)

In addition, he also wrote or contributed to half a dozen books on the subject of UFOs and appeared on numerous radio and television shows and documentaries as an authority on the subject.
