= Leonard H. Stringfield =

American ufologist (1920–1994)

- Born: 1920
- Died: December 18, 1994 (aged 73–74)
- Occupation: Ufologist
- Writing career
- Genre: Ufology

Leonard Stringfield (1920–1994) was an American ufologist who took particular interest in crashed flying saucer stories.

Stringfield was director of Civilian Research, Interplanetary Flying Objects (CRIFO), and published a monthly newsletter, ORBIT. In 1957 he became public relations adviser for the civilian UFO group, National Investigations Committee On Aerial Phenomena (NICAP), under the direction of Donald Keyhoe, a friend since 1953. From 1967 to 1969, Stringfield served as an "Early Warning Coordinator" for the Condon Committee. During the 1970s, he wrote a number of books about alleged recoveries of alien spaceships and alien bodies.

In 1978, Stringfield served as UFO research adviser to Grenada Prime Minister Sir Eric Gairy. Privately, Stringfield worked as Director of Public Relations and Marketing Services for DuBois Chemicals, a division of Chemed Corporation, Cincinnati. He self-published "Status Reports" on alleged UFO "crash-retrievals" until his death. He died of lung cancer December 18, 1994, after long illness.

== Publications ==
- Inside Saucer Post...3-0 Blue: CRIFO Views the Status Quo: A Summary Report (1957)
- Situation Red: The UFO Siege! Foreword by Maj. Donald E. Keyhoe (1977). Doubleday.
- Retrievals of the Third Kind: A Case Study of Alleged UFOs and Occupants in Military Custody (1978). Presented at the Ninth Annual MUFON Symposium in Dayton, Ohio, July 29, 1978.

Unofficially known as Status Report I.

- The UFO Crash/Retrieval Syndrome: Status Report II: New Sources, New Data (1980)
- UFO Crash/Retrievals: Amassing the Evidence: Status Report III (1982)
- The Fatal Encounter at Ft. Dix-McGuire: A Case Study: Status Report IV (1985)
- UFO Crash/Retrievals: Is the Coverup Lid Lifting?: Status Report V (1989)
- UFO Crash/Retrievals: The Inner Sanctum: Status Report VI (1991)
- UFO Crash/Retrievals: Search for Proof in a Hall of Mirrors: Status Report VII (1994)
