= Raymond E. Fowler =

American author and ufologist (born 1933)

- Born: Raymond Eveleth Fowler; November 11, 1933 (age 92); Salem, Massachusetts
- Education: Gordon College
- Occupations: Author and ufologist

Raymond Eveleth Fowler (born November 11, 1933) is an American author and ufologist. His 1979 book The Andreasson Affair is regarded as breaking new ground by introducing the topic of Alien implants to ufology. In 1974, J. Allen Hynek called him "an outstanding UFO investigator and fact-finder." In 2015, New Hampshire magazine described him as "one of the top respected authorities on the subject along with Dr. Jacque Vallee and Dr. Allen Hynek"

== Early life and education ==
Raymond Fowler was born in Salem, Massachusetts on November 11, 1933. After elementary and high school, he enrolled at Gordon College in Wenham, Massachusetts and graduated with a Bachelor of Arts degree, magna cum laude.

== Career ==
Fowler joined the U.S. Air Force in 1952 during the period of the Korean War. After he was discharged, he became a member of the National Investigations Committee on Aerial Phenomena (NICAP) and in his spare time began Investigating UFO cases. In his association with NICAP, he served as Chairman of the Massachusetts Subcommittee. In his capacity as a NICAP representative, he gave illustrated lectures to the public on the topic of UFOs and case investigations.

He was a civilian employee with the United States Air Force Security Service and then employed 25 years with GTE Government Systems, a U.S. defense contractor specializing in defense electronics, telecommunications systems, and information services. It was at the time a division of GTE Corporation.

By 1979, with NICAP nearly defunct (1980), he had switched his primary membership to MUFON and was the Massachusetts State Director for the organization. He was Director of Scientific Investigations for MUFON and authored an early edition of the MUFON Field Investigators Manual.

Also by 1979 he was affiliated with J. Allen Hynek's Center for UFO Studies (CUFOS) as a Scientific Associate. In the Foreword to Fowler's 1974 book "UFOs: Interplanetary Visitors, Hynek wrote of him: "This foreword is primarily a tribute to an outstanding UFO investigator and fact-finder. I know of no one who is more dedicated, trustworthy or persevering than Ray Fowler." Hynek also contributed the Foreword to Fowler's second book, The Andreasson Affair.

Fowler estimated that most UFO sightings can be explained as man-made objects or natural phenomena and only about 10 percent are worthy of investigation.

As an author and ufologist, he has had media appearances on Today, Good Morning America, The Dick Cavett Show (October 26, 1972), Mike Douglas Show (June 12, 1979), Unsolved Mysteries (September 18, 1994), Sightings (April 23, 1995), and numerous radio shows and documentaries.

== UFO research ==
Fowler is best known for his UFO (Unidentified Flying Object) investigations and books focusing primarily on UFO sightings and close encounters in the New England area of the U.S., including the Betty Andreasson Luca Alien Abduction case written about by Fowler in his 1979 book The Andreasson Affair and two follow-up books, The Andreasson Affair - Phase Two (1983) and The Andreasson Legacy (1997). He is credited in the initial work with bringing the topic of alleged alien implants to ufology in the discussion of alien abductions.

On the 50th anniversary of the Andreasson case, the Massachusetts newspaper The Gardner News described it as "one of the nation's most celebrated accounts of an alien abduction"

Fuller was the lead investigator for NICAP on the 1965 Exeter incident investigation. He filed an 18-page report on the nighttime UFO sighting case that involved citizens and police officers witnessing a large object with flashing red lights at tree-top level just south of Exeter, New Hampshire.

Fowler also investigated and wrote about the 1976 Allagash Abductions, an alleged multiple persons abduction case in Maine that occurred along the Allagash Wilderness Waterway, which was cast into doubt by one of the four witnesses in 2016. As in the earlier Andreasson case, Fowler had the four male witnesses undergo regression hypnosis to recall their claimed experiences.

In 1973, Fowler was employed as a civilian program supervisor for an Air Force Minuteman missile program in the Boston area, while also representing NICAP outside of work. During this time he investigated for NICAP reports of UFOs having flown over the restricted airspace of Minuteman missile sites in North Dakota years earlier, intrusions that allegedly caused system malfunctions in the subterranean launch control facilities. Fowler interviewed an unnamed Air Force officer who claimed that on August 25, 1966, operators in the underground facilities observed on their screens unidentified objects moving above the base. When asked about these claims by the press, an Air Force spokesman responded that "the Strategic Air Command which operates the site could find nothing in its unit histories to confirm the presence of unidentified flying objects over it or indeed malfunctions in its equipment on the date mentioned".

== Reception ==
Frank Sikora of The Birmingham News wrote in his review of Fowler's book UFOs: Interplanetary Visitors that "UFO buffs – and those who have a casual interest in the possibility that creatures from other planets may be vising our earth – will find this just what they've been waiting for."

Evalyne C. Robinson of the Daily Press in a review of Fowler's book The Watchers wrote that "though extensively researched and documented, The Watchers is a strange book, necessarily so, because as Whitley Strieber author of Communion warns in his foreword: 'If aliens are actually here, we can expect them to be .. stranger than anything we can possibly imagine.'"

Dorothy I. Grosser of the Asbury Park Press wrote in her review that The Andreasson Affair by Raymond E. Fowler "will inevitably evoke pro and con opinions" on "the subject of unidentified flying objects and close encounters."

The Canadian newspaper The Ottawa Journal in a review called the events in The Andreasson Affair "disturbing" and concluded "the effect on unstable UFO cultists may be enormous."

Psychiatrist Ernest H. Taves in a review of Fowler's 1979 book The Andreasson Affair in the Winter 1979–1980 issue of Skeptical Inquirer accused Fowler of an "attempt to inject mystery into a situation where there is none" and that, in Taves' view, "Betty recalled, or relived, in hypnosis, a dream or fantasy (or a number of them) that had meaning and utility in terms of her life history and her emotional needs." Taves concluded his review by saying that the investigation was "flawed throughout by a failure to ask obvious questions" and "as a serious investigation into an unusual happening The Andreasson Affair is a failure."

Psychologist Robert A. Baker, in Skeptical Inquirer in 1988 in a review of Philip J. Klass's 1988 book UFO-Abductions: A Dangerous Game, wrote about Andreasson's alien abduction claims as they were presented in Fowler's 1979 book. Baker: "Written by Raymond Fowler, the book tells how Andreasson, a Massachusetts mother of seven, was kidnapped only a few months after the Betty and Barney Hill case broke but waited seven years before going public herself. Klass shows, in a careful analysis of the regressive-hypnosis material and the other facts surrounding the case, that several parts of Andreasson's story were indisputably 'pure fantasy.' He [Klass] concludes: 'If any part of Andreasson's story is inventive fantasy, the entire incident must be suspect.'"

Skeptic Robert Sheaffer in Skeptical Inquirer in 2007 wrote in his column Psychic Vibrations that "In the world of UFO abductions, the Betty Andreasson case ranks among the most prominent and most esteemed, often discussed in the same reverenced tones as the case of 'abduction' pioneers Betty and Barney Hill." He added that Fowler's 1979 book is the "best-known account of this abduction story," but due to the hypnosis used to allegedly recover Andreasson's memories, the large body of ufological data collected on the case is dubious.

== Abduction ==
Later in life, Fowler wrote about being an abductee himself sharing this information, most in-depth, in his autobiographical book UFO Testament: Anatomy of an Abductee. During an interview with Rosemary Ellen Guiley Fowler listed some of his abduction experiences that seem to mimic other abductee testimony such as Betty and Barney Hill abduction and Betty Andreasson Luca.

Fowler's claim of being an abductee, and his UFO research as a whole, were not always welcome by his family members, because of their religious beliefs on the subject of UFOs. Fowler's extensive investigations in the UFO field lessened after the publication of The Watchers I and The Watchers II, in which Fowler initially acknowledged his UFO abduction experiences. He continued writing books on the subject, however, including his own experiences as well as local investigations he had not previously published.

== Personal life ==
Born in Salem, Massachusetts in 1933, Fowler has also lived in Wenham, Massachusetts, and Kennebunk, Maine. An amateur astronomer, in Wenham, he built and operated an observatory from 1970 to 2001 that he named the Woodside Planetarium & Observatory. Before his retirement, he taught classes on the paranormal in association with the Kennebunk Adult Education Department. A bass instrument soloist, he also performed with his wife Margaret to benefit a local food bank. He has four children.

== Books ==
- UFOs: Interplanetary Visitors, 1974, 2001 (foreword by J. Allen Hynek)
- The Andreasson Affair, 1979, 2014 (foreword by J. Allen Hynek)
- Casebook of a UFO Investigator, 1981
- The Melchizedek Connection, 1981, 2001
- The Andreasson Affair - Phase Two, 1983
- The Watchers, 1990 (foreword by Whitley Strieber)
- The Allagash Abductions, 1993, 2005 (introduction by Budd Hopkins)
- The Watchers II, 1995 (foreword by Whitley Strieber)
- The Andreasson Legacy, 1997
- UFO Testament: Anatomy of an Abductee, 2002
- SynchroFile: Amazing Personal Encounters With Synchronicity And Other Strange Phenomena, 2004

== See also ==
- Alien abduction
- Alien implants
- Exeter incident
- List of ufologists
- Travis Walton incident
