= Juhan af Grann =

Finnish film director and producer (1944–2023)

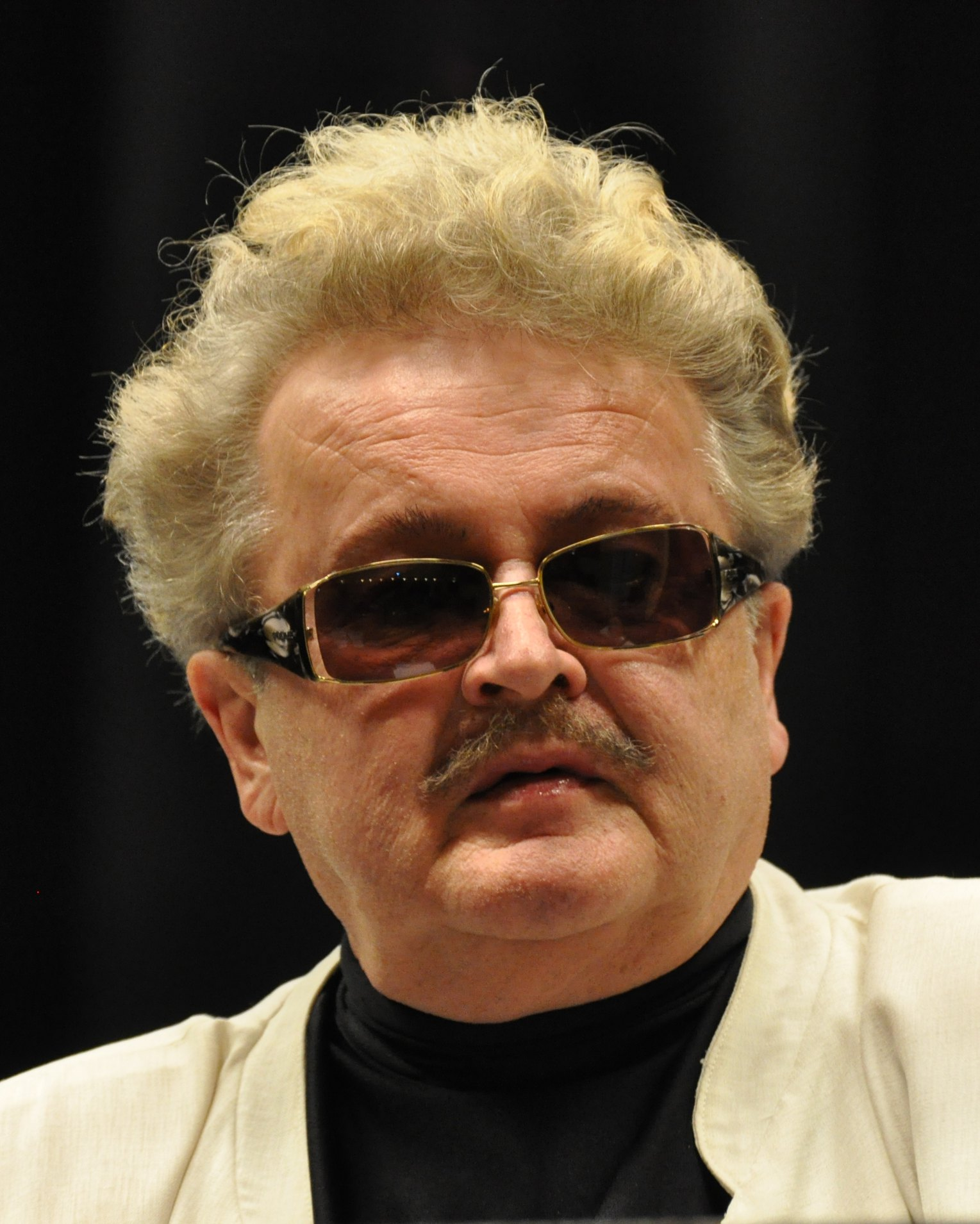
- Juhan af Grann in 2012.
- Born: Heikki Juhani Grann; 3 December 1944; Kuopio, Finland
- Died: 14 January 2023 (aged 78); Espoo, Finland
- Occupations: film director, producer
- Website: personal.inet.fi/business/grann/www/thejag.com/

Juhan af Grann (3 December 1944 – 14 January 2023) was a Finnish film director and producer known for his UFO documentaries. His most notable documentary is Mankind's Last Exodus, released in 1998 and sold in over 120 countries.

Grann is noted for his interest in the topic of unidentified flying objects, but he is also known for outlandish promotion.

== Filmography ==
=== Director ===
- Kun maailma paloi (1969)
- Ihminen tundrassa (1972)
- UKK – Luova valtiomies (1975)
- Luonnon luomaa (1977)
- A la Finlandia (1985)
- Visitors from Space (1992)
- UFOs & Paranormal Phenomena (1995)
- The New Apocalypse – Mankind's Last Exodus (1998)
- Intruders - They Have Always Been Here and Somebody Knows This Secret (2002)

=== Writer ===
- Ihminen tundrassa (1972)
- Luonnon luomaa (1977)
- Visitors from Space (1992)
- UFOs & Paranormal Phenomena (1995)
- The New Apocalypse: Mankind's Last Exodus (1998)
- Intruders: They Have Always Been Here and Somebody Knows This Secret (2002)

=== Producer ===
- Visitors from Space (1992)
- UFOs & Paranormal Phenomena (1995)
- The New Apocalypse: Mankind's Last Exodus (1998)
- Intruders: They Have Always Been Here and Somebody Knows This Secret (2002)

== Selected Film Content ==
Program	Released	Subjects/Interviewees	Topics
Visitors from Space	1992	Stanton Friedman, George Adamski, Billy Meier, Budd Hopkins, Barney & Betty Hill, Rauni-Leena Luukanen-Kilde	Roswell, Majestic 12, 1957 Antonio Vilas-Boas Abduction, 1969 Finnish Air Force UFO sighting, 1973 Pascagoula Abduction, 1980 Cash-Landrum Incident, 1981 Trans-en-Provence Case, 1986 Japan Airlines Cargo Flight 1628 Incident, 1989 Voronezh UFO Incident, crop circles, The Hessdalen Lights
The New Apocalypse: Mankind’s Last Exodus	1998	Barry Chamish, Budd Hopkins, Ed Dames, Ervin László, Fred Alan Wolf, James Harder, John E. Mack, Robert O. Dean, Travis Walton, Zecharia Sitchin	abductions, astrology, clairvoyance, Earth changes, End Times, Fatima, Yitzhak Rabin assassination, Mark of the Beast, Nostradamus, New World Order, Philadelphia Experiment, Nordic aliens, pole shift, pyramid crystals, Book of Revelation, Roswell, stigmata, Time Travel, Immanuel Velikovsky
Tunkeilijat (aka Intruders: They Have Always Been Here and Somebody Knows This Secret)	2002	Bernhard Haisch, Brian O’Leary, Budd Hopkins, Ed Dames, Ervin László, Eugene Mallove, James Harder, Kenn Thomas, Lloyd Pye, Peter Sturrock, Robert O. Dean, Stanton T Friedman, Steven M. Greer	UFOs, SETI, pole shift, extraterrestrial life, abductions, alien implants, Majestic 12, Roswell, John F. Kennedy assassination, GEC-Marconi scientist deaths, cattle mutilations, Nordic aliens, remote viewing, Ingo Swann, 1947 Maury Island Incident, Area 51, cold fusion
