= The Greatest Story Never Told (disambiguation) =

The Greatest Story Never Told is a 2011 album by rapper Saigon.

The Greatest Story Never Told may also refer to:

- Tuberculosis: The Greatest Story Never Told, a 1992 book by Frank Ryan; see History of tuberculosis § Books
- Greatest Story Never Told, a 1997 documentary by Robert Orel Dean
- The Greatest Story Never Told, a 2004 album by rapper Shyheim
- "The Greatest Story Never Told" (Justice League Unlimited), a 2004 episode of Justice League Unlimited
- "The Greatest Story Never Told", a song by folk musician John McCutcheon
- "The Greatest Story Never Told", soundtrack by Murray Gold; see Doctor Who series 4 § Soundtrack

== See also ==
- The Greatest Story Ever Told (disambiguation)
