= Bill Chalker =

Australian author and UFO researcher

Bill Chalker is an Australian author and UFO researcher. He is a contributing editor for the International UFO Reporter and has been the Australian representative for the Aerial Phenomena Research Organisation (1978 to 1986) and a New South Wales state representative for the Mutual UFO Network (1976 to 1993).

== Biography ==
Chalker was born in Grafton, New South Wales in 1952. He studied at the University of New England, receiving a degree in chemistry and mathematics.

== Bibliography ==
- Bill Chalker (1 January 1996). The Oz Files: The Australian UFO Story. Duffy and Snellgrove. ISBN 978-1-875989-04-1.
- Bill Chalker (19 August 2005). Hair of the Alien: DNA and Other Forensic Evidence of Alien Abductions. Pocket Books. ISBN 978-1-4165-1024-6.
