= Harley Rutledge =

American physicist and ufologist (1926–2006)

Harley D. Rutledge
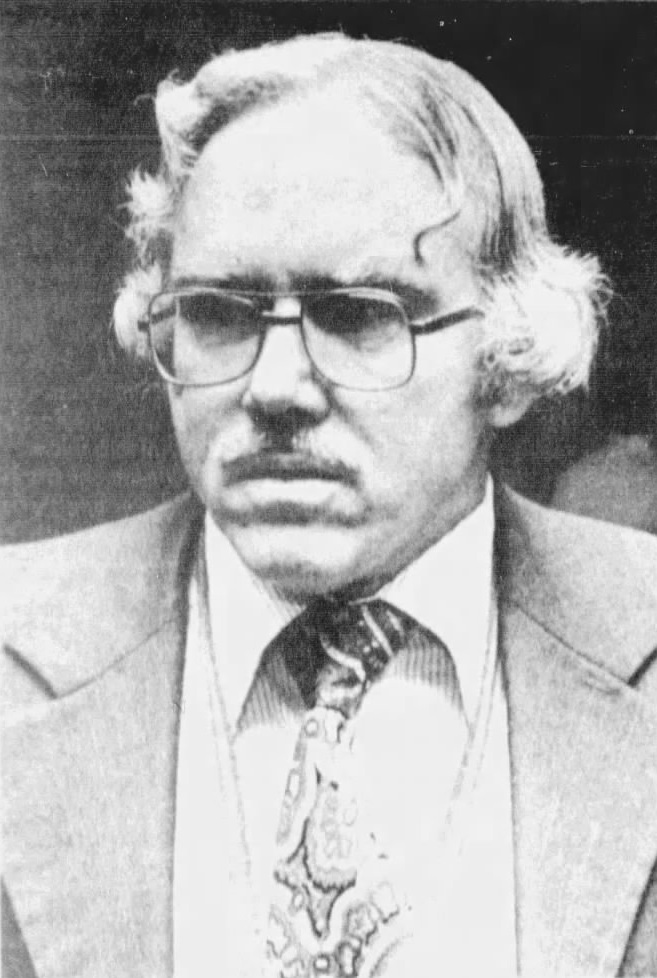
- Rutledge in 1976, during Project Identification
- Born: January 10, 1926; Omaha, Nebraska
- Died: June 5, 2006 (aged 80); Missouri Veterans Home, Cape Girardeau, Missouri
- Spouse: Ruth Lootens (m. 1954)
- Children: 5, including Mark
- Parent(s): Earl Rutledge; Irene Hoagland Rutledge

Academic background
- Education: University of Missouri (Ph.D.)

Academic work
- Discipline: Physics
- Sub-discipline: Solid-state physics
- Institutions: Southeast Missouri State University (professor and department chair)

Harley D. Rutledge (January 10, 1926 – June 5, 2006) was an American physicist and ufologist. He earned a doctorate in solid-state physics from the University of Missouri and spent nearly two decades as chair of the physics department at Southeast Missouri State University. In the 1970s Rutledge directed Project Identification, a long-term field investigation of unidentified aerial phenomena in Missouri that was reported as the first sustained scientific study of UFOs. The project involved trained observers and technical instruments, and his findings were published in the 1981 book Project Identification: The First Scientific Study of UFO Phenomena. Though widely recognized as a UFO expert and frequent media commentator, Rutledge emphasized that many sightings had conventional explanations.

== Life and career ==
Harley D. Rutledge was born in 1926 to Earl and Irene Hoagland Rutledge in Omaha, Nebraska. The Daily Nonpareil identified him as a native of southwest Iowa. He attended high school in Red Oak, Henderson, Macedonia, and Wales-Lincoln, Iowa. Rutledge served in the United States Army from March 16, 1944, to May 3, 1946. In 1954 he married Ruth Lootens at Taos, Missouri. They had five children, including a son, Mark. Rutledge was also active as a softball pitcher and bridge player.

Rutledge joined the physics department at Southeast Missouri State University in 1963. In 1966, he completed his Ph.D. in solid-state physics at the University of Missouri, and subsequently became professor and chairman of the Southeast physics department. He remained chair for 18 years as of 1988. Rutledge retired from teaching in 1992.

In addition to his university post, Rutledge served as president of the Missouri Academy of Science, Mathematics and Computing. He was also a longtime member of the Southeast Missouri Astronomy Club.

Rutledge died on June 5, 2006, at the Missouri Veterans Home, aged 80.

== UFO research ==
The Nonpareil and other newspapers described Rutledge as "an expert, appearing on numerous television and radio interviews and delivering papers to scientific bodies around the world". Challenged to explain sightings of unidentified lights and luminous phenomena in the sky around Piedmont, Missouri, Rutledge decided to subject these reports to scientific analysis. He organized a team of observers with college training in the physical sciences and assembled a wide range of equipment, including electromagnetic spectrum analyzers, Questar telescopes, low- and high-frequency audio detectors, cameras, and a galvanometer to measure variations in the Earth's gravitational field. Oxford University later invited him to present his UFO findings.

Of the UFO situation in Piedmont, Rutledge was quoted in 1977 by the St. Louis Post-Dispatch: "I didn't like the way the Piedmonters were being treated by the media, and I was disturbed that some of the people there were truly frightened." He framed his initial interest as humanitarian, telling the Nonpareil that he was motivated by how frightened retirees were at a rest home, and that women had begun arming themselves in response to strange theories spread by "pseudo scientists" at the time. The St. Joseph News-Press reported that Rutledge entered the investigation as a skeptic. He was also described as caring only about what "his data says".

Project Identification commenced in April 1973, logging several hundred hours of observation time. The Kansas City Times and other contemporary reporting noted that Rutledge applied scientific scrutiny and standards to his UFO studies. It was described as the first scientific field study of UFOs conducted in real time, enabling Rutledge to calculate the objects' speed, course, position, distance, and size. With Drake Kambitch, a pilot and physics major at Southeast, and later other members of a growing team, the group searched for locations from the air every weekend and conducted field research in the area. Rutledge said he first observed a UFO on May 11, 1973, while flying in a Cessna airplane with colleagues during an investigation. He told the Times that he began the project as a skeptic but became convinced of the need for scientific research on the subject. The research team received financial support, including a $2,000 grant from the St. Louis Globe-Democrat.

At Southeast, Rutledge taught a course on identified objects in the sky. He stated that many UFOs could be explained as normal aircraft or atmospheric conditions. By 1977, Rutledge reported having seen more than 140 UFOs, a number he placed at 163 sightings by 1988. He discounted the likelihood of some UFOs being "hoaxes," arguing that only a government could afford the related expenses.

Rutledge was notably uncomfortable in his UFO-related role. He reported becoming depressed for several weeks after his first observation of a UFO, and believed he would be "ridiculed" and "ostracized" by colleagues as a result. According to the Enterprise-Courier of Missouri, he felt the term "UFO" carried "connotations of sensationalism". Rutledge refused to accept a UFO sighting as valid unless he observed it himself. He emphasized that he did not advocate or believe in ideas such as the extraterrestrial UFO hypothesis. "I don't have the facts to prove that," he said. "Once I am known as an extraterrestrial believer, I will have to defend that for the rest of my life." According to the Daily American Republic in 2011, his son Mark stated that his father never shared a conclusion of his theories before his death. "He wouldn't answer that question," Mark said, adding, "Scientists are not going to draw conclusions on things data won't support."

== Books ==
- Project Identification: The First Scientific Study of UFO Phenomena. Englewood Cliffs, N.J.: Prentice-Hall, 1981. ISBN 0-13-730713-6.

== Research papers ==
- "Project Identification: Thirteen Years and One Hundred and Sixty Sightings Later." Presented at the 1986 MUFON Symposium by Harley D. Rutledge, Ph.D.
