= Grann =

Grann is a surname. Notable people with the surname include:

- David Grann (born 1967), American journalist
- Juhan af Grann (1944–2023), Finnish film director and producer
- Phyllis E. Grann (born 1937), British-born American book editor and publishing executive
