= Richard H. Hall =

Author and ufologist

Richard H. Hall (December 25, 1930 – July 17, 2009) was a ufologist and proponent of the extraterrestrial hypothesis to explain UFO sightings. A member of the Authors Guild, he also wrote numerous books and magazine articles dealing with the role of women in the American Civil War.

== Biography ==
Hall was born on December 25, 1930, and had a bachelor's degree in philosophy from Tulane University in New Orleans. He lived most of his life in the Washington, D.C. area. John B. Carlson, an astronomer at the University of Maryland, called Hall "the dean of ufology" and "the last of a breed...[he represented] a generation of UFO enthusiasts who approached questions of the universe using the scientific method...he was scientific, careful...a researcher." According to Carlson, Hall also rejected what he called "the ding-a-ling fringe [of ufology]...who approach this more as a belief system or a faith" than a scientific endeavor.

Between 1958 & 1969, Hall worked for the National Investigations Committee on Aerial Phenomena (NICAP). He began as executive secretary, and eventually became NICAP's assistant director. In this role Hall was both an eyewitness and participant to much of the early history of the UFO phenomenon in the United States. Working with NICAP director Donald Keyhoe, he helped lobby the United States Congress to hold public hearings and investigations into the UFO phenomenon. In 1964 Hall researched, edited, and wrote much of The UFO Evidence, a compendium of UFO incidents from the 1940s, 1950s, and early 1960s that NICAP considered to be the most persuasive for the belief that UFOs were a "real", physical phenomenon. A copy of The UFO Evidence was sent to every member of Congress in 1964.

Following Keyhoe's ouster as NICAP director in 1969, Hall left NICAP to work as a technical writer and editor. He continued to investigate UFOs. He served as the director of the Fund for UFO Research, which provided grant money to researchers investigating UFOs. He was also the editor of the MUFON Journal, the official publication of the Mutual UFO Network (MUFON), the largest civilian UFO interest group in America today. In 2001 he wrote a sequel to The UFO Evidence; it covered prominent UFO incidents from the mid-1960s through the 1990s. He was also the founder and chief editor of the now-defunct Journal of UFO History, which featured articles on the history and growth of the UFO phenomenon in the United States. Hall was a vocal proponent of the theory that UFOs are extraterrestrial spacecraft from an advanced alien civilization, and he was an active member of the now-defunct "UFO Updates" message board and website.

In 1964, "high level White House discussions on what to do if an alien intelligence was discovered in space" took place. As a result, CIA director John McCone initiated a review of the possibility that UFOs might represent a threat to the United States. CIA agents interviewed Richard Hall, who provided them with data about UFA sightings from NICAP's records.

In 1997, the CIA released a report called CIA's role in the study of U.F.O.'s 1947-90 by Gerald K. Haines, which admitted that the agency had routinely lied about the causes of UFO reports for decades, blaming the incidents on weather conditions such as "temperature inversions" or "ice crystals". Instead these sightings were of secret aircraft, such as the SR-71 or U-2 spy planes.

Pulitzer Prize winning science writer William J. Broad wrote about the release of the report in The New York Times, quoting Hall:

"It's very significant," said Richard Hall, chairman of the Fund for U.F.O. Research, a group in Washington. "Certainly they've lied about not having any interest in the subject. But I don't know of any other deception like this."

John E. Pike, head of space policy at the Federation of American Scientists, also based in Washington, said the admission raised questions about other Federal cover-ups involving U.F.O.'s. "The flying-saucer community is definitely onto something," in charging that the military is hiding something, Mr. Pike said.

According to Broad, Pike and other aerospace experts accepted much of the government's explanation of the earlier deceptions, while Hall continued to believe that the government was covering up evidence of the extraterrestrial origins of UFOs.

To supplement his income as a UFO researcher, Hall worked for many years as an abstractor-indexer for the Congressional Information Service in Bethesda, Maryland, and he did similar work for the National Institute on Alcohol Abuse and Alcoholism, Columbia Telecommunications and the National Council on Aging. Hall also wrote numerous books and magazine articles dealing with the role of women in the American Civil War, and he maintained a strong interest in Civil War history through his life.
