= Chan Thomas =

American ufologist and writer

Chan Thomas (1920–1998) was an American engineer, ufologist, writer on ancient cataclysms, and self-proclaimed polymath whose ideas have influenced conspiracy theorists in the 21st century.

== Career ==
In 1963, he published the book The Adam and Eve Story which interpreted the Book of Genesis, several pre-Biblical legends, and historical geological phenomena to make the pseudoscientific claim that the Earth has routinely been hit by cataclysmic events every 5,600 years. These alleged cataclysms involved the Earth's poles switching place, causing earthquakes, tsunamis and supersonic winds to wipe out entire civilizations. Thomas claimed that another such event was on the horizon.

The book also claimed that Jesus Christ was a scholar who lived among tribes in what is now the Indian state of Nagaland, and that he was taken away by aliens after his crucifixion.

In 1967, aerospace company McDonnell Douglas assembled a small team of researchers to investigate reports of UFOs with the goal of discovering the underlying science that powered such vehicles. Thomas was reportedly one of four full-time researchers on the team. The team's director, aeronautical engineer Robert M. Wood, wrote some four decades later in a newsletter for MUFON that Thomas had a "tremendously innovative mind" and "was a total 'out of the box' thinker."

Thomas also claimed to have ESP, having written a handbook on the topic, and said he had made contact with extraterrestrial life. James Randi criticized Thomas' prediction that Los Angeles would succumb to a future catastrophe, noting that Thomas was careful to place his disaster "between the year 2000 and 2500. He was able to assume that he would be safely in his grave by then and unavailable for comment."

The CIA declassified documents in 2013 that included large excerpts from Thomas' book The Adam and Eve Story. In subsequent years, the book's claims were repeated by conspiracy theorists in numerous viral TikTok videos. One conspiracy theorist also recounted the book's claims on the Joe Rogan Experience podcast. Media Matters for America concluded that this trend was part of a wider framing of climate change as an inevitable catastrophe that is beyond the control of humanity, which it considers to be a form of climate change denial.
