= The Greatest Story Ever Told (disambiguation) =

The Greatest Story Ever Told is a 1965 film based on

- The Greatest Story Ever Told, a 1949 novel by Fulton Oursler, in turn based on
  - The Greatest Story Ever Told (radio program), a 1947–1956 series inspired by the Gospels

The Greatest Story Ever Told may also refer to:

- The Greatest Story Ever Told (Balaam and the Angel album), 1986
- The Greatest Story Ever Told (The Lawrence Arms album), 2003
- The Greatest Story Ever Told (David Banner album), 2008
- "Greatest Story Ever Told", a song on Bob Weir's 1972 album Ace
- "The Greatest Story Ever Told", a song on Five Iron Frenzy's 2000 album All the Hype That Money Can Buy
- "The Greatest Story Ever Told" (Aqua Teen Hunger Force Forever), the final episode of Aqua Teen Hunger Force
- The Greatest Story Ever Told—So Far: Why Are We Here?, a 2017 book by Lawrence M. Krauss
- Sholay, a 1975 Indian film, marketed under the tagline "The Greatest Story Ever Told"

== Similar ==
- The Greatest Story Never Told (disambiguation)
- The Greatest Story Ever Sold (disambiguation)
