= Robert Dean (ufologist) =

American ufologist (1929–2018)

- Born: Robert Orel Dean; March 2, 1929
- Died: October 11, 2018 (aged 89)
- Education: Indiana University
- Occupations: Ufologist
- Organization: MUFON

Robert Orel Dean (March 2, 1929 – October 11, 2018) was an American ufologist from Tucson, Arizona.

Dean retired from the U.S. Army as a Command Sergeant Major after a 28-year career. He appeared on radio programs, TV documentaries and at conferences discussing the subject of unidentified flying objects (UFOs) and a government cover-up of alien visitations to Earth. Dean claimed to have viewed a classified government document called "The Assessment" that allegedly discussed threats posed by alien activity on Earth, and concluded that no such threats existed. Dean said he considers himself a professional UFO researcher and had "Cosmic Top Secret" clearance while in the military. In 1992, while employed as emergency services coordinator for Pima County, Arizona, Dean sued his employer for discrimination, saying he was treated unfairly because of his belief in UFOs, and because of his age, reportedly settling for $100,000.

== See also ==
- List of ufologists
- UFO conspiracy theories

== Bibliography ==
- Greatest Story Never Told (video), Margana Anagram Production, 1997 (author/host)
- UFO - Cosmic Top Secret (video), Visual Corporation Ltd, 1996, ASIN: B000057YNB (presenter)
- The UFO Anthology CD-ROM, Dreamland Interactive, 1998, ISBN 978-0-9669651-0-0 (host)
- Secrets from the Underground - Hybrid 101 Vol 6: Military Coverup & Hybrids, Alien Secrets, 2007, ASIN: B000TRILM8 (DVD interview with Robert O. Dean)
