= The Greatest Story Ever Sold =

The Greatest Story Ever Sold may refer to:

- The Christ Conspiracy: The Greatest Story Ever Sold, a 1999 book on the historicity of Jesus by Acharya S (Dorothy M. Murdock)
- The Greatest Story Ever Sold: The Decline and Fall of Truth from 9/11 to Katrina a 2006 book by Frank Rich

== See also ==
- POM Wonderful Presents: The Greatest Movie Ever Sold, a movie by Morgan Spurlock
- The Greatest Story Ever Told (disambiguation)
