= Fund for UFO Research =

Fund for UFO Research (FUFOR)
- Formation: 1979
- Location: Mount Rainier, Maryland, United States
- Website: www.fufor.com

The Fund for UFO Research (FUFOR) was a non-profit UFO research group based in Mount Rainier, Maryland. Founded in 1979, FUFOR stated its goal was to further the scholarly research of UFOs and the extraterrestrial hypothesis (ETH), and to secure the release of alleged classified U.S. government documents pertaining to these. Since 2011, the Fund for UFO Research has not had any active presence on the internet or in print.

According to its promotional material, from its founding in 1979 through 2006, FUFOR provided over $700,000 in research grants, and supported numerous UFO-related investigations, including investigations into the secrecy behind the MJ-12 papers and the US Air Force's Project Blue Book. In 1980 FUFOR director Bruce Maccabee represented the organization as a panel member of The Smithsonian's "Symposium on UFOs". In 1996 FUFOR director Don Berliner filmed a cameo role as himself for an episode of The X-Files.

== FUFOR Directors ==
- 1979-1993: Bruce Maccabee
- 1993-1997: Richard H. Hall
- 1998–?: Don Berliner
