= Balaam and the Angel =

British rock band

- Origin: Cannock, Staffordshire, England
- Genres: Rock, gothic rock, glam metal, hard rock
- Years active: 1983–1989, 1991–present
- Label: Virgin
- Members: Mark Morris; Jim Morris; Des Morris
- Past members: Ian McKean Dom Roche Chris P Notes
- Website: Balaam and the Angel Official website

Balaam and the Angel are a rock band founded by Mark, James (Jim), and Desmond (Des) Morris in Cannock, England in 1984.

== Career ==
As children in Motherwell, Scotland, the Morris brothers worked in the entertainment industry as part of a cabaret act. They moved south to Cannock, Staffordshire, England, where they formed Balaam and the Angel.

Initially the band self-released a series of EPs and an album entitled Sun Family via their own Chapter 22 record label and played some tour dates opening for The Cult. This caught the attention of Virgin Records, who signed them and released their debut album, The Greatest Story Ever Told. It peaked at No. 67 in the UK Albums Chart in August 1986. They toured in the United States with Kiss and label mate Iggy Pop.

A second guitarist and the first non-sibling, Ian McKean of Twenty Flight Rockers, was added to the band in 1988. The band began to move away from gothic rock music styles into a sound that had more in common with hard rock. With their new-found style, they recorded the album Live Free or Die. This was soon followed up in similar style when they recorded Days of Madness, before leaving Virgin Records.

== Members ==
- Mark Morris - vocals, bass (1983–1989, 1991–present)
- Jim Morris - guitar, vocals, keyboards (1983–1989, 1991–present)
- Des Morris - drums (1983–1989, 1991–present)
- Karen Morris - keyboards (2019–present)
- Chris P Notes (Chris Williams) - keyboards (1994–2019)
- Ian McKean - guitar (1988–1989, 1991–1994)

== Discography ==
=== Albums ===
Release date	Title
1985	Sun Family (Compilation)
1986	The Greatest Story Ever Told
1988	Live Free or Die
1989	Days of Madness
1991	No More Innocence (Mini-album)
1993	Prime Time
2019	That's Not the Real World (Live)

=== Compilation albums ===
Release date	Title
1987	Young Virgins (featuring "Light of the World")
2002	Sun Family

=== EPs ===
Release date	Title
1984	World of Light
1985	Love Me
1986	She Knows
2024	Forces of Evil
2026	Love Death Wealth Water

=== Singles ===
Release date	Title
1985	"Day and Night"
1986	"She Knows" - UK No. 70
1986	"Slow Down"
1986	"Light of the World"
1986	"New Kind of Love" (Australia only)
1987	"I'll Show You Something Special"
1987	"I Love the Things You Do to Me"
1988	"Live Free or Die (Texas Redbeard Mix)"
1989	"I Took a Little"
1990	"A Little Bit of Love"
1993	"Shame on You"

== See also ==
- Reading and Leeds Festivals line-ups
