= James Harder =

American academic (1926–2006)

James A. Harder
- Born: December 2, 1926; Fullerton, California
- Died: December 30, 2006 (aged 80); Talequah, Oklahoma
- Occupations: Professor of Engineering; Ufologist

James Albert Harder, Ph.D., (December 2, 1926 – December 30, 2006) was a professor of civil and hydraulic engineering at the University of California, Berkeley. He was a professor emeritus there. Harder also had interest in ufology.

== Engineering ==
Harder taught in civil engineering at several levels, including practical aspects like lab experiments relating to the field and model testing. He produced few papers but was known for their quality.

Harder is notable for his contributions that advanced the field of flow simulations, including before the use of computers became ubiquitous. A paper he co-authored, Sea Water Intrusion in California, received an American Water Works Association award in 1957. His work was applied at Suisun Bay and the Mekong Delta. He also studied fish protection facilities.

He eventually studied fluid mechanics in the context of medicine. He worked on the development of electric artificial hearts and gastrointestinal endoscopes as well as equipment to prevent the need for external bags associated with colostomy.

== Ufology ==
Harder believed unidentified flying objects to be extraterrestrial beings and testified to the House of Representatives Committee on Science and Astronautics. He was part of the Aerial Phenomena Research Organization (APRO).

== Education ==
- B.S., 1948, California Institute of Technology
- M.S., Civil Engineering, 1952, UC Berkeley
- Ph.D., Fluid Mechanics, 1957, UC Berkeley

== Career ==
- U.S. Navy, 1944-45 (electronics technician)
- Design Engineer, soil conservation service, U.S. Department of Agriculture, 1948–50
- UC Berkeley, Resident engineer, 1952–57
- UC Berkeley, assistant professor, hydraulic engineering, 1957–62
- UC Berkeley, associate professor of civil engineering, 1962–70
- UC Berkeley, professor of civil engineering, 1970–91
- UC Berkeley, professor emeritus (1991)

== Organizations ==
- Fellow of the American Association for the Advancement of Science (AAAS)
- Fellow of the American Society of Civil Engineers (ASCE)
- Founding member, Society for Scientific Exploration website
