= Aerial Phenomena Research Organization =

Defunct UFO research group

The Aerial Phenomena Research Organization (APRO) was a UFO research group started in January 1952 by Jim and Coral Lorenzen, of Sturgeon Bay, Wisconsin.

The group was based in Tucson, Arizona after 1960. APRO had many state branches, remaining active until late 1988.

APRO stressed scientific field investigations and had a large staff of consulting Ph.D. scientists. A notable example was James E. McDonald of the University of Arizona, a well-known atmospheric physicist and perhaps the leading scientific UFO researcher of his time. Another was James Harder of the University of California, Berkeley, a civil and hydraulic engineering professor, who acted as director of research from 1969 to 1982. McDonald and Harder were among six scientists who testified about UFOs before the U.S. House of Representatives Committee on Science and Astronautics on July 29, 1968, when they sponsored a one-day symposium on the subject.

Astronomer J. Allen Hynek cited APRO and National Investigations Committee On Aerial Phenomena (NICAP) as the two best civilian UFO groups of their time, consisting largely of sober, serious-minded people capable of valuable contributions to the subject.

In 1969, a sizable portion of APRO's membership elected to form a new group named the "Midwest UFO Network"; this soon expanded and became the Mutual UFO Network (MUFON), still active today.

After almost 35 years of being in storage, the APRO case file collection was finally transitioned to the National UFO Historical Records Center (www.nufohrc.org) in Albuquerque, New Mexico on November 25, 2023.
