= The Greatest Story Ever Told (Balaam and the Angel album) =

Studio album by Balaam and the Angel
- Released: 1986
- Genre: Rock, pop
- Label: Virgin
- Producer: Hugh Jones, John A. Rivers

Balaam and the Angel chronology
Sun Family (1985)	The Greatest Story Ever Told (1986)	Young Virgins (1987)

The Greatest Story Ever Told is the debut album by the British band Balaam and the Angel, released in 1986. They supported it by playing the Reading Festival and by opening for the Mission on a North American tour. The album peaked at No. 67 in the UK Albums Chart. It was reissued in 2008, with B-sides and bonus tracks.

== Production ==
The album was produced primarily by Hugh Jones. Balaam and the Angel spent five weeks in the recording studio before starting over with the producer. The band, initially considered a gothic rock act, strove for a poppier, less dark sound. They explicitly rejected the goth label, and thought that their sound came from a combination of the three brothers' musical interests. Guitarist Jim Morris used an echo on his instrument on several tracks. The album title was taken from a Melody Maker article about the band.

== Critical reception ==
Professional ratings
Review scores
Source	Rating
The Encyclopedia of Popular Music	3/5 stars
The Great Metal Discography	6/10
The Hartford Advocate	4/5 stars
Omaha World-Herald	4.5/5 stars
Telegraph & Argus	4/5 stars

The Gazette said that Jones "has added a lot of orchestration to the overall sound, giving the material a pop veneer... All-in-all, the album's lightweight and pleasant listening." The Washington Post noted that "the energetic trio shares a Cultish predilection for simple, decidedly secular subject matter, compact, concise songs and ringing, stinging guitars." The Los Angeles Times concluded, "The album's array of folky rock mysticism, popish horn charts, wild guitar gyrations, rustic moods and sonic collages recall a variety of sources, from the Kinks to the Stones' Between the Buttons period to the Velvet Underground to today types like Gene Loves Jezebel and Julian Cope. Slightly derivative, perhaps, but with an engaging enthusiasm."

The Coleshill Chronicle called The Greatest Story Ever Told "a very good pop record" that owes much "to the stadium rock spirit". The Bristol Evening Post labelled it "a likeable album exploring the more melodic side of rock". The Birmingham Evening Mail considered it "one of the best debuts of a decade." Trouser Press concluded that the album "does have some charm, but the trio's melodies are too often buried in feeble attempts to whip up a vague air of menace."

== Track listing ==
No.	Title	Length
1.	"New Kind of Love"
2.	"Don't Look Down"
3.	"She Knows"
4.	"Burn Me Down"
5.	"Light of the World"
6.	"Slow Down"
7.	"The Wave"
8.	"Warm Again"
9.	"Never End"
10.	"Nothing There at All"
11.	"Walk Away"
12.	"Day and Night"
