= Condon Committee =

University of Colorado UFO Project

Mass-market paperback edition of the Condon Report, published by New York Times/Bantam Books (January, 1969), 965 pages.

The Condon Committee was the informal name of the University of Colorado UFO Project, a group funded by the United States Air Force from 1966 to 1968 at the University of Colorado to study unidentified flying objects under the direction of physicist Edward Condon. The result of its work, formally titled Scientific Study of Unidentified Flying Objects, and known as the Condon Report, appeared in 1968.

After examining hundreds of UFO files from the Air Force's Project Blue Book and from the civilian UFO groups National Investigations Committee On Aerial Phenomena (NICAP) and Aerial Phenomena Research Organization (APRO), and investigating sightings reported during the life of the project, the Committee produced a Final Report that said the study of UFOs was unlikely to yield major scientific discoveries.

The report's conclusions received a mixed reception from scientists and academic journals. The report has been cited as a decisive factor in the generally low level of interest in UFO activity among academics since that time. According to a principal critic of the Report, it is "the most influential public document concerning the scientific status of this UFO problem. Hence, all current scientific work on the UFO problem must refer to the Condon Report".

== Background ==
Beginning in 1947 with Project Sign, which then became Project Grudge and finally Project Blue Book, the U.S. Air Force conducted formal studies of UFOs, a subject of considerable public and some governmental interest. Blue Book had come under increasing criticism in the 1960s. Growing numbers of critics—including U.S. politicians, newspaper writers, UFO researchers, scientists and some of the general public—were suggesting that Blue Book was conducting shoddy, unsupported research or perpetrating a cover up. The Air Force did not want to continue its studies but did not want a cessation of studies to provoke additional cover-up charges. UFOs had become so controversial that no other government agency was willing to take on further UFO studies.

Following a wave of UFO reports in 1965, astronomer and Blue Book consultant J. Allen Hynek wrote a letter to the Air Force Scientific Advisory Board (AFSAB) suggesting that a panel convene to re-examine Blue Book. The AFSAB agreed and the committee it formed, chaired by Brian O'Brien, convened for one day in February, 1966, and suggested UFO studies could be undertaken "in more detail and depth than had been possible to date" and that the U.S. Air Force should work "with a few selected universities to provide scientific teams" to study UFOs. The committee suggested that about 100 well-documented UFO sightings should be studied annually, with about 10 man-days devoted to each case.

At a Congressional UFO hearing on April 5, 1966, Air Force Secretary Harold Brown defended the Air Force's UFO studies and repeated the O'Brien Committee's call for more studies. Hynek repeated his call for "a civilian panel of physical and social scientists" to "examine the UFO problem critically for the express purpose of determining whether a major problem exists." Shortly after the hearing, the Air Force announced it was seeking one or more universities to undertake a study of UFOs. The Air Force wanted to have several groups, but it took some time to find even a single school willing to accept the Air Force's offer. Both Hynek and James E. McDonald suggested their own campuses, Northwestern University and the University of Arizona, and others suggested astronomer Donald Menzel. All were judged too closely allied with one position or another. Hynek had a long association with the Air Force, McDonald was pro-UFO and Menzel anti-UFO. Several universities declined to participate, including Harvard University, the University of California, Berkeley, the Massachusetts Institute of Technology and the University of North Carolina at Chapel Hill. Walter Orr Roberts, director of the National Center for Atmospheric Research, and Menzel suggested physicist Edward Condon of the University of Colorado.

In the summer of 1966, Condon agreed to consider the Air Force's offer. He was among the best known and most distinguished scientists of his time. Condon's tenacious encounters with the House Unamerican Activities Committee and other government Loyalty Boards in the 1940s and 1950s made him "almost legendary" among fellow scientists. On Condon's behalf, Robert J. Low, an assistant dean of the university's graduate program, explored faculty reaction to the proposed project and found it mixed and wary. He also tried to reassure those who found the enterprise unworthy of scientific investigation. Low told the Denver Post that the project had met the university's acceptance threshold by the narrowest of margins and was accepted largely because it was difficult to say no to the Air Force. Some have suggested that finances were factor in Colorado's decision to accept the Air Force's offer of $313,000 for the project. Condon dismissed this suggestion, noting that $313,000 was a rather modest budget for an undertaking scheduled to last more than a year with a staff of over a dozen. Total funding later rose above $500,000.

On October 6, 1966, the University of Colorado agreed to undertake the UFO study, with Condon as director, Low as coordinator, and Stuart W. Cook, Franklin E. Roach, David R. Saunders and William A. Scott as principal or co-principal investigators. The Air Force announced its selection of Condon and the University of Colorado in October 1966. Other committee members included astronomer William K. Hartmann; psychologists Michael Wertheimer, Dan Culbertson and graduate student James Wadsworth; chemist Roy Craig; electrical engineer Norman Levine and physicist Frederick Ayer. Many other scientists or experts served in part-time and temporary roles or as consultants. Public response to the Committee's announcement was generally positive. Hynek characterized Condon's perspective towards UFOs as "basically negative", but he also assumed that Condon's opinions would change once he familiarized himself with evidence in some of the more puzzling UFO cases. NICAP's Donald Keyhoe was publicly supportive, but privately expressed fears that the Air Force would be controlling things from behind the scenes. That a scientist of Condon's standing would involve himself with UFO research heartened some academics who had long expressed interest in the subject, such as atmospheric physicist James E. McDonald.

When the project was announced, The Nation, commented: "If Dr. Condon and his associates come up with anything less than the little green men from Mars, they will be crucified."

== Committee work ==
In November 1966, retired USMC Major Donald Keyhoe and Richard H. Hall, both of NICAP, briefed the panel. They agreed to share NICAP's research files and to improve the collection of UFO reports. The committee also secured help from APRO, another civilian UFO research group. The committee moved slowly, hampered by disagreements about the use of funds and methodology. By hiring people with no prior position on UFOs, the committee staff lacked expertise and subject matter expertise. One committee member suggested filming UFOs using stereo cameras mounted with diffraction gratings in order to study the spectrum of light emitted by UFOs. This had been attempted some fifteen years earlier following a specific suggestion regarding UFOs made by Joseph Kaplan in 1954, but was quickly judged impractical after a number of such cameras were distributed to Air Force bases. As they began their analyses, committee members usually worked without coordination with one another. Individuals embraced diverse approaches, especially with respect to the extraterrestrial hypothesis (ETH).

In late January 1967, Condon stated in a lecture that he thought the government should not study UFOs because the subject was 'nonsense', adding, "but I'm not supposed to reach that conclusion for another year." One NICAP member resigned from NICAP in protest and Saunders confronted Condon to express his concern that NICAP's withdrawal would eliminate a valuable source of case files and produce damaging publicity.

=== Low memo controversy ===
In July 1967, James E. McDonald, a confirmed believer in the validity of UFO sightings, learned from a committee member about a memo Low had written on August 9, 1966, in which he reassured two University of Colorado administrators that they could expect the study to demonstrate that UFO observations had no basis in reality. "Our study would be conducted almost entirely by non-believers who, though they couldn't possibly prove a negative result, could and probably would add an impressive body of thick evidence that there is no reality to the observations. The trick would be, I think, to describe the project so that, to the public, it would appear a totally objective study but, to the scientific community, would present the image of a group of non-believers trying their best to be objective but having an almost zero expectation of finding a saucer." McDonald, after locating a copy of the memo in the project's open files, wrote to Condon, quoting a few lines from it.

In response to the memo, on April 30, 1968, NICAP severed its ties with the committee and Keyhoe circulated copies of Low's memo. Press coverage included an article, "Flying Saucer Fiasco" by John G. Fuller in the May 1968 issue of Look, that presented interviews with Saunders and Levine, and detailed the controversy and described the project as a "$500,000 trick." Fuller was a journalist identified with those who found UFO sightings credible, the author of a 1966 work on a sighting. Condon responded that the article contained "falsehoods and misrepresentations." Scientific and technical journals reported the controversy. Industrial Research reprinted Low's memo, while Scientific Research interviewed Saunders and Levine, who reported that they were considering a libel suit against Condon for terminating them for alleged "incompetence." They said that Condon had used an "unscientific approach" in directing the committee. Condon said that calling his methods "unscientific" was itself libelous, and in turn threatened to sue Saunders and Levine. When the American Association for the Advancement of Science covered the committee controversy in an issue of its official journal Science, Condon first promised to grant an interview, but then declined. He resigned from the AAAS in protest when the article was published without his input. Congressional Representative J. Edward Roush said the Look article raised "grave doubts as to the scientific profundity and objectivity of the project." He asked the General Accounting Office to investigate the study, which the GAO declined to do. He held a hearing dominated by critics of the project. Roush later joined the board of NICAP. Low resigned from the project in May 1968.

Some later critics of the committee's work saw little reason to make much of the trick memo. Committee member David Saunders wrote that "to present Low as a plotter or conspirator is unfair and hardly accurate." Hynek wrote that Low "wanted his university to get the contract...and to convince the university administration that they should take it." Project investigator Roy Craig later wrote that the memo did not trouble him because Condon had not known of the Low memo for eighteen months and it did not reflect his views. Condon wrote in the project's Final Report that the memo's description of the project as emphasizing the "psychology and sociology" of those who report UFO sightings showed how completely Low misunderstood the project when he wrote the memo.

=== Final months ===
Despite the withdrawal of NICAP from the project, members of its Early Warning Network continued to report sightings to the investigators, as did journalists.

Scientists who anticipated the committee would recommend against continued government UFO research rushed their own refutation into print in advance of the committee's Final Report. Called UFO's? Yes! and written by Saunders, it questioned whether the CIA wanted to divert public attention from UFOs. It used three cases to make the case for extraterrestrial activity. Project investigator Roy Craig later described each of the cases as "utter nonsense," "highly suspect," and unexplained but very weak.

== Committee Report ==
The committee delivered its report to the Air Force in November 1968, which released it in January 1969. The Report, 1,485 pages in hardcover and 965 pages in paperback, divided UFO cases into five categories: old UFO reports from before the committee convened, new reports, photographic cases, radar/visual cases, and UFOs reported by astronauts. Some UFO cases fell into multiple categories. Condon authored 6 pages of "conclusions and recommendations," a 43-page "summary," and a 50-page history of UFO phenomena and research over the preceding twenty years.

In his introductory "Conclusions and Recommendations", Condon wrote: "Our general conclusion is that nothing has come from the study of UFOs in the past 21 years that has added to scientific knowledge. Careful consideration of the record as it is available to us leads us to conclude that further extensive study of UFOs probably cannot be justified in the expectation that science will be advanced thereby." He also recommended against the creation of a government program to investigate UFO reports. He also described the problem that confronts the scientific community, that each scientist must evaluate the record for himself, and that the Report's recommendation against further research "may not be true for all time." He advised that government agencies and private foundations "ought to be willing to consider UFO research proposals...on an open-minded, unprejudiced basis....[E]ach individual case ought to be carefully considered on its own merits." In particular, the Report noted that there were gaps in scientific knowledge in the fields of "atmospheric optics, including radio wave propagation, and of atmospheric electricity" that might benefit from further research in the UFO field.

The Report detailed 59 case studies, though for legal reasons their locations were changed. New York Times science editor Walter Sullivan, in his introduction to the published version of the Report, said the series "reads like a modern, real-life collection of Sherlock Holmes episodes. The cases range from the eerily perplexing to the preposterously naive. The reader is given a taste of scientific method, even though the cases are often such that they defy anything approaching deductive analysis." Six chapters covered field studies of such physical evidence as electromagnetic effects, and visual and radar images. One treated the observations of U.S. astronauts.

Notably in Case 2 in Section IV, Chapter 2 the report said of the 1956 Lakenheath-Bentwaters incident: "In conclusion, although conventional or natural explanations certainly cannot be ruled out, the probability of such seems low in this case and the probability that at least one genuine UFO was involved appears to be fairly high."

Even before its completion, the Air Force had asked the National Academy of Sciences to "provide an independent assessment of the scope, the methodology, and the findings" of the committee. A panel chaired by Yale astronomer Gerald M. Clemence studied the Report for six weeks and concluded that "on the basis of present knowledge the least likely explanation of UFOs is the hypothesis of extraterrestrial visitations by intelligent beings" and that "no high priority in UFO investigations is warranted by data of the past two decades."

In response to the Report's findings, the Air Force closed Project Blue Book, established in March 1952, on December 17, 1969.

== Assessments ==
The Report earned a mixed reception from scientists and academic journals, while receiving "almost universal praise from the news media". Many newspapers, magazines and journals which published approving reviews or editorials related to the Condon Report. Some compared any continued belief in UFOs with the belief that the earth is flat. Others predicted that interest in UFOs would wane and in a few generations be only dimly remembered. Science, the official publication of the American Association for the Advancement of Science, said "The Colorado Study is unquestionably the most thorough and sophisticated investigation of the nebulous UFO phenomenon ever conducted."

The March 8, 1969 issue of Nature offered a generally positive review for the Condon Report, but wondered why so much effort had been expended on such a subject: "The Colorado project is a monumental achievement, but one of perhaps misapplied ingenuity. It would doubtless be inapt to compare it with earlier centuries' attempts to calculate how many angels could balance on the point of a pin; it is more like taking a sledgehammer to crack a nut, except that the nuts will be quite immune to its impact." On January 8, 1969, the New York Times headlined its coverage: "U.F.O. Finding: No Visits From Afar." The article said the project's final report on U.F.O.s "has uncovered no evidence that they are intelligently guided spacecraft from beyond the earth."

Critics made their case repeatedly without obtaining the government support they sought. One described the Report as "a rather unorganized compilation of independent articles on disparate subjects, a minority of which dealt with UFOs." Hynek described the Report as "a voluminous, rambling, poorly organized" and wrote that "less than half...was addressed to the investigation of UFO reports." In the April 14, 1969 issue of Scientific Research, Robert L. M. Baker, Jr. wrote that the Condon Committee's Report "seems to justify scientific investigation along many general and specialized frontiers." In the December 1969 issue of Physics Today, committee consultant Gerald Rothberg wrote that he had thoroughly investigated about 100 UFO cases, three or four of which left him puzzled. He thought that this "residue of unexplained reports [indicated a] legitimate scientific controversy." Critics charged that Condon's case summaries were inaccurate or misleading with enigmatic reports "buried" among the confirmed cases.

In December 1969, physicist James E. McDonald called the Report "inadequate" and said "it represents an examination of only a tiny fraction of the most puzzling UFO reports of the past two decades, and that its level of scientific argumentation is wholly unsatisfactory." In a 1969 issue of the American Journal of Physics, astronomer Thornton Page (who thought the phenomenon had a sociological basis) wrote of the report: "Intelligent laymen can (and do) point out the logical flaw in Condon's conclusion based on a statistically small (and selected) sample. Even in this sample a consistent pattern can be recognized; it is ignored by the 'authorities,' who then compound their 'felony' by recommending that no further observational data be collected." Page had been a member of the Robertson Panel which suggested UFOs should be debunked to reduce public interest.

In November 1970, the American Institute of Aeronautics and Astronautics generally agreed with Condon's suggestion that little of value had been uncovered by scientific UFO studies, but "did not find a basis in the report for [Condon's] prediction that nothing of scientific value will come of further studies."

=== Principal critics ===
Astronomer J. Allen Hynek wrote that "The Condon Report settled nothing." He called Condon's introduction "singularly slanted" and wrote that it "avoided mentioning that there was embedded within the bowels of the report a remaining mystery; that the committee had been unable to furnish adequate explanations for more than a quarter of the cases examined." Hynek contended that "Condon did not understand the nature and scope of the problem" he was studying and objected to the idea that only extraterrestrial life could explain UFO activity. By focusing on this hypothesis, he wrote, the Report "did not try to establish whether UFOs really constituted a problem for the scientist, whether physical or social."

Astrophysicist Peter A. Sturrock wrote that "critical reviews...came from scientists who had actually carried out research in the UFO area, while the laudatory reviews came from scientists who had not carried out such research." As an example, Sturrock noted a case in which an allegedly supersonic UFO did not produce a sonic boom. He notes that "we should not assume that a more advanced civilization could not find some way at traveling with supersonic speeds without producing a sonic boom."

== See also ==
- Project Magnet (Canada), 1950–54

== Sources ==
- Final Report of the Scientific Study of Unidentified Flying Objects, Edward U. Condon, Scientific Director, Daniel S. Gillmor, Editor, available online, accessed May 25, 2011; paperback edition, Bantam Books, 1968
- C. D. B. Bryan, Close Encounters of the Fourth Kind: Alien Abduction, UFOs and the Conference at M.I.T., Alfred A. Knopf, 1995
- Jerome Clark, The UFO Book: Encyclopedia of the Extraterrestrial, Visible Ink, 1998
- Roy Craig, UFOs: An Insider's View of the Official Quest for Evidence (University of North Texas Press, 1995)
- Steven J. Dick, The Biological Universe: The Twentieth Century Extraterrestrial Life Debate and the Limits of Science (NY: Cambridge University Press, 1996)
- Richard M. Dolan, UFOs and the National Security State: Chronology of a Cover-up 1941–1973, 2002
- J. Allen Hynek, The UFO Experience: A Scientific Inquiry, Ballantine Books, 1972, available online, accessed September 30, 2025
- David Michael Jacobs, The UFO Controversy in America, Indiana University Press, 1975
- David R. Saunders and R. Roger Harkins, UFO's? Yes! Where the Condon Committee Went Wrong, World Publishing, 1968
- Peter A. Sturrock, The UFO Enigma: A New Review of the Physical Evidence, Warner Books, 1999

== External links and Sources ==
- Condon Report online (pdf)
