= James E. McDonald =

American meteorologist and ufologist (1920-1971)

James Edward McDonald
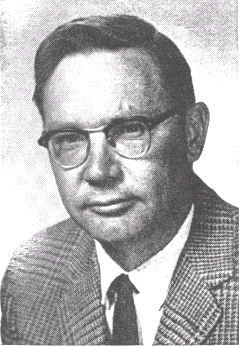
- Born: May 7, 1920; Duluth, Minnesota, US
- Died: June 13, 1971 (aged 51); Tucson, Arizona, US

Academic background
- Education: University of Omaha; MIT; Iowa State University
- Thesis: Radiation-Errors and Lag-Errors in the Measurement of Turbulent Temperature Fluctuations (1951)
- Doctoral advisor: Joseph M. Keller
- Other advisor: Thomas F. Malone

Academic work
- Discipline: cloud physics weather modification ufology
- Institutions: Naval Aerology School; Iowa State University; University of Chicago; University of Arizona

James Edward McDonald (May 7, 1920 – June 13, 1971) was an American atmospheric physicist and meteorologist. He is known for his scientific research in weather modification through cloud seeding, while working as an associate director at the Institute for Atmospheric Physics and as a professor of meteorology at the University of Arizona in Tucson.

During the 1960s, McDonald campaigned in support of expanding UFO studies, and promoted the extraterrestrial hypothesis as a plausible explanation of UFO phenomena.

== Early life and career ==
McDonald was born and raised in Duluth, Minnesota. He served as a cryptographer in the United States Navy during World War II, and afterwards, married Betsy Hunt. McDonald received a B.A. in chemistry from the University of Omaha in 1942 and an M.S. in meteorology from the Massachusetts Institute of Technology in 1945, where he completed the thesis titled Summer air mass instability and its synoptic representation under the supervision of Thomas F. Malone. He went on to study physics at Iowa State University, where he received his Ph.D. in 1951. His Ph.D. thesis was supervised by Joseph M. Keller and is titled Radiation-Errors and Lag-Errors in the Measurement of Turbulent Temperature Fluctuations.

After graduation, McDonald taught at the Naval Aerology School and at Iowa State University before moving to the University of Chicago for a year. In 1953, McDonald helped establish a meteorology and atmospherics program at the University of Arizona as a professor of meteorology. McDonald joined the Institute of Atmospheric Physics at the University of Arizona in 1954 as an associate director and worked under the founding director Roscoe Braham Jr. McDonald remained at the same institution until his death.

The University of Arizona library keeps a collection of McDonald's publications.

== Meteorology research ==
McDonald was known for his many studies on the formation and aerodynamics of raindrops and on the modeling of the scavenging effects of rain. He examined physical factors influencing raindrop shape, identifying surface tension, hydrostatic pressure, and aerodynamic pressure as the primary contributors to deformation and revealed with high-speed photography the significant role of boundary layer separation in shaping drops and influencing surface processes. He provided one of the first physical models of the rain-scavenging effect and analyzed the efficiency of raindrops in capturing airborne particles. The research found that larger particles like pollen are effectively removed by most rains, while smaller spores experience lower removal rates, emphasizing the role of rain-scavenging in pollen dissemination.

In 1956, McDonald organized the Conference on the Scientific Basis of Weather Modification Studies at the University of Arizona, an influential event of the day to assess the state of weather modification research using cloud seeding and its future direction. He continued participation in the scientific discourse in weather modification and was a member of the Panel on Weather and Climate Modification headed by Gordon J. F. MacDonald, which was formed in 1963 by the appointment of the Committee on Atmospheric Science of the National Academy of Sciences.

== UFO studies ==
McDonald's first detailed, public discussion of UFOs was in a lecture given before an American Meteorological Society assembly in Washington, D.C., on October 5, 1966. Entitled "The Problem of UFOs", McDonald said that scientific scrutiny should be directed towards the small number of "unknowns", which he defined as a UFO reported by a "credible and trained observer as machine-like 'craft' which remained unidentified in spite of careful investigation." He noted that the vast majority of UFOs could become identified flying objects, and, in his estimation, only about 1% of UFOs were true "unknowns".

In 1967, the Office of Naval Research supported McDonald to conduct his own UFO research, ostensibly to study the idea that some UFOs were misidentified clouds. He was able to examine the files of Project Blue Book at Wright Patterson Air Force Base, and eventually concluded that the Air Force was mishandling UFO evidence. McDonald secured support from United Nations Secretary General U Thant, who arranged for McDonald to speak to the UN's Outer Space Affairs Group on June 7, 1967. Additionally in 1967, McDonald noted, "There is no sensible alternative to the utterly shocking hypothesis that UFOs are extraterrestrial probes".

In his Statement on Unidentified Flying Objects to the House Committee on Science and Astronautics, McDonald made the following remarks regarding types of UFO accounts:

"the scientific world at large is in for a shock when it becomes aware of the astonishing nature of the UFO phenomenon and its bewildering complexity. I make that terse comment well aware that it invites easy ridicule; but intellectual honesty demands that I make clear that my two years' study convinces me that in the UFO problem lie scientific and technological questions that will challenge the ability of the world's outstanding scientists to explain - as soon as they start examining the facts. [...] the scientific community [...] has been casually ignoring as nonsense a matter of extraordinary scientific importance."

=== The Condon Committee ===
Following a widely publicized series of mass UFO sightings in southern Michigan, the federal government created the Condon Committee in late 1966, named after committee chairman Edward Condon, a former director of the National Bureau of Standards. McDonald offered to serve on the committee, but when he was denied a position, McDonald still agreed to assist with the committee's work.

When the Condon Committee issued its final report in 1969, Condon wrote in the foreword to the report that, based on the committee's investigations, his conclusion was that there was nothing unusual about UFO reports; thus further scientific research into the UFO phenomenon was not worthwhile and should be discouraged. Condon's conclusions about UFOs were generally accepted by most scientists and the mainstream news media. McDonald, however, wrote detailed critiques and rebuttals of Condon's conclusions regarding UFOs. McDonald was particularly disturbed by the fact that, while Condon in his foreword claimed that all UFO reports could be explained as hoaxes or misidentifications of man-made or natural objects or phenomena, the Report itself marked over 30% of the cases it investigated as "unexplained".

=== 1968: Congressional UFO testimony ===
McDonald spoke before the United States Congress for a UFO hearing in 1968. In part, he stated his opinion that "UFOs are entirely real and we do not know what they are, because we have laughed them out of court. The possibility that these are extraterrestrial devices, that we are dealing with surveillance from some advanced technology, is a possibility I take very seriously".

=== 1969: "Science in Default" ===
In 1969, McDonald was a speaker at an American Association for the Advancement of Science UFO symposium. There he delivered a lecture, "Science in Default", in which he discussed a handful of UFO cases which seemed, he thought, to defy interpretation by conventional science. Ufologist Jerome Clark called the lecture "one of the most powerful scientific defenses of UFO reality ever mounted".

== Honors ==
McDonald was a member of the American Meteorological Society since 1944, a member of the National Academy of Sciences, and American Geophysical Union.

== Later life and death ==
In 1970, McDonald appeared before a committee of the United States Congress to provide evidence against the development of the supersonic transport (SST) plane, where he testified that the plane could potentially harm the Earth's ozone layer. During that testimony, Congressman Silvio O. Conte of Massachusetts—whose district contained factories that would help build the SST—tried to discredit McDonald by referring to his UFO research. Although McDonald defended his UFO work and noted that his evidence regarding the SST had nothing to do with UFOs, Conte stated that anyone who "believes in little green men" was, in his opinion, not a credible witness.

In May 1971, McDonald was blinded in a suicide attempt.

On June 13, 1971, McDonald was found dead with a head wound in a desert area of Tucson, Arizona, with a .38 caliber revolver and apparent suicide note found nearby.
