= Peter A. Sturrock =

British-American physicist (1924–2024)

Peter Andrew Sturrock
- Born: 20 March 1924; South Stifford, England, UK
- Died: 12 August 2024 (aged 100); Palo Alto, California, US
- Education: University of Cambridge
- Awards: Arctowski Medal (1990)
- Scientific career
- Fields: Astrophysics, plasma physics, solar physics
- Workplaces: Stanford University
- Doctoral advisor: Vernon Ellis Cosslett
- Doctoral students: Lisa Porter

Peter Andrew Sturrock (20 March 1924 – 12 August 2024) was a British-American physicist. A professor of applied physics at Stanford University, much of Sturrock's career was devoted to astrophysics, plasma physics, and solar physics, but Sturrock was interested in other fields, including ufology, scientific inference, the history of science, and the philosophy of science. Sturrock was awarded many prizes and honors, and wrote or co-authored many scientific papers and textbooks.

== Early life and education ==
Sturrock was born in the South Stifford area of Essex in England. He began his education studying mathematics at Cambridge University in 1942. During and after World War 2, Sturrock postponed his Cambridge studies in order to help develop radar systems at the Telecommunications Research Establishment, now the Royal Radar Establishment.

After the war, Sturrock resumed his education, and was awarded a scholarship at St John's College in 1947, followed by the University Rayleigh Prize for mathematics in 1949. Sturrock was elected to a fellowship at St John's in 1952. He then pursued work on electron physics at the Cavendish Laboratory, where his supervisor was Vernon Ellis Cosslett. This was followed by stints at Cambridge, the National Bureau of Standards, and the École Normale Supérieure at the University of Paris.

In 1951, Sturrock earned a Ph.D. in astrophysics.

== Career ==
In the 1950s, he began a varied and highly successful research career: nuclear physics at the Atomic Energy Research Establishment; plasma physics at St. Johns' College, Cambridge; microwave engineering at Stanford University, and accelerator physics at the European Organization for Nuclear Research (CERN). Also in the 1950s, Sturrock invented a number of implements, including a novel microwave tube later dubbed the "Free electron laser."

In 1961, Sturrock was appointed a professor of applied physics at Stanford University, where he remained until 1998; he was an emeritus professor of physics and applied physics at Stanford. In 1990 Sturrock was awarded the Arctowski Medal from the National Academy of Sciences. From 1992 to 1998, he was director of the Center for Space Science and Astrophysics, and from 1981 to 2001 was president of the Society for Scientific Exploration. Sturrock also served as chairman of the Plasma Physics Division and the Solar Physics Division of the American Astronomical Society.

In 2009, Sturrock published his autobiography, A Tale of Two Sciences: Memoirs of a Dissident Scientist, which covered both his research in conventional physics and his less mainstream investigations.

In 2013, Sturrock published AKA Shakespeare: A Scientific Approach to the Authorship Question. In this book, he laid out a method for weighing evidence which he developed for studying pulsars. Sturrock then invited the reader to apply the method to tabulate their own "degree of belief" in three different candidates for authorship of the works usually attributed to Shakespeare.

He was elected a Legacy Fellow of the American Astronomical Society in 2020.

== Death ==
Sturrock died at home in the United States, on 12 August 2024, at the age of 100.

== Interest in UFOs ==
Sturrock was a prominent contemporary scientist to express a keen interest in the subject of unidentified flying objects or UFOs.

Sturrock's interest traced back to the early 1970s when, seeking someone experienced with both computers and astrophysics, he hired Jacques Vallee for a research project. Upon learning that Vallee had written several books about UFOs, Sturrock—previously uninterested in UFOs—felt a professional obligation to at least peruse Vallee's books. Though still largely sceptical, Sturrock's interest was piqued by Vallee's books. Sturrock then turned to the Condon Report (1969), the result of a two-year UFO research project that had been touted as the answer to the UFO question. Sturrock commented that, "The upshot of this was that, far from supporting Condon's conclusions [that there was nothing extraordinary about UFOs], I thought the evidence presented in the report suggested that something was going on that needed study."

At about the same time that the Condon Committee was conducting its investigation, the American Institute of Aeronautics and Astronautics (AIAA) in 1967 had set up a subcommittee to bring the UFO phenomenon to the attention of serious scientists. In 1970 this subcommittee published a position paper also highly critical of how the Condon Committee had conducted its investigation and how Condon's written conclusions often didn't match the cases detailed in the final report. Overall, the AIAA deemed about a third of the cases still unsolved. Unlike Condon, they felt these unsolved cases represented the essential core of the UFO problem and deserving of further scientific scrutiny.

Sturrock was curious what the general attitudes of the members of the AIAA might be and in 1973 surveyed the San Francisco branch of the AIAA, with 423 out of 1175 members responding. Opinions were widespread as to whether UFOs were a scientifically significant problem. Most seemed unsure or neutral on the question. Sturrock was also curious as to whether fellow scientists like the AIAA members ever reported seeing UFOs, i.e., anomalous aerial phenomena that they couldn't identify. The survey indicated that about 5% had, which is typical for what is usually reported for the general population as a whole.

In 1975, Sturrock did a more comprehensive survey of members of the American Astronomical Society. Of some 2600 questionnaires, over 1300 were returned. Only two members offered to waive anonymity, and Sturrock noted that the UFO subject was obviously a very sensitive one for most of his colleagues. Nonetheless, Sturrock found a strong majority favored continued scientific studies, and over 80% offered to help if they could. Sturrock commented that the AAS members seemed more open to the question than the AIAA members in his previous survey. As in the AIAA survey, about 5% reported puzzling sightings, but skepticism against the Extraterrestrial Hypothesis (ETH) ran high. Most thought that UFO reports could ultimately be explained conventionally. Sturrock also found that skepticism and opposition to further study was correlated with lack of knowledge and study: only 29% of those who had spent less than an hour reading about the subject favored further study versus 68% who had spent over 300 hours.

In his analysis of the survey results, Sturrock noted that many scientists wished to see UFOs discussed in scientific journals (there was an almost complete absence of such articles in journals). He subsequently helped establish the Society for Scientific Exploration in 1982 to give a scientific forum to subjects that are neglected by the mainstream. The Journal has been criticized for catering to pseudoscience.

In 1998, Sturrock organized a scientific panel to review various types of physical evidence associated with UFOs. The panel felt that existing physical evidence that might support the ETH was inconclusive, but also deemed extremely puzzling UFO cases worthy of further scientific study. Sturrock subsequently wrote up the work of the panel in the 2000 book The UFO Enigma: A New Review of the Physical Evidence.
