= Japan Air Lines Cargo Flight 1628 =

Alleged UFO encounter in 1986

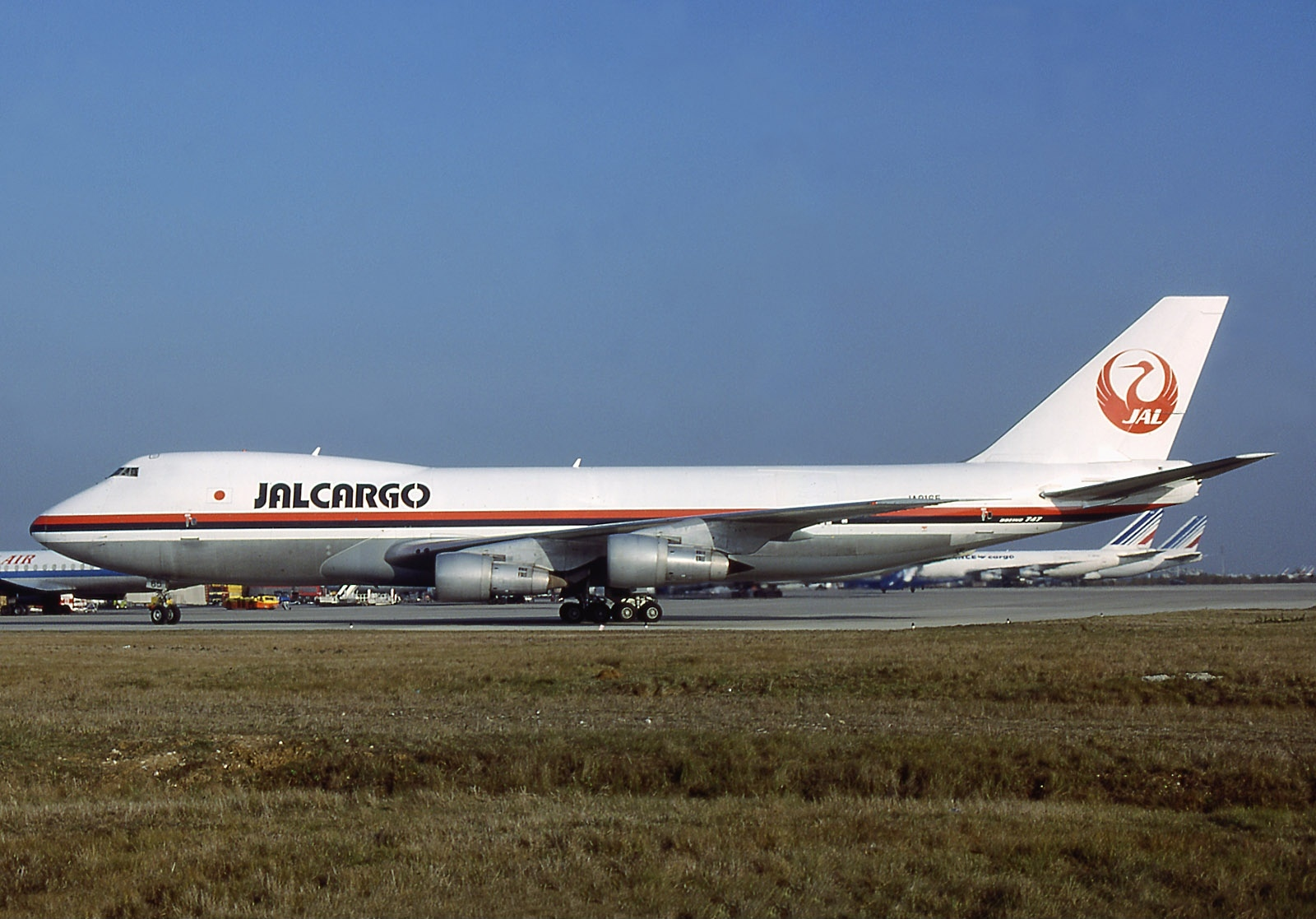
- A Boeing 747-200 similar to the aircraft involved

Incident
- Date: 17 November 1986
- Summary: Alleged UFO sighting
- Site: Alaska, United States

Aircraft
- Aircraft type: Boeing 747-246F
- Operator: JAL Cargo
- IATA flight No.: JL1628
- ICAO flight No.: JAL1628
- Call sign: JAPAN AIR 1628
- Flight origin: Paris Charles De Gaulle Airport, Paris, France
- Stopover: Keflavík International Airport, Suðurnesjabær, Iceland
- 1st stopover: Anchorage International Airport, Anchorage, Alaska, United States
- Destination: New Tokyo International Airport, Narita, Chiba, Japan
- Occupants: 3
- Crew: 3
- Fatalities: 0
- Survivors: 3

Japan Air Lines Cargo Flight 1628 was a Japanese Boeing 747-200 cargo aircraft flying from Paris Charles De Gaulle Airport to Narita International Airport that was involved in an unidentified flying object (UFO) sighting on 17 November 1986. During the flight, Captain Kenji Terauchi reported seeing three objects he described as "two small ships and the mothership". Both the FAA and Air Force confirmed that the unidentified flying objects appeared on their radars. Some astronomers and investigators believe that Terauchi probably mistook the planets Jupiter and Mars as UFOs.

== Observation ==
On the Reykjavík to Anchorage section of the flight at 17:11 over eastern Alaska, pilot Kenji Terauchi reported seeing three unidentified objects flying at 35,000 feet (11,000 m), which were "flying parallel and then ... very close". News media at the time reported that Terauchi referred to the objects as "the two small ships and the mother ship", and as "two small ones and one twice the size of an aircraft carrier". After six minutes, Terauchi radioed the Anchorage Federal Aviation Administration who advised him to take "evasive action" after seeing the objects on their radar. Terauchi decreased altitude and circled his cargo plane, but reported that the lights were still with his aircraft even after the manoeuvres.

At the time, news media stated that the FAA reported seeing objects near the plane even after the evasive manoeuvres, but upon later review, the military radar images were "dismissed as clutter, and an object that showed up on the aviation agency's screens was thought to be a coincidental split image of the aircraft". Fairbanks FAA air controllers saw only Flight 1628 on their radar screens.

Terauchi reported that the objects followed the plane for 640 kilometres (400 miles) and described what he perceived as rapid movements and sudden stops. Two planes that were near Flight 1628, a United Airlines airliner and a US Air Force C-130 cargo plane, reported that they did not see any objects either visually or on radar.

Flight 1628 landed in Anchorage, the crew were debriefed, and FAA investigators determined that they were "normal, professional, rational, (and had) no drug or alcohol involvement".

== Explanation ==
Editor of Aviation Week and Space Technology magazine and UFO investigator Phillip J. Klass reported that the planets Jupiter and Mars were in the area that Terauchi said he saw two lights, and although they would have been quite visible, he did not mention seeing them. Klass states that it is not unusual for an experienced pilot to "[mistake] a bright celestial body for a UFO, nor will it be the last. ... Jupiter was only 10 degrees above the horizon, making it appear to the pilot to be roughly at his own 35,000-foot altitude". Klass noted that the crew were interviewed separately in 1988 and asserts their remembrance of the event differed significantly.

According to Klass, the pilot later contradicted what he told flight controllers at the time of the incident. After reviewing transcripts of the radio communications, an FAA spokesperson stated that the pilot told ground controllers that he had lost "sight of the object after completing his turn". However, the spokesperson later asserted that Terauchi claimed the "object stayed with him as he turned".

The FAA released a data package of the incident characterizing Terauchi as a "'UFO repeater', having reported two other UFO sightings prior to November 17th, and two more this past January". In an 11 January 1987 UFO sighting reported by Terauchi in the same general area as Flight 1628, he stated seeing "irregular pulsating lights ... [and] a large black chunk just in front of us". The FAA radar did not confirm an object, and the event was later determined to have been "lights from small villages being diffused by thin clouds of ice crystals". Klass notes that Terauchi used the words "spaceship or mothership" in his reports and claimed that the "mothership ... did not want to be seen". Terauchi also claimed that "we humans will meet them in the near future".

According to skeptical researcher Robert Sheaffer, despite Flight 1628 becoming one of "the most celebrated cases in recent UFO literature, it turns out there wasn't much to read". About Terauchi's report, Sheaffer states that the pilot is not "an unbiased or objective observer". Science writer Brian Dunning writes that there was "nothing extraordinary or unusual on that evening", calling Terauchi "a fine and competent pilot, but was hardly unbiased when it came to alien spaceships". Dunning added that Flight 1628 was "just another unevidenced aerial anecdote".
