= National Investigations Committee On Aerial Phenomena =

U.S. based civilian UFO research group

National Investigations Committee On Aerial Phenomena (NICAP)
- Type: Non-Profit Organization
- Founded: October 24, 1956; 69 years ago
- Defunct: 1980
- Headquarters: Washington, D.C., U.S.
- Website: www.nicap.org

The National Investigations Committee On Aerial Phenomena (NICAP) is an unidentified flying object (UFO) research organization active in the United States from 1956 to 1980. Though NICAP no longer operates in its original form, it remains active primarily as an important informational depository on the UFO phenomenon.

== Overview ==
NICAP was a non-profit organization and faced financial collapse many times in its existence, due in no small part to business ineptitude among the group's directors. Following a wave of nationally publicized UFO incidents in the mid-1960s, NICAP's membership spiked dramatically and only then did the organization become financially stable. However, following publication of the Condon Report in 1968, NICAP's membership declined sharply, and the organization again fell into long-term financial decline and disarray.

Despite these internal troubles, NICAP probably had the most visibility of any civilian American UFO group, and arguably had the most mainstream respectability; Jerome Clark writes that "for many middle-class Americans and others interested in UFOs but repelled by ufology’s fringe aspects, it served as a sober forum for UFO reporting, inquiry, investigation, and speculation". NICAP advocated transparent scientific investigation of UFO sightings and was skeptical of "contactee" tales involving meetings with space visitors, the alien abduction phenomenon, and the like. The presence of several prominent military officials as members of NICAP brought a further measure of respectability for many observers.

Throughout its existence, NICAP argued that there was an organized governmental cover-up of UFO evidence. NICAP also pushed for governmental hearings regarding UFOs, with occasional success.

Though any UFO-related group attracts a number of uncritical enthusiasts along with a small percentage of cranks, astronomer J. Allen Hynek cited NICAP and Aerial Phenomena Research Organization (APRO) as the two best civilian UFO groups of their time, consisting largely of sober, serious-minded people capable of valuable contributions to the subject.

Until the mid-1960s, NICAP gave little attention to Close encounters of the third kind (CE3) (where animated beings are purportedly sighted in relation to a UFO). However, longtime NICAP member Richard H. Hall related privately that this position was "tactical and not doctrinaire." In other words, NICAP did not necessarily dismiss occupant reports out of hand, but elected to focus on other aspects of the UFO phenomenon which would be perceived by mainstream observers as less outlandish and more believable.

== History ==
=== 1950s ===
NICAP was founded on October 24, 1956, by inventor Thomas Townsend Brown. The board of governors included several prominent men, including Donald Keyhoe, Maj USMC (Ret.), and former chief of the Navy's guided missile program RADM Delmer S. Fahrney USN (Ret.)

By early January 1957, however, Brown had proved so financially inept that the board asked him to step down. Fahrney replaced him, then convened a press conference on January 16, 1957, where he announced that UFOs were under intelligent control, but that they were of neither American or Soviet origin. The press conference received major attention, doubtless aided by Fahrney's stature.

In April 1957, Fahrney resigned from NICAP, citing personal issues. It was later disclosed that his wife was seriously ill. Fahrney was bothered by the whispers and ridicule his UFO interests generated among many of his peers in the military.

Keyhoe became NICAP's director. He established a monthly newsletter, The U.F.O. Investigator. Another prominent figure joined NICAP's board of governors: Keyhoe's Naval Academy classmate VADM Roscoe H. Hillenkoetter, USN (Ret.) He had been Director of Central Intelligence and first head of the Central Intelligence Agency. Another important name on the letterhead was that of Gen. Albert Coady Wedemeyer USA (Ret.)

The organization had chapters and local associates scattered throughout the United States. Many of their members were amateurs, but a considerable percentage were professionals, including journalists, military personnel, scientists and physicians. One of NICAP's prime goals was thorough field investigations of UFO reports. They would eventually compile a significant number of case files and field investigations which Clark characterises as "often first rate".

By 1958, NICAP had grown to over 5000 members. Keyhoe's financial management and business skills were only slightly better than Brown's, and NICAP hobbled along throughout the 1950s and early 1960s, facing collapse on several occasions. For most of his tenure as director, Keyhoe sent irregular letters to NICAP's members, warning of the organization's imminent collapse, and soliciting funds to keep NICAP going. According to Jerome Clark (see sources below), Keyhoe often paid for much of NICAP's operating expenses himself.

=== 1960s ===
By the early 1960s, much of the American public was keenly interested in UFOs and NICAP's membership peaked at around 14,000. This influx of members greatly improved the group's finances. Hillenkoetter left the board in 1962.

In 1964, NICAP published The UFO Evidence, edited by Richard H. Hall, a summary of hundreds of unexplained reports studied by NICAP investigators up to 1963. Sightings were systematically broken down by witness category and special types of evidence. For example, individual chapters were devoted to sightings by military personnel, pilots and aviation experts, and scientists and engineers. Another chapter was devoted to evidence of intelligent control and yet another to physical evidence or interactions, such as electromagnetic effects, radar tracking, photographs, sound, physiological effects, and so on. Another section examined observed patterns, such as descriptions of shape, colors, maneuvers, flight behavior, and concentrations of sightings. This book is still considered an invaluable reference source in the field of UFO studies.

When the United States Air Force, in collaboration with the University of Colorado, established the Condon Committee (1966–68) to study UFOs, NICAP initially aided its investigations, but Keyhoe quickly became disenchanted and limited NICAP's role. NICAP formally severed ties with the Condon Committee in early 1968. Following the publication of the Condon Committee's report (which concluded there was nothing extraordinary about UFOs) in January, 1969, public interest in the subject abated, and NICAP's membership rapidly dropped to about 5000.

The last NICAP efforts of any significance were in 1969, two monographs: Strange Effects from UFOs and UFOs: A New Look.

NICAP's membership plummeted in the late 1960s, and Keyhoe faced accusations of financial incompetence and authoritarianism. By 1969, Keyhoe turned his focus away from the military and focused on the CIA as the source of the UFO cover up. By December 1969, NICAP's board, headed by Colonel Joseph Bryan III, forced Keyhoe to retire as Chief of NICAP. Under Bryan's leadership, NICAP disbanded its local and national affiliated groups. Afterwards, John L. Acuff became NICAP's director.

=== 1970s ===
NICAP's membership continued to drop as it was led by Acuff and then Alan Hall. By now, the organization was all but paralyzed by infighting, including unsubstantiated charges that the Central Intelligence Agency had infiltrated NICAP. In fact, several persons with CIA ties had joined NICAP; however, their motives and reasons for joining NICAP have been the subject of some debate.

One person specifically named as a suspected CIA infiltrator was retired Air Force Colonel Joseph Bryan III. His son, writer C. D. B. Bryan, dismisses this idea, suggesting that "Anyone who knows anything about the history of NICAP knows that the group didn’t need anybody's help in its disintegration; it simply self-destructed." As to his father's involvement as an alleged CIA agitator, Bryan writes, "my father’s unswerving, outspoken faith in UFOs ... was, I felt, something of an embarrassment ... I do not believe it was the sort of public position an agent would take whose covert goal was to smother interest in UFOs."

NICAP published its final newsletter in 1980; the organization was officially dissolved at the end of that year. NICAP's archive of UFO sighting case files was subsequently purchased by the Center for UFO Studies (CUFOS).

In November 2020, the case files of NICAP and CUFOS were transferred to Albuquerque, NM. They are currently curated there on behalf of CUFOS by The National UFO Historical Records Center.

== References in popular culture ==
- The frequently UFO-themed X-Files made occasional references to NICAP, most notably in the season 1 episode Fallen Angel in the shape of NICAP researcher Max Fenig. Fenig later returned in the season 4 two-part episode Tempus Fugit/Max.
- NICAP executive director Stuart Nixon appeared on an episode of the game show To Tell the Truth in its 1973-1974 season. Three of the four panelists correctly identified him at the end of the game.

== See also ==
- List of UFO organizations
