= Ufology =

Study of UFOs

Ufology, sometimes written UFOlogy (US: /juːˈfɑːlədʒi/ or UK: /juːˈfɒlədʒi/), is the investigation of unidentified flying objects (UFOs) by people who believe that they may be of extraordinary origins (most frequently of extraterrestrial alien visitors). While there are instances of government, private, and fringe science investigations of UFOs, ufology is generally regarded by skeptics and science educators as an example of pseudoscience.

== Etymology ==
Ufology is a neologism derived from UFO (a term coined by Edward J. Ruppelt), wherein the acronym UFO is combined with the suffix -logy (from the Ancient Greek -λογία (-logia)). One early use of the term includes an article in Fantastic Universe (1957). A 1958 presentation for the Planetary Center, a UFO "research organization", is another such example.

== Historical background ==
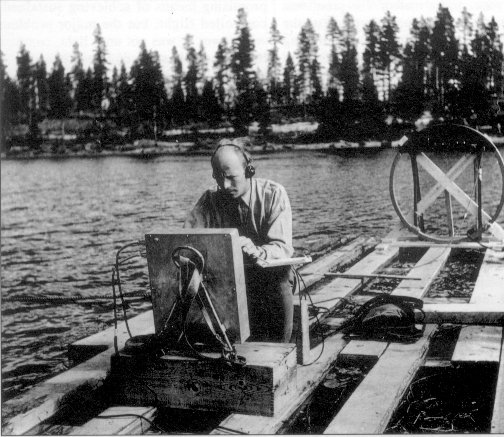
A Swedish Air Force officer searches for a "ghost rocket" in Lake Kölmjärv, Norrland, Sweden, in July 1946.

The roots of ufology include the "mystery airships" of the late 1890s, the "foo fighters" reported by Allied airmen during World War II, the "ghost fliers" of Europe and North America during the 1930s, the "ghost rockets" of Scandinavia (mainly Sweden) in 1946, and the Kenneth Arnold "flying saucer" sighting of 1947. Media attention to the Arnold sighting helped publicize the concept of flying saucers. Publicity of UFOs increased after World War II, coinciding with the escalation of the Cold War and strategic concerns related to the development and detection (for example, the Ground Observer Corps) of advanced Soviet aircraft.

Official, government-sponsored activities in the United States related to ufology ended in the late 1960s following the Condon Committee report and the termination of Project Blue Book. Government-sponsored, UFO-related activities in other countries, including the United Kingdom, Canada, Denmark, Italy, and Sweden also ended. An exception to this trend is France, which maintains the research program GEIPAN, formerly known as GEPAN (1977–1988) and SEPRA (1988–2004), operated by the French Space Agency CNES. On 14 September 2023, NASA reported the appointment, for the first time, of a Director of UAP Research (with the term UAP replacing the earlier acronym UFO), identified as Mark McInerney, to scientifically and transparently study such occurrences.

Ufology may be considered as a form of grassroots science, but one that is stigmatized by mainstream science.

== As a field ==
=== Status as a pseudoscience ===
Despite investigations sponsored by governments and private entities, ufology is not embraced by academia as a scientific field of study, and is instead generally considered a pseudoscience by skeptics and science educators, being often included on lists of topics characterized as pseudoscience as either a partial or total pseudoscience. Pseudoscience is a term that classifies arguments that are claimed to exemplify the methods and principles of science, but do not adhere to an appropriate scientific method, lack supporting evidence, plausibility, falsifiability, or otherwise lack scientific status.

Some writers have identified social factors that contribute to the status of ufology as a pseudoscience, with one study suggesting that "any science doubt surrounding unidentified flying objects and aliens was not primarily due to the ignorance of ufologists about science, but rather a product of the respective research practices of and relations between ufology, the sciences, and government investigative bodies". One study suggests that "the rudimentary standard of science communication attending to the extraterrestrial intelligence (ETI) hypothesis for UFOs inhibits public understanding of science, dissuades academic inquiry within the physical and social sciences, and undermines progressive space policy initiatives".

=== Current interest ===
In 2021, astronomer Avi Loeb launched The Galileo Project, which intends to collect and report scientific evidence of extraterrestrials or extraterrestrial technology on or near Earth via telescopic observations. In Germany, the University of Würzburg is developing intelligent sensors that can help detect and analyze aerial objects in hopes of applying such technology to UAP. A 2021 Gallup poll found that belief among Americans in some UFOs being extraterrestrial spacecraft grew between 2019 and 2021 from 33% to 41%. Gallup cited increased coverage in mainstream news and scrutiny from government authorities as a factor in changing attitudes towards UFOs.

In 2022, NASA announced a nine-month study starting in the fall to help establish a road map for investigating UAP—or for reconnaissance of the publicly available data it might use for such research. In 2023, the RAND Corporation published a study reviewing 101,151 public reports of UAP sightings in the United States from 1998 to 2022. The models used to conduct the analysis showed that reports of UAP sightings were less likely within 30 km of weather stations, 60 km of civilian airports, and in more–densely populated areas, while rural areas tended to have a higher rate of UAP reports. The most consistent and statistically significant finding was that reports of UAP sightings were more likely to occur within 30 km of military operations areas, where routine military training occurs.

=== Methodological issues ===
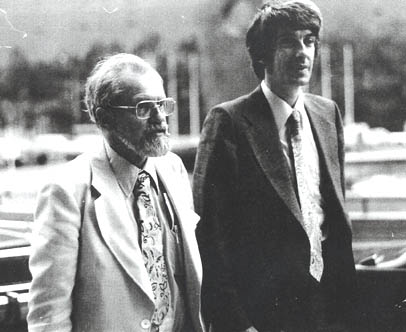
Josef Allen Hynek (left) and Jacques Vallée

Although some ufologists like Peter A. Sturrock have proposed explicit methodological activities for the investigation of UFOs, scientific UFO research is challenged by the facts that the phenomena are spatially and temporally unpredictable, are not reproducible, and lack tangible physicality. That most UFO sightings have mundane explanations limits interpretive power of "interesting", extraordinary UFO-related events, with the astronomer Carl Sagan writing: "The reliable cases are uninteresting and the interesting cases are unreliable. Unfortunately there are no cases that are both reliable and interesting." The ufologists J. Allen Hynek and Jacques Vallée have each developed descriptive systems for characterizing UFO sightings and, by extension, for organizing ufology investigations.

=== Phenomena linked to ufology ===
In addition to UFO sightings, certain supposedly related phenomena are of interest to some ufologists, including crop circles, cattle mutilations, anomalous materials, alien abductions and implants. Some ufologists have also promoted UFO conspiracy theories, including the Roswell Incident of 1947, the Majestic 12 documents, and UFO disclosure advocates. Skeptic Robert Sheaffer has accused ufology of having a "credulity explosion", writing that "the kind of stories generating excitement and attention in any given year would have been rejected by mainstream ufologists a few years earlier for being too outlandish." The physicist James E. McDonald also identified "cultism" and "extreme...subgroups" as negatively impacting ufology.

=== In Posadism ===
During the Cold War, ufology was synthesized with the ideas of a Trotskyist movement in South America known as Posadism. Posadism's main theorist, J. Posadas, believed the human race must "appeal to the beings on other planets ... to intervene and collaborate with Earth's inhabitants in suppressing poverty". Posadas wished to collaborate with extraterrestrials to create a socialist system on Earth. The adoption of this belief among Posadists, who had previously been a significant political force in South America, has been noted as a contributing factor in their decline.

== Governmental and private ufology studies ==
Starting in the 1940s, governmental agencies and private groups sponsored investigations, studies, and conferences related to ufology. Typically motivated by visual UFO sightings, the goals of these studies included critical evaluation of the observational evidence, attempts to resolve and identify the observed events, and the development of policy recommendations. These studies include Project Sign, Project Blue Book, the Robertson Panel, and the Condon Committee in the United States; Project Magnet and Project Second Storey in Canada; the Flying Saucer Working Party and Project Condign in Britain; GEIPAN in France; Operation Plate in Brazil, and Project Hessdalen in Norway. Private studies of UFO phenomena include those produced by the RAND Corporation in 1968, Harvey Rutledge of the University of Missouri from 1973 to 1980, and the National Press Club's Disclosure Project in 2001. Additionally, the United Nations from 1977 to 1979 sponsored meetings and hearings concerning UFO sightings. In August 2020, the United States Department of Defense established the Unidentified Aerial Phenomena Task Force to detect, analyze and catalog unidentified aerial phenomena that could potentially pose a threat to U.S. national security.

== UFO organizations and events ==
A large number of private organizations dedicated to the study, discussion, and publicity of ufology and other UFO-related topics exist worldwide, including in the United States, the United Kingdom, Australia, and Switzerland. Along with such "pro-UFO" groups are skeptic organizations that emphasize the pseudoscientific nature of ufology. During the annual World UFO Day (2 July), ufologists and associated organizations raise public awareness of ufology to "tell the truth about earthly visits from outer space aliens." The day's events include group gatherings to search for and observe UFOs.

== See also ==
- Identification studies of UFOs
- Grey alien
- Little green men
- Psychosocial hypothesis
- Interdimensional hypothesis
- Time-traveler hypothesis
- Cryptoterrestrial UFO hypothesis
- Fringe science
- List of topics characterized as pseudoscience
- List of reported UFO sightings
- List of Ufologists
- Close encounters
- UFOs in fiction
- UFO religion
