= Mutual UFO Network =

Organization centered around UFOs

- Founded: May 31, 1969; 57 years ago
- Type: Nonprofit organization
- Purpose: "The Scientific Study of UFOs for the Benefit of Humanity"
- Location: Cincinnati, Ohio
- Members: 4,000+
- Key people: David MacDonald, Executive Director; John F. Schuessler, Founder and Board Member; Barbra Schuessler Sobhani, Journal Editor; Ruben J. Uriarte, Deputy Director of Investigations
- Website: MUFON.com

The Mutual UFO Network (MUFON) is a US-based non-profit organization composed of civilian volunteers who study reported UFO sightings. It is one of the oldest and largest organizations of its kind, claiming more than 4,000 members worldwide with chapters and representatives in more than 43 countries and all 50 United States. The organization has been criticized for its focus on pseudoscience, and critics say its investigators fail to use the scientific method.

== History ==
MUFON, Inc. was originally established as the Midwest UFO Network on May 31, 1969, in Quincy, Illinois, by Allen R. Utke, Walter H. Andrus Jr., John F. Schuessler, and others. Most of MUFON's early members were associated with the SKYLOOK newsletter of Stover, Missouri and the Aerial Phenomena Research Organization (APRO), formerly of Sturgeon Bay, Wisconsin. MUFON was renamed the Mutual UFO Network in 1973 because of its expansion to other states and countries.

In 2013, Jan Harzan spoke at a UFO symposium. He was the executive director of MUFON at the time. During his talk, he said that something strange happened to him as a child. He claimed that a "humming" alien visited him when he was young.

In July 2020, Harzan was arrested in Newport Beach, California. The arrest was for trying to solicit sex from someone he thought was a 13-year-old girl. But the "girl" was actually an undercover law enforcement officer. In response to the arrest, MUFON leadership reported that Harzan had been "permanently removed" as the organization's Executive Director, and "[Harzan] will no longer serve any role in the organization."

== Operation ==
MUFON is currently headquartered in Cincinnati, Ohio, has chapters in every U.S. state, and claims to have over 4,000 members worldwide. It holds an annual international symposium and publishes the monthly MUFON UFO Journal. In 2015, MUFON founded Mutual UFO Network University, an unaccredited online institution which seeks to train members to investigate UFO sightings.

The group claims more than 500 field investigators and specialized teams to investigate possible physical evidence of extraterrestrial craft. The network trains volunteers to interview witnesses, perform research, and draw conclusions from the evidence. Although investigators are not paid, they must pass both an exam based on a 265-page manual, and a background check. MUFON features a newsroom and case management system on its website.

== Criticism ==
=== Pseudoscience ===
According to science writer Sharon A. Hill, MUFON's focus is "decidedly unscientific with talks on alien abduction, conspiracy theories, human-ET hybrids, hypnotic regression, and repressed memories", and reflects "a wide range of pseudoscience". MUFON has been the subject of criticism for drifting away from their original "nuts and bolts UFO investigation" into "bizarre conspiracy and exopolitics talk". The organization receives large numbers of UFO reports every year; the qualifications of the amateur volunteers examining the reports, however, have been questioned. Hill wrote that MUFON's idea of scientific researchers "appears to be people who are not scientists or propose fantastic, anti-science tales".

=== Officers and donors with far-right viewpoints ===
An April 2018 article in Newsweek reported evidence of "anti-immigrant, anti-trans, anti-Muslim and anti-Semitic sentiments" among MUFON officials, including MUFON donor J. Z. Knight and former MUFON State Director for Pennsylvania John Ventre, both of whom have publicly expressed racist and/or antisemitic views, and are described in the article as "high-tier Inner Circle donors to MUFON". The expressed far-right viewpoints "kicked off a wave of anger and resignations across MUFON", including former MUFON Director of Research Chris Cogswell (who stated, "My internal conscience would not let me continue") and former board member and Washington State Director James Clarkson (who stated, "Remaining in MUFON in any capacity is morally unacceptable.") Erica Lukes, former MUFON State Director for Utah, is also reported in the article as describing MUFON as "an organization unwilling to adequately address sexual harassment".

In 2020, Vice magazine reported that Ken Pfeifer, head of MUFON's Rhode Island chapter, posted racist memes and comments on Facebook during the height of national Black Lives Matter protests.

== Popular culture ==
MUFON has been mentioned in:

=== Television ===
- The 2008 Discovery Channel documentary miniseries UFOs Over Earth
- The 2008 History Channel series UFO Hunters
- The X-Files series
- The History Channel's series Ancient Aliens
- Hangar 1: The UFO Files series
- 9-1-1: Lone Star series, season 3 episode 6 "The ATX-Files"

=== News ===
- The New York Times article "People Are Seeing U.F.O.s Everywhere, and This Book Proves It"
- Forbes article "MUFON, America's UFO Experts, Discuss Roswell And Possible Cover-Ups"
