= David Clarke (journalist) =

British folklorist and writer (born 1967)

David William Clarke
- Born: 1967 (age 58–59)

Academic background
- Education: University of Sheffield; NCTJ
- Thesis: The head cult : tradition and folklore surrounding the symbol of the severed human head in the British Isles. (1998)

Academic work
- Institutions: Sheffield Hallam University
- Website: drdavidclarke.co.uk

David William Clarke (born 1967) is an investigative journalist, reader and lecturer at Sheffield Hallam University, England. He has a lifelong interest in folklore, Fortean phenomena and extraordinary personal experiences. He is frequently consulted by the national and international media on contemporary legend and UFOs and acted as curator for The National Archives UFO project from 2008 to 2013.

== Education ==
Clarke graduated with a BA (Hons) from the University of Sheffield in 1990 in Archaeology, Prehistory and Medieval History. In 1998, He received a PhD in English Cultural Tradition and Folklore from the University of Sheffield. He obtained the National Certificate qualification in Newspaper Journalism from the National Council for the Training of Journalists (NCTJ) in 1992 and is a member of the Association of Journalism Educators (AJE) and a fellow of the Higher Education Academy (FHEA).

== Career ==
From 1991 Clarke worked as a news reporter and news editor for the Rotherham Advertiser, Sheffield Star and Yorkshire Post. From 2000 to 2004 he worked as a Press Officer in the civil service. In 2005 he joined the Department of Media, Arts and Communication at Sheffield Hallam University, becoming course leader for Journalism in 2010 and Reader/Principal Lecturer in 2015.

In 2020 he was promoted to Associate Professor, He continues his research role in the Sheffield Creative Industries Institute (SCII) at Sheffield Hallam University.

He teaches Media Law and Regulation on the university's undergraduate and postgraduate journalism courses. He also contributes to modules on the history of journalism, investigative reporting and court reporting and supervises PhD students.

== Academic Research ==
Clarke's research is focused upon his joint interests in folklore and journalism.

In 2018 Clarke, alongside his colleagues Dr Diane Rodgers and Andrew Robinson, launched the Centre for Contemporary Legend research (CCL) at Sheffield Hallam University.

In 2024 the UKRI Arts & Humanities Research Council awarded Clarke 'Catalyst' funding for a 2-year project that will create a National Folklore Survey for England. Clarke leads the project alongside a team of academic folklorists including Dr Diane A. Rodgers (SHU); Professor Owen Davies and Dr Ceri Houlbrook (University of Hertfordshire); and US sociology professor Christopher Bader, of Chapman University. The survey updates the last national folklore survey for England that was launched in 1964 at Sheffield University's Centre for English Cultural Tradition and Language (CECTAL), where Clarke completed his PhD. The launch of the project was announced by The Observer newspaper on 20 October 2024.

== Journalism and Publications ==
Since the 1990s much of Clarke's journalism has concentrated on investigations of British government policy on UFOs/UAPs, working from documents opened at the UK National Archives. From 1998 he used the UK's Freedom of Information Act 2000 (FOIA) to gain access to closed UFO files held by the Ministry of Defence (MoD). This resulted in the release of the file on the famous Rendlesham Forest UFO incident in Suffolk, the MoD's report by the Flying Saucer Working Party used to brief Winston Churchill and, in 2006, the DIS report UAPs in the UK Air Defence Region (also known as the Condign report).

Between 2008 and 2013 Clarke acted as the media consultant and spokesperson for the Open Government project that oversaw the transfer of 210 public records on UFOs from the Ministry of Defence to The National Archives.

The project resulted in the public release of 60,000 pages of reports, correspondence and policy material on UFO-related issues in ten tranches. This material is available via the project website. At the completion of the project in 2018 Dr Clarke presented a public lecture at The National Archives; this is available as a podcast from the TNA website.

In 2022 Clarke was instrumental in both discovering and publishing the only extant original photograph of the infamous Calvine UFO sighting, along with the only contemporary witness account of the event provided by former RAF press officer Craig Lindsay.

Clarke's work on the MoD's UFO files and other archival material on unusual phenomena have been published in a series of books including Out of the Shadows: UFOs, the Establishment and the official cover-up (with Andy Roberts, 2002); Flying Saucerers: a social history of UFOlogy (with Andy Roberts, 2006); The UFO Files: The Inside Story of Real-Life Sightings (2009, second edition 2012); How UFOs Conquered the World: The history of a modern myth (2015); and UFO Drawings from The National Archives (2017).

His books on folklore, Fortean studies and contemporary legend include Twilight of the Celtic Gods (with Andy Roberts, 1996); The Angel of Mons (2004); and Britain’s X-traordinary Files (2014).

== Media work ==
Clarke has made numerous media appearances to discuss UFO-related material. Clarke's media work has included the two-part series Britain’s X-Files for BBC Radio 4 and a BBC Timewatch programme on Britain's UFO files shown in 2004.

He also appeared with former British Defence Minister Michael Portillo on Portillo’s State Secrets (2015) and Channel 5's Portillo's Hidden History of Britain (2018).

His freelance journalism has appeared in a variety of UK and international newspapers, magazines and journals including The Guardian, Folklore, Contemporary Legend, and BBC History.

He also regularly contribute features based on his research into anomalous phenomena and folklore to both The Fortean Times and the Daily Mail.

== Personal life ==
He is married to Carolyn Waudby, a poet and journalist.

== Selected bibliography ==
- Twilight of the Celtic Gods: Exploration of Britain's Hidden Pagan Traditions. Blandford. ISBN 978-0713725223
- Out Of The Shadows: UFOs, the Establishment and the Official Cover Up. Piatkus. ISBN 978-0749922900.
- The Angel of Mons: Phantom Soldiers and Ghostly Guardians. John Wiley. ISBN 978-0470862780
- The UFO Files: The Inside Story of Real-life Sightings. Bloomsbury. ISBN 978-1408164891
- Britain's X-Traordinary Files. Bloomsbury. ISBN 978-1472904935.
- How UFOs Conquered the World: The History of a Modern Myth. Aurum Press. ISBN 978-1781313039
- UFO Drawings From The National Archives. ISBN 978-1909829091

== See also ==
- Category:English folklore
- Project Condign
