= TR3 =

TR 3 or TR3 or TR-3 may refer to:

== Aeronautics ==
- TR-3 Black Manta, a presumed spyplane and black program by the USAF
- Lyulka TR-3, a 1940s Soviet jet engine
- TR.3, a 1940s Canadian jet engine design study

== Other uses ==
- Tomb Raider III, the third game in the Tomb Raider series
- TR3 (band), the Tim Reynolds Trio
- Triumph TR3, a car from the United Kingdom
- TR3, a postal district in the United Kingdom's TR postcode area
- .tr3, a file extension format for the TomeRaider ebook reader
- Tier 3 (nightclub)
- TR3 Racing, an American auto racing team
- Nuclear receptor 4A1, a biological transcription factor sometimes called TR3

== See also ==
- TR3A (disambiguation)
