= UFOs: Seeing Is Believing =

- DVD cover
- Written by: Mark Obenhaus
- Directed by: Mark Obenhaus
- Narrated by: Peter Jennings
- Music by: Ben Decter
- Country of origin: United States
- Original language: English

Production
- Producers: Jordan Kronick; Gabrielle Tenenbaum
- Cinematography: Erich Roland
- Editors: Peter Livingston; Philip Shane
- Running time: 120 minutes (with commercials)

Original release
- Network: ABC
- Release: February 24, 2005

UFOs: Seeing Is Believing is a two-hour American television special documentary film that aired on ABC on February 24, 2005. The program is narrated by Peter Jennings and features UFOs. It was produced by PJ Productions and Springs Media for ABC News.

The documentary mentions:

- UFO sightings (Kenneth Arnold sighting, Phoenix Lights, Illinois police "black triangle" sighting incident): features CSICOP scientific consultant James McGaha, Seth Shostak and Jill Tarter of the SETI Institute, J. Allen Hynek
- the alleged Roswell UFO incident: features clips from Unsolved Mysteries and X-Files; Stanton Friedman
- alien abductions: features clip from Taken; hypnotist Hopkins, psychologist Susan Clancy
- space travel: features clips from Star Wars: Episode II – Attack of the Clones and Star Trek; Michio Kaku

The documentary has since aired on the National Geographic Channel.
