= Project Condign =

British government study of UFOs (1997–2000)

Cover page

Project Condign was a secret unidentified flying object (UFO) study undertaken by the British Government's Defence Intelligence Staff (DIS) between 1997 and 2000.

The results of Project Condign were compiled into a 400-page document titled Unidentified Aerial Phenomena in the UK Air Defence Region that drew on approximately 10,000 sightings and reports that had been gathered by the DI55, a section of the Directorate of Scientific and Technical Intelligence (DSTI) within the DIS. It was released into the public domain on 15 May 2006 after a September 2005 Freedom of Information Act request by UFO researchers David Clarke, a lecturer at Sheffield Hallam University, and Gary Anthony, a former BUFORA astronomical consultant. The identity of the report's author/s was not made public.

== Conclusions ==
=== UFOs ===
The report concluded that UFOs had an observable presence that was “indisputable”, but also that no evidence has been found to suggest they are "hostile or under any type of control". According to its author/s the majority of analyzed UFO sightings can be explained by the misidentification of common objects such as aircraft and balloons, while the remaining unexplainable reports were most likely the result of supranormal meteorological phenomena not fully understood by modern science. This phenomenon is referred to in the report as "Buoyant Plasma Formation," akin to Ball Lightning, and is hypothesized to produce an unexplained energy field which creates the appearance of a Black Triangle by refracting light. The electromagnetic fields generated by plasma phenomena are also hypothesized to explain reports of close encounters due to inducing perceptual alterations or hallucinations in those affected. The Condign report suggests that further research into "novel military applications" of this plasma phenomenon is warranted, and that "the implications have already been briefed to the relevant MoD technology managers." The report also notes that scientists in the former Soviet Union have identified the close connection between the 'UFO Phenomena' and Plasma technologies," and are "pursuing related techniques for potential military purposes."

=== Close encounters ===
The report described people who believed themselves to have had close encounters as being convinced of what they said that they had seen or experienced, but also as not representing proof that such encounters were real. It attributed a number of cases to the “close proximity of plasma related fields” which it said could “adversely affect a vehicle or person".

== Reaction ==
According to Clarke, the release of the documents did not shed any new light on UFOs or the UFO phenomenon, but did show that the DIS had been conducting a far larger investigation of the topic than it had previously revealed. Due to the secret nature of the report, it was apparently not subject to peer review, and it has been suggested that the "buoyant plasma" hypothesis would not have withstood independent scrutiny.
