= The UFO Files =

Book by David Clarke

- Author: David Clarke
- Language: English
- Genre: Non-fiction
- Publisher: The National Archives
- Publication date: 2009

The UFO Files: The Inside Story of Real-Life Sightings, published by The National Archives in 2009, is an official history of British UFO reports. The author, David Clarke, is a senior lecturer in journalism at Sheffield Hallam University. The book delves into the United Kingdom's historical relationship with unidentified flying objects (UFOs) and the public's fascination with extraterrestrial phenomena.

The book includes a detailed analysis of declassified UFO files from the Ministry of Defence, covering a period from the 1950s to the early 2000s. Topics include alleged UFO sightings, official investigations, and the Ministry of Defence evolving stance on the potential threat posed by UFOs. Notable cases, such as the Rendlesham Forest Incident and the Battle of Los Angeles, are explored within the context of public fear and Cold War paranoia.

David Clarke frames this narrative with skepticism, adding emphasis on the role of social and cultural factors in shaping UFO myths. His work is grounded in journalism and archival research, drawing connections between UFO phenomena and broader issues like government transparency and public trust in official institutions.

The book was published during an international wave of UFO document declassification, coinciding with similar efforts by the United States, Canada, and France. These actions were aimed to demystify UFO sightings and address the public's curiosity about government knowledge of extraterrestrial life.

The UFO Files remains an important resource for researchers and enthusiasts interested in the history of UFOs in the UK. Its publication marked a turning point in the public's access to previously classified government documents on the subject.

The book forms part of an international programme of declassification of UFO documents. Clarke has worked at The National Archives as a consultant on this subject since 2008.
