= TR3A =

TR3A may refer to:

- Triumph TR3A, automobile from the United Kingdom
- TR-3A Black Manta, speculated USAF spyplane
