= Unidentified flying object =

Apparent unusual observation in the sky

"GIMBAL" Pentagon UFO video, January 2015

An unidentified flying object (UFO) is an object or phenomenon seen in the sky but not yet identified or explained. The term was coined when United States Air Force (USAF) investigations into flying saucers found too broad a range of shapes reported to consider them all saucers or discs. In more recent times, UFOs have also sometimes been designated as unidentified aerial phenomena or unidentified anomalous phenomena (UAPs). On investigation, most UFOs are identified as known objects, natural phenomena, hoaxes, or mirages, and the small number that remain unexplained, while subject to intense speculation by some enthusiasts, have not been convincingly shown to be something other than such.

While unusual sightings in the sky have been reported since at least the 3rd century BC, UFOs became culturally prominent after World War II, escalating during the Space Age. Studies and investigations into UFO reports conducted by governments (such as Project Blue Book in the United States and Project Condign in the United Kingdom), as well as by organisations and individuals have occurred over the years without confirmation of the fantastical claims of small but vocal groups of ufologists who favour unconventional or pseudoscientific hypotheses, often claiming that UFOs are evidence of extraterrestrial intelligence, technologically advanced cryptids, interdimensional contact, future time travelers, demons or the Dead.

After decades of promotion of such ideas by believers and in popular media, the kind of evidence required to solidly support such claims has not been forthcoming. Scientists and skeptic organizations such as the Committee for Skeptical Inquiry have provided prosaic explanations for UFOs, namely that they are caused by natural phenomena, human technology, delusions, and hoaxes. Although certain beliefs surrounding UFOs have inspired parts of new religions, social scientists have identified the ongoing interest and storytelling surrounding UFOs as a modern example of folklore and mythology understandable with psychosocial explanations.

The problems of temporarily or permanently non-knowable anomalous phenomenon or perceived objects in flight is part of the philosophical subject epistemology. The U.S. government has two entities dedicated to UFO data collection and analysis: NASA's UAP independent study team and the Department of Defense All-domain Anomaly Resolution Office.

== Terminology and prevalence of belief ==
During the late 1940s and through the 1950s, UFOs were often called "flying saucers" or "flying discs" based on reporting of the Kenneth Arnold incident. "Unidentified flying object" (UFO) has been in-use since 1947. The acronym "UFO" was coined by Captain Edward J. Ruppelt for the USAF. He wrote, "Obviously the term 'flying saucer' is misleading when applied to objects of every conceivable shape and performance. For this reason the military prefers the more general, if less colorful, name: unidentified flying objects. UFO".

The term UFO became widespread during the 1950s, at first in technical literature, but later in popular use. "Unidentified aerial phenomenon" (UAP) first appeared in the late 1960s. UAP has seen increasing usage in the 21st century due to negative cultural associations with "UFO". UAP is sometimes expanded as "unidentified anomalous phenomenon". While technically a UFO refers to any unidentified flying object, in modern popular culture the term UFO has generally become synonymous with alien spacecraft. The term "extra-terrestrial vehicle" (ETV) is sometimes used to separate this explanation of UFOs from totally earthbound explanations.

A 1995 Scripps poll found 50% of Americans "believe" in UFOs, while Newsweek reported a poll where 48% opined that "reports of UFOs are real". A 2012 survey found 36% US population believe UFOs are real. A 2017 Huffpo/YouGov poll found 48% believed UFOs could be a sign of aliens visiting Earth, while only 35% rejected the idea. A 2021 Gallup poll found 41% of Americans believed some UFOs involve alien spacecraft; Pew found 51% felt UFOs are "likely evidence of intelligent life outside Earth." The prevalence of UFOs belief led University of Leicester Professor of Media Barrie Gunter to observe: "even though Ufology enthusiasts have often been dismissed as quacks, there is a silent plurality of people who believe that they might be on to something".

== Identification ==
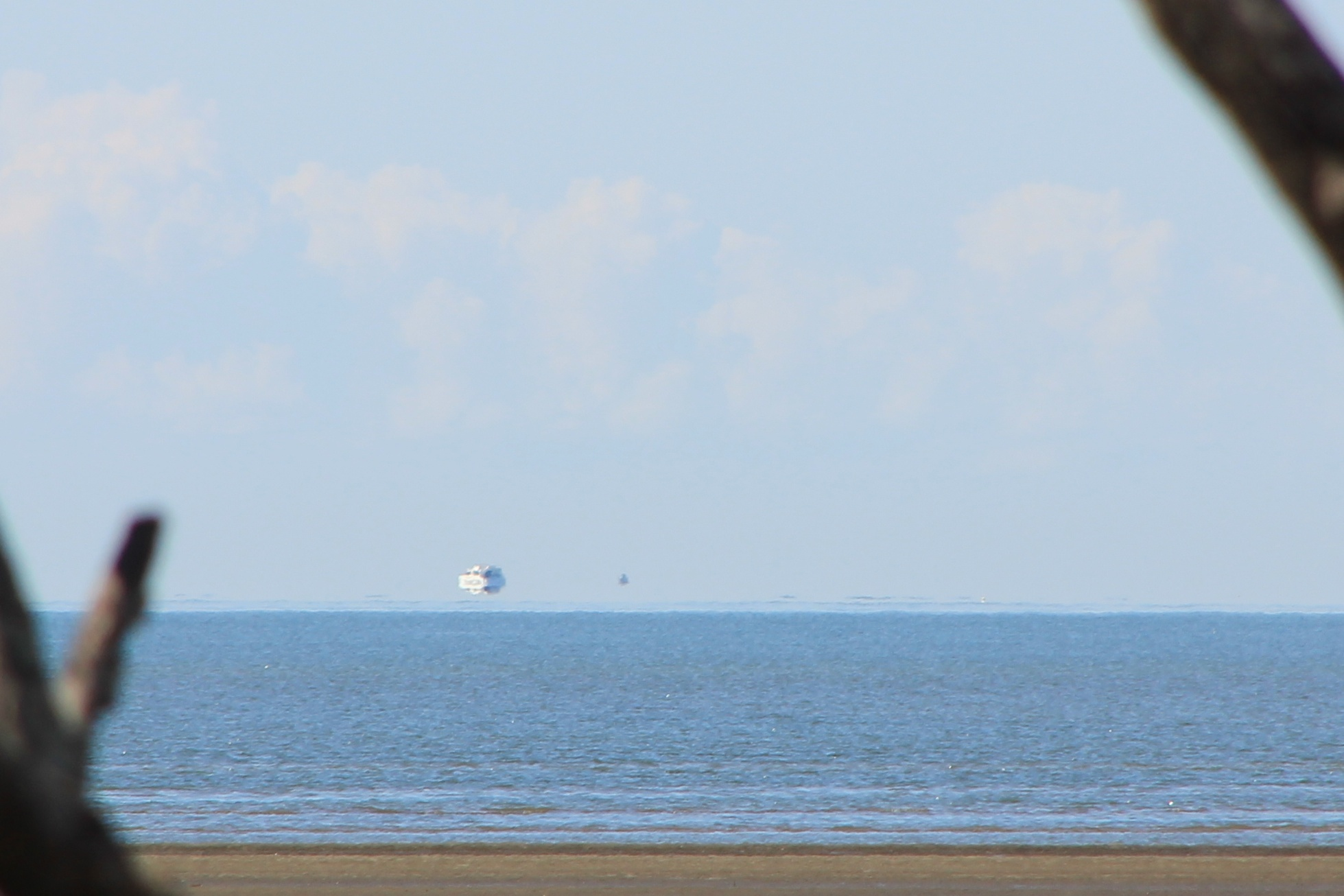
A Fata Morgana, a type of mirage in which objects located below the astronomical horizon appear to be hovering in the sky just above the horizon, may be responsible for some UFO sightings.

Studies show that after careful investigation, the majority of UFOs can be identified as ordinary objects or phenomena. The 1952–1955 study for the USAF used the following categories: "Balloon; Astronomical; Aircraft; Light phenomenon; Birds, Clouds, dust, etc.; Insufficient information; Psychological manifestations; Unknown; and Other". Identified sources of UFO reports are:

- Aircraft (including military, civilian, and experimental aircraft as well as such peculiarities as aerial advertising, missile and other rocket launches, artificial satellites, the International Space Station, re-entering spacecraft including space debris, kites, and various unmanned aerial vehicles often popularly termed "drones")
- Astronomical objects (bright stars, bolides, bright planets, and the Moon)
- Balloons (surveillance balloons, toy balloons, weather balloons, large research balloons, and sky lanterns)
- Hoaxes. On occasion, they might even be computer-generated.
- Light phenomena (mirages, Fata Morgana, sundogs, ball lightning, moon dogs, satellite flares, lens flare, searchlights and other ground lights, etc.)
- Other atmospheric objects and phenomena (birds, unusual clouds, flares, plasma)
- Psychological effects (pareidolia, suggestibility and false memories, mass psychogenic disorders, optical illusions, and hallucinations)

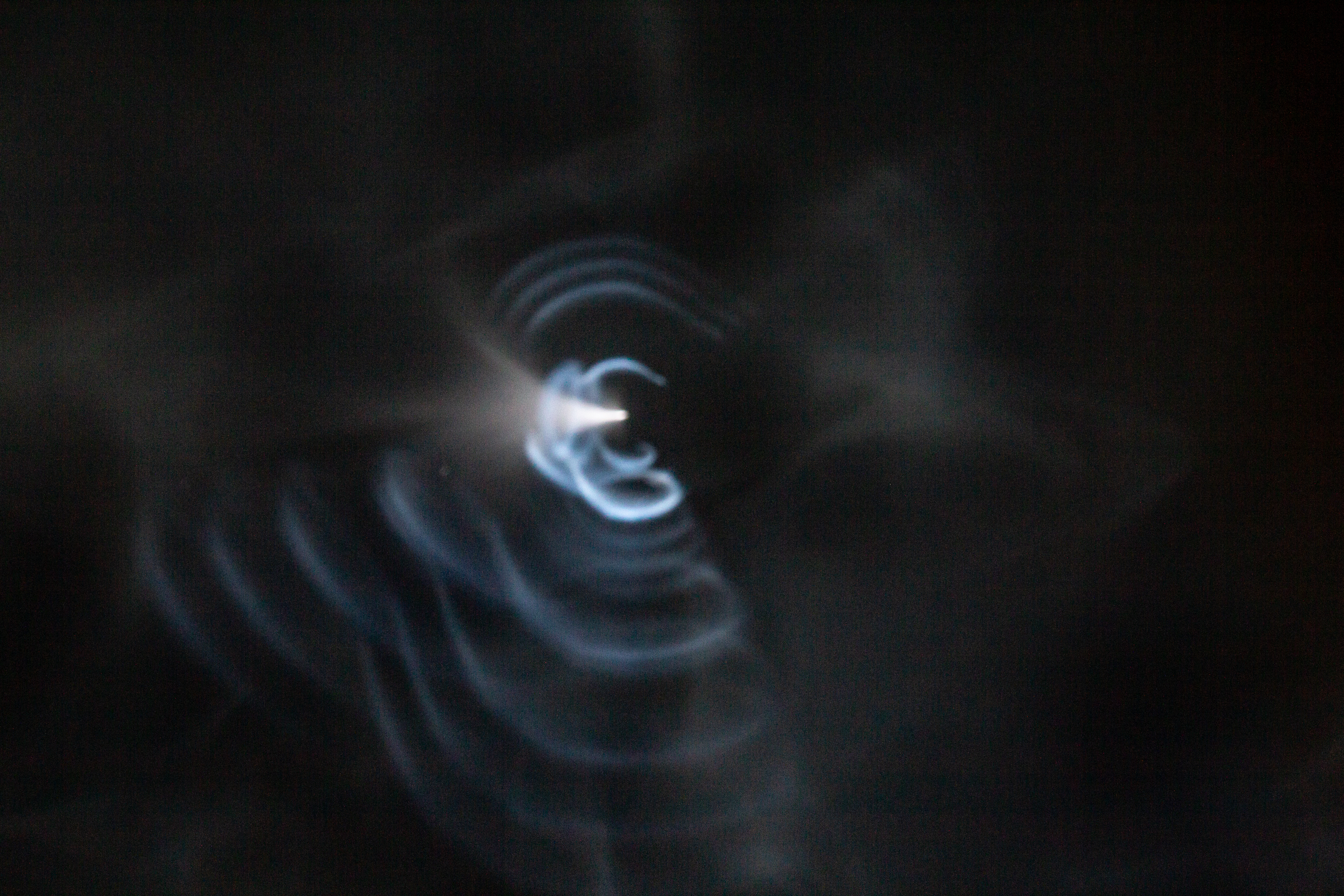
Twilight phenomenon from a Falcon 9 rocket launch

An individual 1979 study by CUFOS researcher Allan Hendry found, as did other investigations, that fewer than one percent of cases he investigated were hoaxes and most sightings were actually honest misidentifications of prosaic phenomena. Hendry attributed most of these to inexperience or misperception. Astronomer Andrew Fraknoi, noting his and other astronomers' typical rejection of the claims that UFOs are extraterrestrial spacecraft, argued that the best response to the "onslaught of credulous coverage" in books, films and entertainment was to apply critical thinking to such claims, advising that "being a good scientist is not unlike being a good detective". Fraknoi pointed out that although UFO reports "might at first seem mysterious... the more you investigate, the more likely you are to find that there is LESS to these stories than meets the eye".

== History ==
=== Early history before the 20th century ===
People have always observed the sky and have sometimes seen what, to some, appeared to be unusual sights including phenomena as varied as comets, bright meteors, one or more of the five planets that can be readily seen with the naked eye, planetary conjunctions, and atmospheric optical phenomena such as parhelia and lenticular clouds. One particularly famous example is Halley's Comet: first recorded by Chinese astronomers in 240 BC and possibly as early as 467 BC as a strange and unknown "guest light" in the sky.

As a bright comet that visits the inner solar system every 76 years, it was often identified as a unique isolated event in ancient historical documents whose authors were unaware that it was a repeating phenomenon. Such accounts in history often were treated as supernatural portents, angels, or other religious omens. While UFO enthusiasts have sometimes commented on the narrative similarities between certain religious symbols in medieval paintings and UFO reports, the canonical and symbolic character of such images is documented by art historians placing more conventional religious interpretations on such images. Some examples of pre-contemporary reports about unusual aerial phenomena include:

- Seneca the Younger (c. 4 BC–65 AD), in his Naturales quaestiones, mentioned clipei flagrantes ("flaming shields") among luminous phenomena observed in the sky. In Book I (1.15), he listed "shields and many other kinds of fires" (clipei quoque et alia complura ignium genera), while in Book VII (20.2) he referred to clipei ardentes or clipei flagrantes ("burning" or "flaming shields") as celestial phenomena worthy of natural investigation.
- Pliny the Elder (23/24–79 AD), in his Naturalis historia (Book II, 100), used the term clipeus ("shield") in reference to an unusual celestial phenomenon, describing a clipeus ardens ("fiery shield") that crossed the sky from west to east at sunset: "a fiery, sparkling shield flew across from the west to the east at sunset". The passage is one of the earliest Latin accounts of a "shield-like" object appearing in the sky, although it has generally been interpreted by scholars as a description of a natural atmospheric or astronomical phenomenon rather than an extraordinary craft.
- Julius Obsequens was a Roman writer who is believed to have lived in the middle of the fourth century AD. The only work associated with his name is the Liber de prodigiis (Book of Prodigies), completely extracted from an epitome, or abridgment, written by Livy; De prodigiis was constructed as an account of the wonders and portents that occurred in Rome between 249 and 12 BCE. An aspect of Obsequens' work that has inspired excitement in some UFO enthusiasts is that he makes reference to things moving through the sky. The descriptions provided bear resemblance to observations of meteor showers. Obsequens was also writing some 400 years after the events he described, thus the text is not an eyewitness account. No corroboration with those amazing sights of old with contemporary observations was mentioned in that work.
- Shen Kuo (1031–1095), a Song Chinese government scholar-official and prolific polymath inventor, wrote a vivid passage in his Dream Pool Essays (1088) about an unidentified flying object. He recorded the testimony of eyewitnesses in 11th-century Anhui and Jiangsu (especially in the city of Yangzhou), who stated that a flying object with opening doors would shine a blinding light from its interior (from an object shaped like a pearl) that would cast shadows from trees for ten miles in radius, and was able to take off at tremendous speeds.
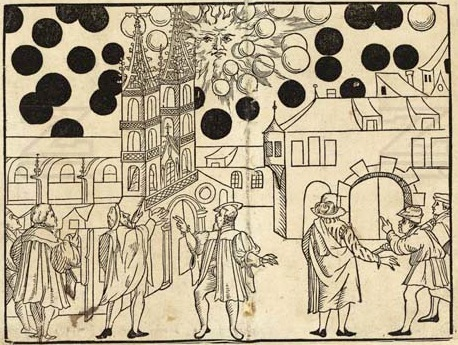
  The celestial phenomenon over Basel in 1566.
- A woodcut by Hans Glaser that appeared in a broadsheet in 1561 has been featured in popular culture as the "celestial phenomenon over Nuremberg" and connected to various ancient astronaut claims. Skeptic and debunker Jason Colavito argues that the woodcut is "a secondhand depiction of a particularly gaudy sundog", a known atmospheric optical phenomenon. A similar report comes from 1566 over Basel and, indeed, in the 15th and 16th centuries, many leaflets wrote of "miracles" and "sky spectacles" which bear resemblance to natural phenomena which were only more fully characterized after the scientific revolution.
- On January 25, 1878, the Denison Daily News printed an article in which John Martin, a local farmer, had reported seeing a large, dark, circular object resembling a balloon flying "at wonderful speed". Martin, according to the newspaper account, said it appeared to be about the size of a saucer from his perspective, one of the first uses of the word "saucer" in association with a UFO. At the time, ballooning was becoming an increasingly popular and sophisticated endeavor, and the first controlled-flights of such devices were occurring around that time.
UFO-like alleged sightings before the 20th century

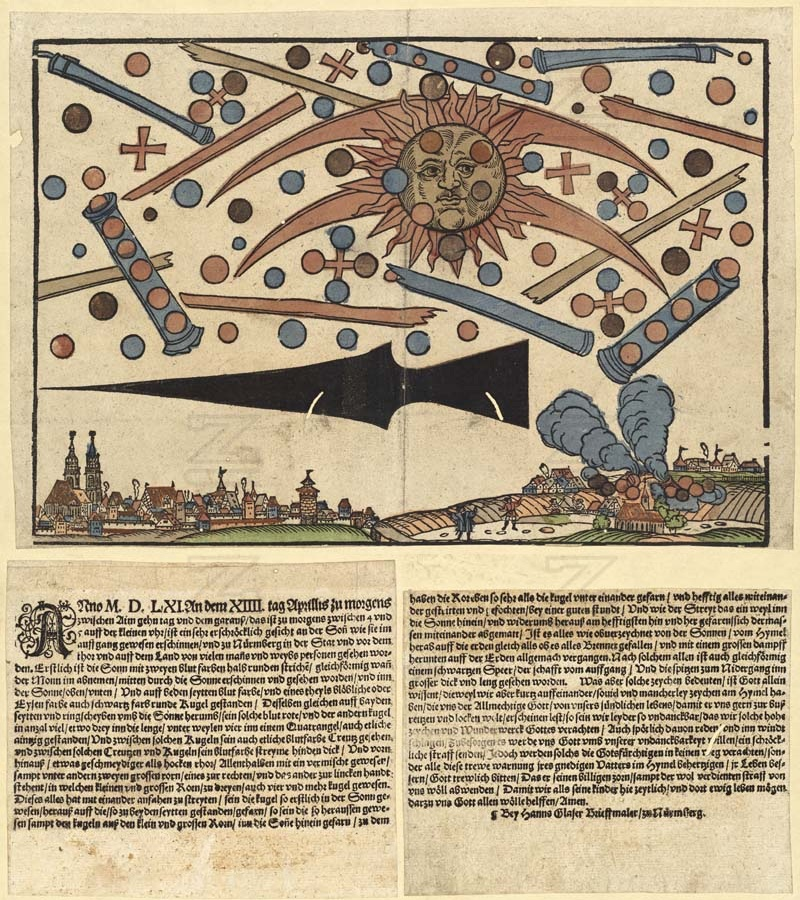
1561 celestial phenomenon over Nuremberg as printed in an illustrated news notice.

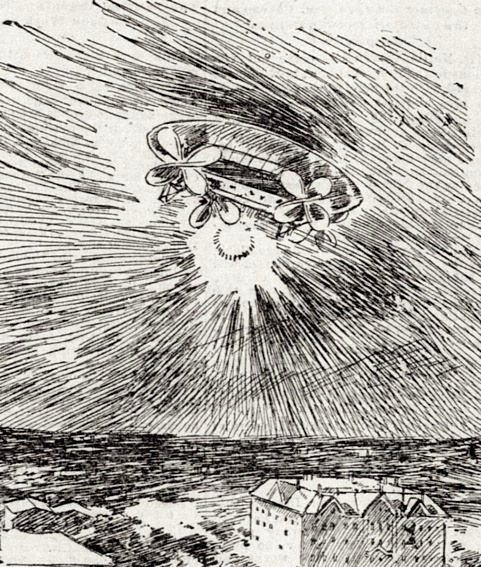
November 22, 1896 illustration of a "mystery airship" published in The San Francisco Call

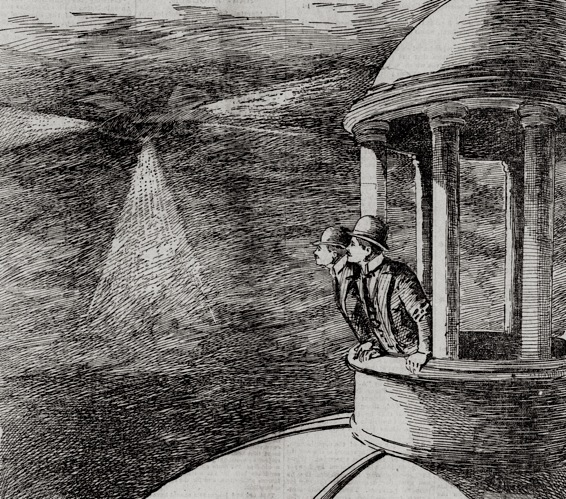
November 29, 1896 illustration of another "mystery airship" published in The San Francisco Call

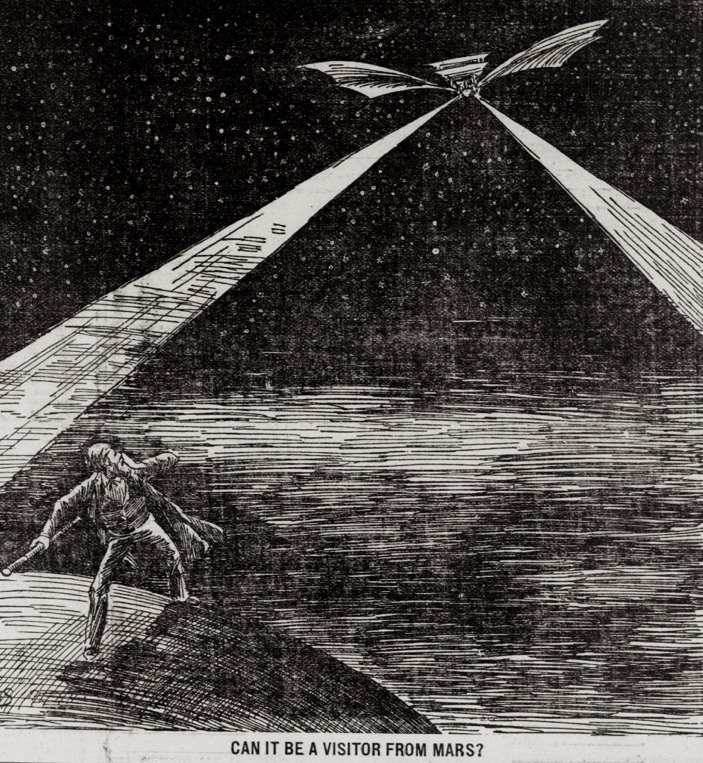
"Mystery airship" illustrated in The St. Paul Globe, April 13, 1897

- From November 1896 to April 1897, United States newspapers carried numerous reports of "mystery airships" that are reminiscent of modern UFO waves. Scores of people even reported talking to the pilots. Some people feared that Thomas Edison had created an artificial star that could fly around the country. On April 16, 1897, a letter was found that purported to be an enciphered communication between an airship operator and Edison. When asked his opinion of such reports, Edison said, "You can take it from me that it is a pure fake." The coverage of Edison's denial marked the end of major newspaper coverage of the airships in this period.

=== 20th century ===
In the Pacific and European theatres during World War II, round, glowing fireballs known as "foo fighters" were reported by Allied and Axis pilots. Some explanations for these sightings included St. Elmo's fire, the planet Venus, hallucinations from oxygen deprivation, and German secret weapons (specifically rockets). In 1946, more than 2,000 reports were collected, primarily by the Swedish military, of unidentified aerial objects over the Scandinavian nations, along with isolated reports from France, Portugal, Spain, Italy, and Greece. The objects were referred to as "Russian hail" (and later as "ghost rockets") because it was thought the mysterious objects were possibly Russian tests of captured German V1 or V2 rockets, but most were identified as natural phenomena as meteors.

Science fiction depictions of spacecraft similar to flying saucers before the first widely-reported UFO sighting in 1947

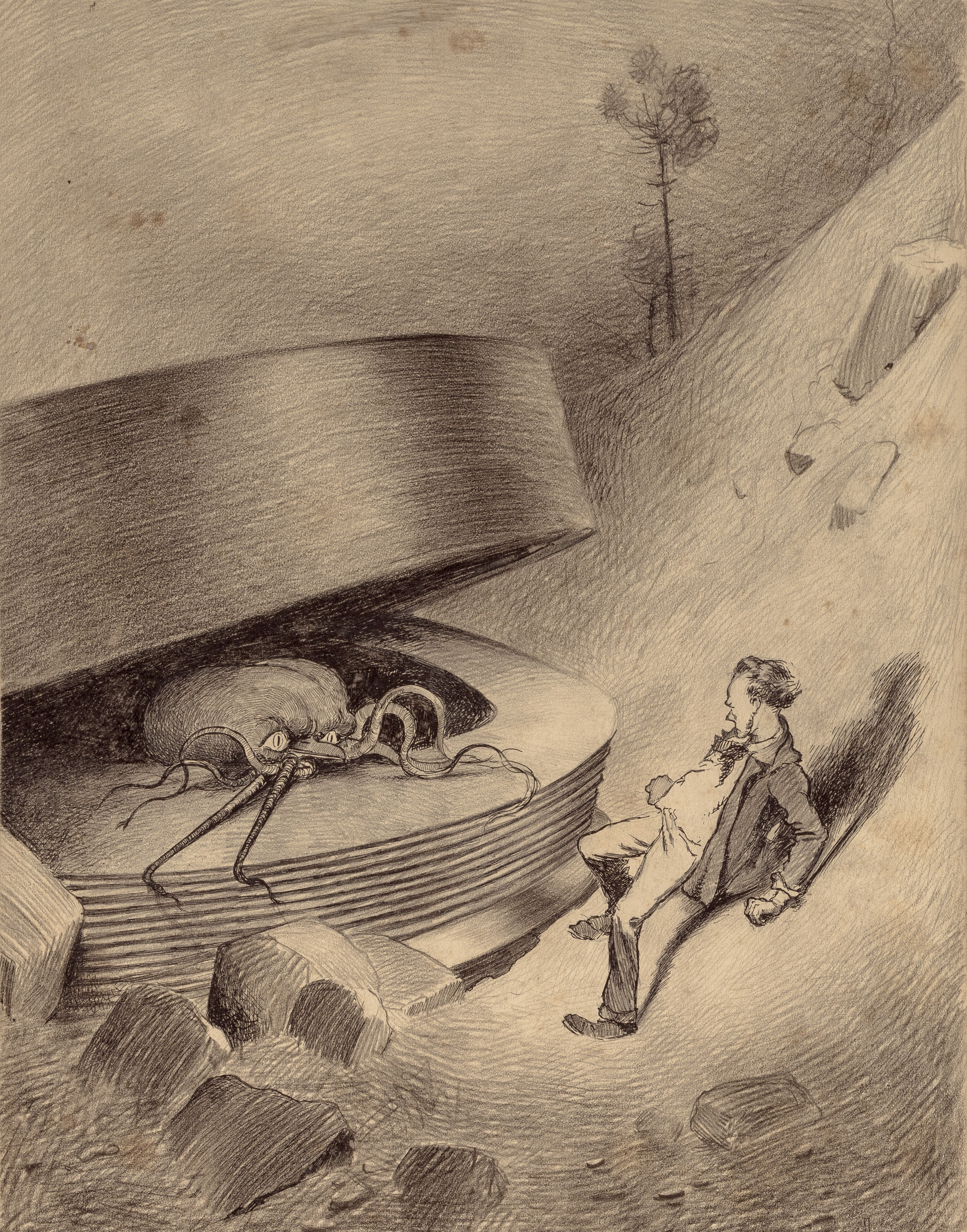
Illustration from 1903 by Henrique Alvim Corrêa showing the first Martian emerging from a cylinder that had fallen from the sky for an edition of The War of the Worlds by H. G. Wells.

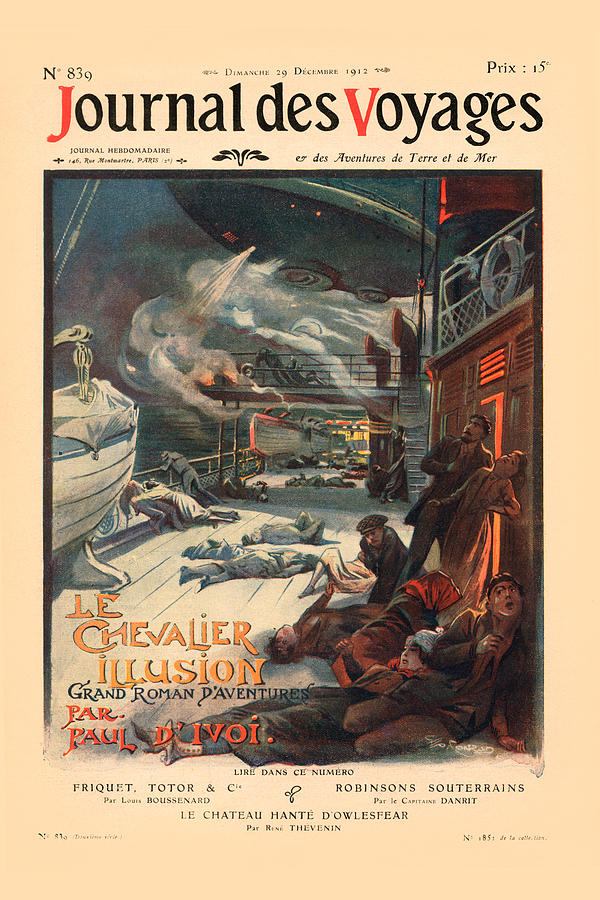
Cover of French pulp magazine Le Chevalier Illusion from December 29, 1912 portraying a flying machine spreading a toxic gas among the passengers and crew of a ship below

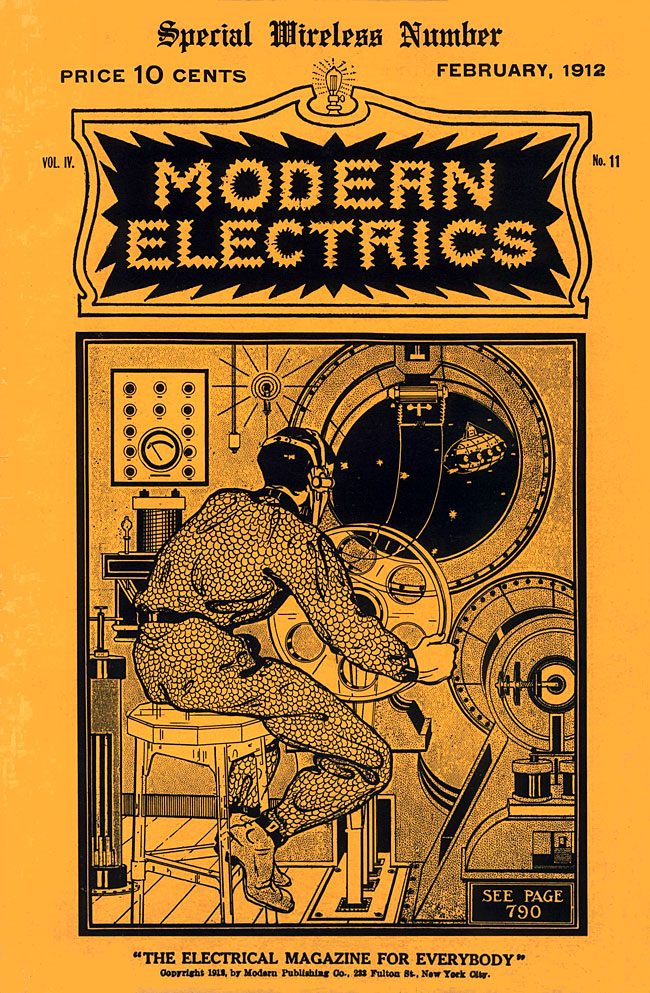
A "space flyer" depicted on the February 1912 cover of Modern Electrics as an illustration for the science fiction story Ralph 124C 41+ by Hugo Gernsback

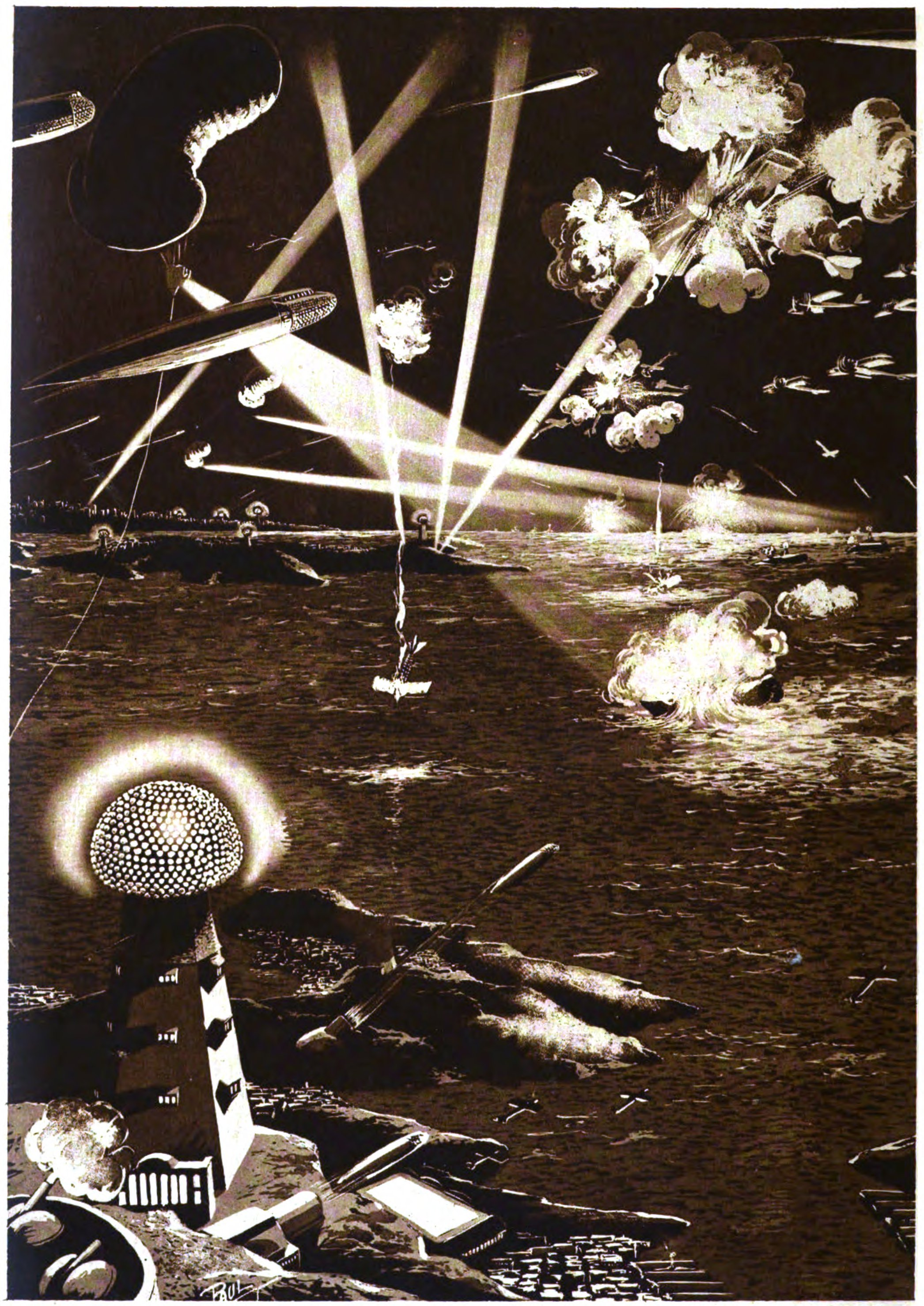
Illustration by Frank R. Paul from February 1922 in Science and Invention showing Nikola Tesla's vision of warfare in the future with sea and air craft "controlled and directed" by radio waves

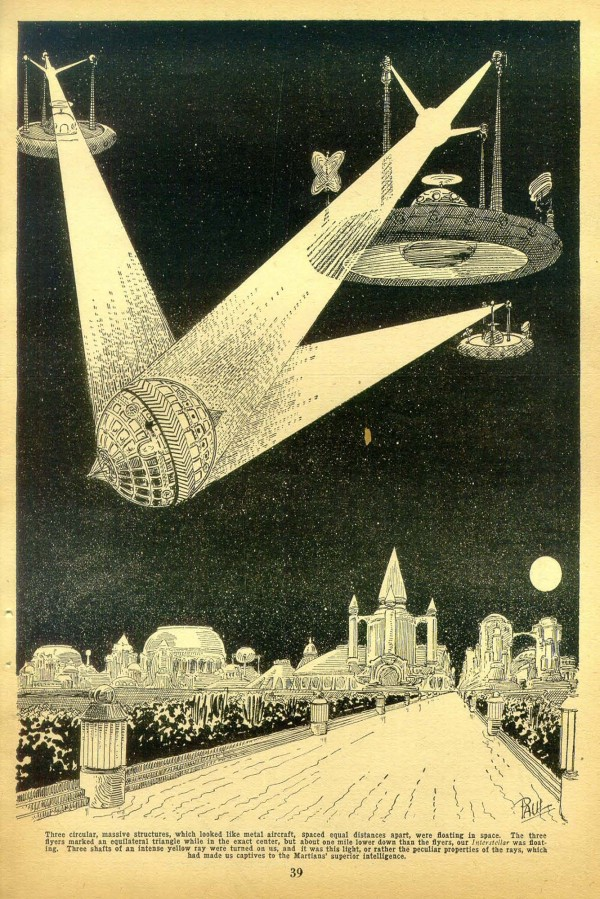
Illustration for a story by Hugo Gernsback in pulp science fiction magazine Amazing Stories from April 1928 (originally published on 1915 with similar illustrations in The Electrical Experimenter)

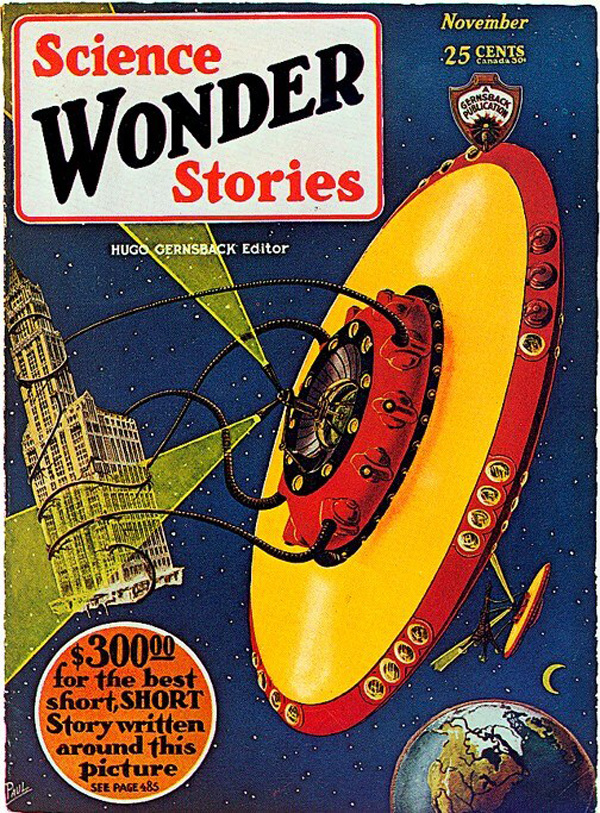
Depiction of a flying saucer by illustrator Frank R. Paul on the October 1929 issue of Hugo Gernsback's pulp science fiction magazine Science Wonder Stories

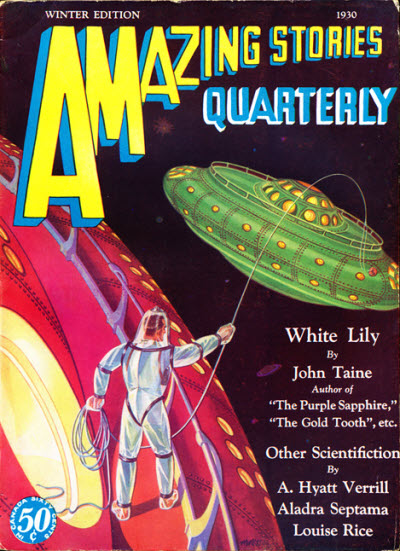
Cover of Amazing Stories winter 1930 issue depicting a disc-shaped spacecraft

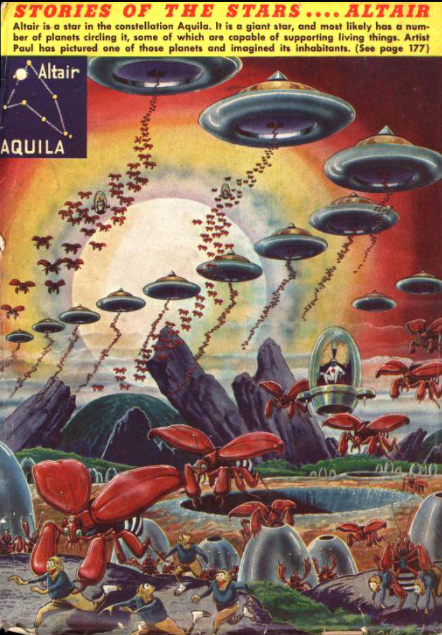
Back cover of Amazing Stories illustrated by Frank R. Paul in August 1946 featuring many disc-shaped spacecraft (published about a year before the flying disc wave of 1947)

Many scholars, especially those arguing for the psychosocial UFO hypothesis, have noted that UFO characteristics reported after the first widely publicized modern sighting by Kenneth Arnold in 1947 resembled a host of science fiction tropes from earlier in the century. By most accounts, the popular UFO craze in the US began with a media frenzy surrounding the reports on June 24, 1947, of a civilian pilot named Kenneth Arnold who described seeing "a group of bat-like aircraft flying in formation at high speeds" near Mount Rainier that he said were "moving like a saucer would if skipped across water" which led to headlines about "flying saucers" and "flying discs". Only weeks after Arnold's story was reported in 1947, Gallup published a poll asking people in the United States what the "flying saucers" might be. Already, 90% had heard of the new term. However, as reported by historian Greg Eghanian, "a majority either had no idea what they could be or thought that witnesses were mistaken" while "visitors from space were not initially among the options that anyone had in mind, and Gallup didn't even mention if anyone surveyed brought up aliens.

Within weeks, reports of flying saucer sightings became a daily occurrence with one particularly famous example being the Roswell incident in 1947 where remnants of a downed observation balloon were recovered by a farmer and confiscated by military personnel. UFO enthusiasts in the early 1950s started to organize local "saucer clubs" modeled after science fiction fan clubs of the 1930s and 1940s, with some growing to national and international prominence within a decade. In 1950, three influential books were published—Donald Keyhoe's The Flying Saucers Are Real, Frank Scully's Behind the Flying Saucers, and Gerald Heard's The Riddle of the Flying Saucers. Each guilelessly proposed that the extraterrestrial UFO hypothesis was the correct explanation and that the visits were in response to detonations of atomic weapons. These books also introduced Americans to, as Eghanian puts it, "the crusading whistleblower dedicated to breaking the silence over the alien origins of unidentified flying objects".

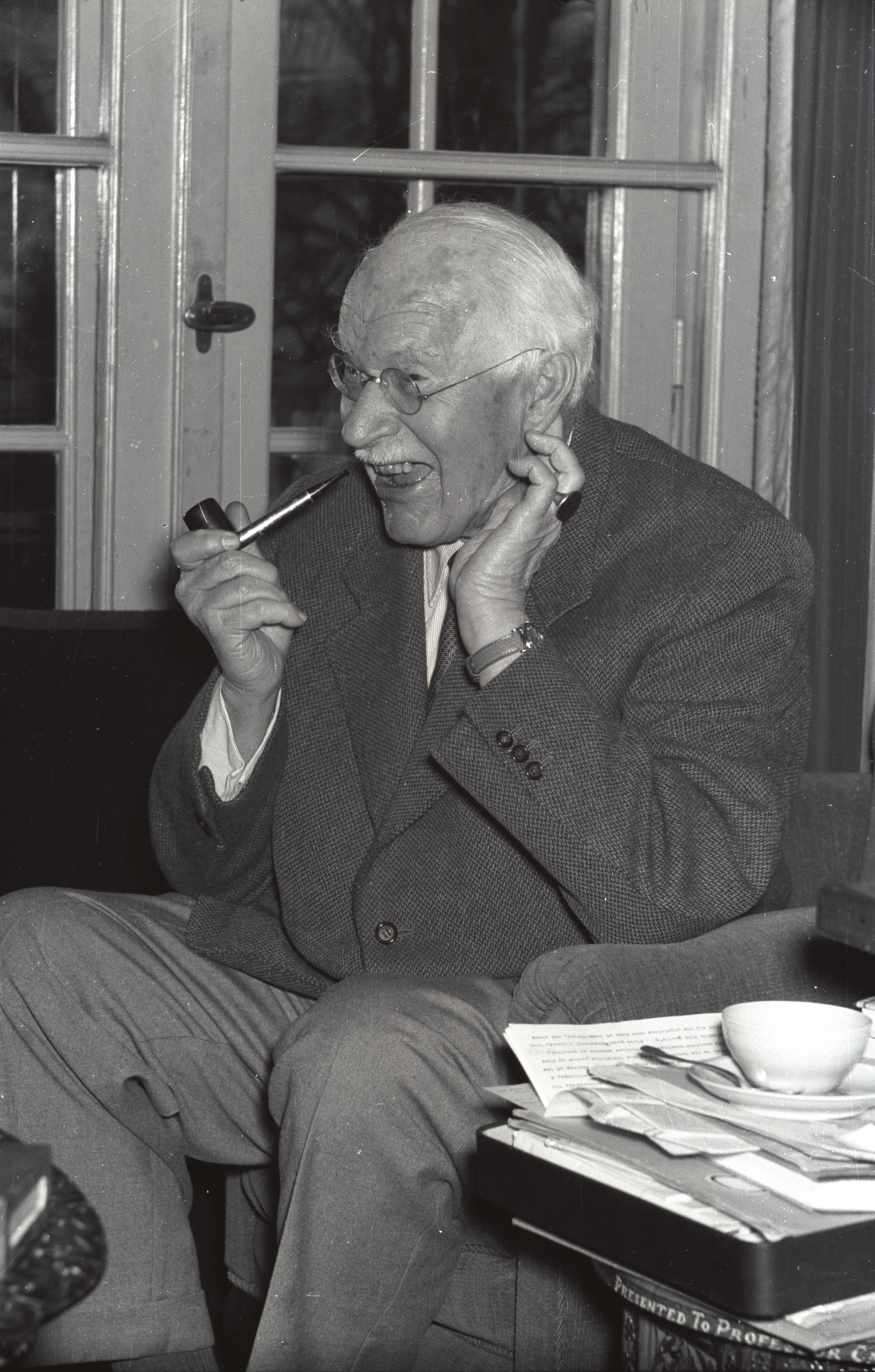
Jung in 1955

Media accounts and speculation ran rampant in the U.S., especially in connection to the 1952 UFO scare in Washington, D.C. so that, by 1953, the intelligence officials (Robertson Panel) worried that "genuine incursions" by enemy aircraft "over U.S. territory could be lost in a maelstrom of kooky hallucination" of UFO reports. A Trendex survey in August 1957, ten years after the Arnold incident, reported that over 25% of the U.S. public "believed unidentified flying objects could be from outer space". The cultural phenomenon showed up within some intellectual works such as the 1959 publication of Flying Saucers: A Modern Myth of Things Seen in the Sky by Carl Jung, a Swiss psychiatrist and psychoanalyst who founded analytical psychology.

Starting in 1947, the U.S. Air Force began to record and investigated UFO reports with Project Sign looking into "more than 250 cases" from 1947 to 1949. It was replaced by Project Grudge up through 1951. In the third U.S. Air Force program, from March 1952 to its termination in December 1969, "the U.S. Air Force cataloged 12,618 sightings of UFOs as part of what is now known as Project Blue Book". In the late 1950s, public pressure mounted for a full declassification of all UFO records, but the CIA played a role in refusing to allow this. This sense was not universal in the CIA, however, as fellow NICAP official Donald E. Keyhoe wrote that Vice Admiral Roscoe Hillenkoetter, the first director of the CIA, "wanted public disclosure of UFO evidence". Official U.S. Air Force interest in UFO reports went on hiatus in 1969 after a study by the University of Colorado led by Edward U. Condon and known as the Condon Report concluded "that nothing has come from the study of UFOs in the past 21 years that has added to scientific knowledge" and that further time investigating UFO reports "cannot be justified".

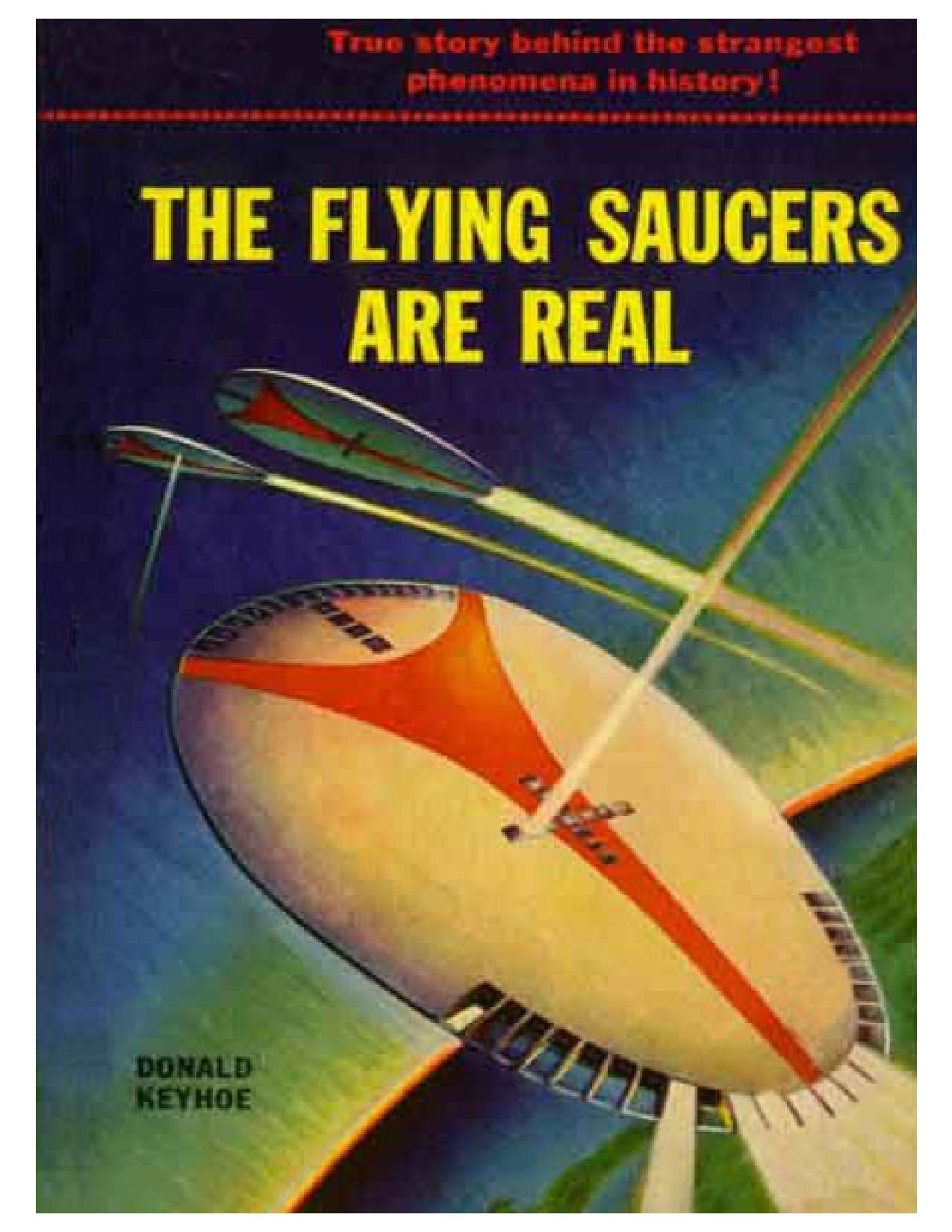
Cover of the 1953 book The Flying Saucers Are Real by Donald Keyhoe

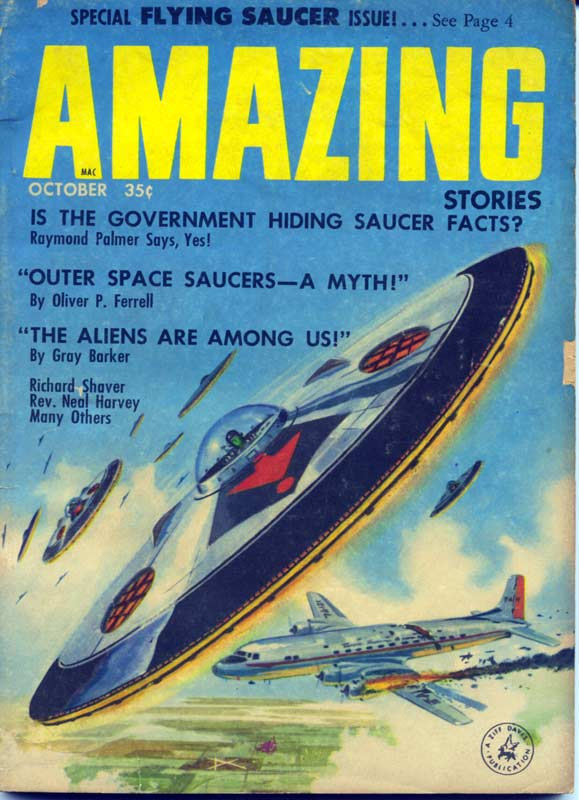
Cover of the pulp science fiction magazine Amazing Stories from October 1957

From the 1960s to 1990s, UFOs were part of American popular culture's obsession with the supernatural and paranormal. In 1961, the first alien abduction account was sensationalized when Barney and Betty Hill underwent hypnosis after seeing a UFO and reported recovered memories of their experience that became ever more elaborate as the years went by. In 1966, 5% of Americans reported to Gallup that "they had at some time seen something they thought was a 'flying saucer'", 96% said "they had heard or read about flying saucers", and 46% of these "thought they were 'something real' rather than just people's imagination". Responding to UFO enthusiasm, there have always been consistent yet less popular efforts made at debunking many of the claims, and at times the media was enlisted including a 1966 TV special, "UFO: Friend, Foe or Fantasy?", in which Walter Cronkite "patiently" explained to viewers that UFOs were fantasy. Cronkite enlisted Carl Sagan and J. Allen Hynek, who told Cronkite, "To this time, there is no valid scientific proof that we have been visited by spaceships".

Such attempts to disenchant the zeitgeist were not very successful at tamping down the mania. Keith Kloor notes that the "allure of flying saucers" remained popular with the public into the 1970s, spurring production of such sci-fi films, as Close Encounters of the Third Kind and Alien, which "continued to stoke public fascination". Meanwhile, Leonard Nimoy narrated a popular occult and mystery TV series In Search of... while daytime talk shows of Mike Douglas, Merv Griffin, and Phil Donahue featured interviews with alien abductees and people who credulously reported stories about UFOs . In the 1980s and 1990s, UFO stories featured in such pulp "true crime" serials as Unsolved Mysteries while the 33 Volume Time-Life series Mysteries of the Unknown which featured UFO stories sold some 700,000 copies. Kloor writes that by the late 1990s, "other big UFO subthemes had been prominently introduced into pop culture, such as the abduction phenomenon and government conspiracy narrative, via best-selling books and, of course, The X-Files".

Eghigian notes that, by this point, the UFO problem had become "far more interesting to ponder than to actually solve." Interest was particularly fevered in the 1990s with the publicity surrounding the television broadcast of an Alien autopsy video marketed as "real footage" but later admitted to be a staged "re-enactment". Eghigian writes that "there had always been outlier abduction reports dating back to the '50s and '60s" but that in the 1980s and 1990s "the floodgates opened, and with them a new generation of UFO advocates". Leaders among them were the artist Budd Hopkins, horror writer Whitley Strieber, historian David Jacobs, and Harvard psychiatrist John Mack. They all defended the "veracity of those claiming to have been kidnapped, examined, and experimented upon by beings from another world", writes Eghigian, as "new missionaries who simultaneously played the role of investigator, therapist, and advocate to their vulnerable charges". Eghigian says that Mack "signaled both the culmination and end of the headiest days of alien abduction". When Mack began working with and publishing accounts of abductees—or "experiencers", as he called them—in the early 1990s, he brought a sense of legitimacy to "the study of extraterrestrial captivity". By the late 1990s, however, the Harvard Medical School initiated a review of his position which allowed him to retain tenure. However, after this review, as the review board chairman Arnold Relman later put it, Mack was "not taken seriously by his colleagues anymore". Claims of alien abduction have continued, but no other clinicians would continue to speak of them as real in any sense. Nonetheless, these ideas persisted in popular opinion. According to a 1996 poll by Newsweek, 20% of Americans believed that UFOs were more likely to be proof of alien life than to have a natural scientific explanation.

=== 21st century ===
In December 2017, a new round of media attention started when the New York Times broke the story of the secret Advanced Aviation Threat Identification Program that was funded from 2007 to 2012 with $22 million spent on the program. Following this story, along with a series of sensationalized Pentagon UFO videos leaked by members of the program who became convinced that UFOs were genuine mysteries worth investigating, there was an increase in mainstream attention to UFO stories. In July 2021, Harvard astronomer Avi Loeb announced the creation of his Galileo Project which intended to use high-tech astronomical equipment to seek evidence of extraterrestrial artifacts in space and possibly within Earth's atmosphere. This was followed closely by the publication of Loeb's book Extraterrestrial, in which he argued that the first interstellar comet ever observed, ʻOumuamua, might be an artificial light sail made by an alien civilization. Two government sponsored programs, NASA's UAP independent study team and the All-domain Anomaly Resolution Office were charged in part by Congressional fiat to investigate UFO claims more fully, adopting the new moniker "unexplained aerial phenomenon" (UAP) to avoid associations with past sensationalism. On 17 May 2022, members of the United States House Intelligence Subcommittee on Counterterrorism, Counterintelligence and Counterproliferation held congressional hearings with top military officials to discuss military reports of UAPs. It was the first public congressional hearing into UFO sightings in the US in over 50 years. Another Congressional hearing took place on July 26, 2023, featuring the whistleblower claims of former U.S. Air Force (USAF) officer and intelligence official David Grusch.

A Harris Poll in 2009 found that 32% of Americans "believe in UFOs". A National Geographic study in June 2012 found that 36% of Americans believe UFOs exist and that 10% thought that they had spotted one. In June 2021 a Pew research poll found that 51% in the United States thought that UFOs reported by people in the military were likely to be evidence of intelligent life from beyond the Earth. In August 2021, Gallup, with a question not specific to military reports, only found that 41% of adults believed some UFOs involve alien spacecraft from other planets. This Gallup poll showed 44% of men and 38% of women believed this. This average of 41% in 2021 was up from 33% in a 2019 Gallup poll with the same question. Gallup further found that college graduates went in 2019 from being the least likely educational group to believe this to being on par in 2021 with adults who have no college education. An October 2022 poll by YouGov only found that 34% of Americans believe that UFOs are likely to involve alien life forms.

Historian Greg Eghigian wrote in August 2021 that "over the last fifty years, the mutual antagonism between paranormal believers and skeptics has largely framed discussion about unidentified flying objects" and that "it often gets personal". According to Eghigian, "Those taking seriously the prospect that UFOs are extraterrestrial in origin have dismissed doubters as narrow-minded, biased, obstinate, and cruel. Those dubious about the idea of visitors from other worlds have brushed off devotees as naïve, ignorant, gullible, and downright dangerous". Such "mudslinging over convictions is certainly familiar to historians of religion, a domain of human existence marked by deep divisions over interpretations of belief", and science too has found itself engaged increasing amounts of "boundary work" (which is "asserting and reasserting the borders between legitimate and illegitimate scientific research and ideas, between what may and what may not refer to itself as science") with regard to UFO questions. Eghigian points out our current "stark divide did not happen overnight, and its roots lie in the postwar decades, in a series of events that—with their news coverage, grainy images, celebrity crusaders, exasperated skeptics, unsatisfying military statements, and accusations of a government cover-up—foreshadow our present moment".

UFOs have been taken up by religious studies scholars in various scholarly books. Jeffrey Kripal, chair of the Department of Religion at Rice University, has said that "both the material and the mental dimensions [of UFOs] are incredibly important to get a sense of the full picture". As Adrian Horton writes "from The X-Files to Men in Black, Close Encounters of the Third Kind to Star Wars to Marvel, Hollywood has for decades provided an engrossing feedback loop for interest in the extraterrestrial: a reflection of our fears and capaciousness, whose ubiquitous popularity has in turn fueled more interest in UFOs as perennially compelling entertainment tropes not to be taken seriously". Horton observes that these "alien movies have generally reflected shifting cultural anxieties, from the existential terror of nuclear war to foreign enslavement to loss of bodily control". American entertainment has explored both "hostile aliens" as well as the "benevolent, world-expanding encounters" seen in films such as Steven Spielberg's Close Encounters of the Third Kind and E.T. the Extra-Terrestrial. In her research on the relationship of media to UFO beliefs, Diana Walsh Pasulka, a professor of philosophy and religion at the University of North Carolina, says that what is seen on a screen, "if it conforms to certain criteria, is interpreted as real, even if it is not real and even if one knows it is not real" and that "screen images embed themselves in one's brain and memories" in ways that "can determine how one views one's past and even determine one's future behaviors".

== Investigations of reports ==
UFOs have been subject to investigations over the years that varied widely in scope and scientific rigor. Governments or independent academics in the United States, Canada, the United Kingdom, Japan, Peru, France, Belgium, Sweden, Brazil, Chile, Uruguay, Mexico, Spain, and the Soviet Union are known to have investigated UFO reports at various times. No official government investigation has ever publicly concluded that UFOs are indisputably real, physical objects, extraterrestrial in origin, or of concern to national defense.

Among the best known government studies are the ghost rockets investigation by the Swedish military (1946–1947), Project Blue Book, previously Project Sign and Project Grudge, conducted by the USAF from 1947 until 1969, the secret U.S. Army/Air Force Project Twinkle investigation into green fireballs (1948–1951), the secret USAF Project Blue Book Special Report No. 14 by the Battelle Memorial Institute, and the Brazilian Air Force's 1977 Operação Prato (Operation Saucer). France has had an ongoing investigation (GEPAN/SEPRA/GEIPAN) within its space agency Centre national d'études spatiales (CNES) since 1977; the government of Uruguay has had a similar investigation since 1989.

=== Americas ===
==== Brazil (1952–2016) ====
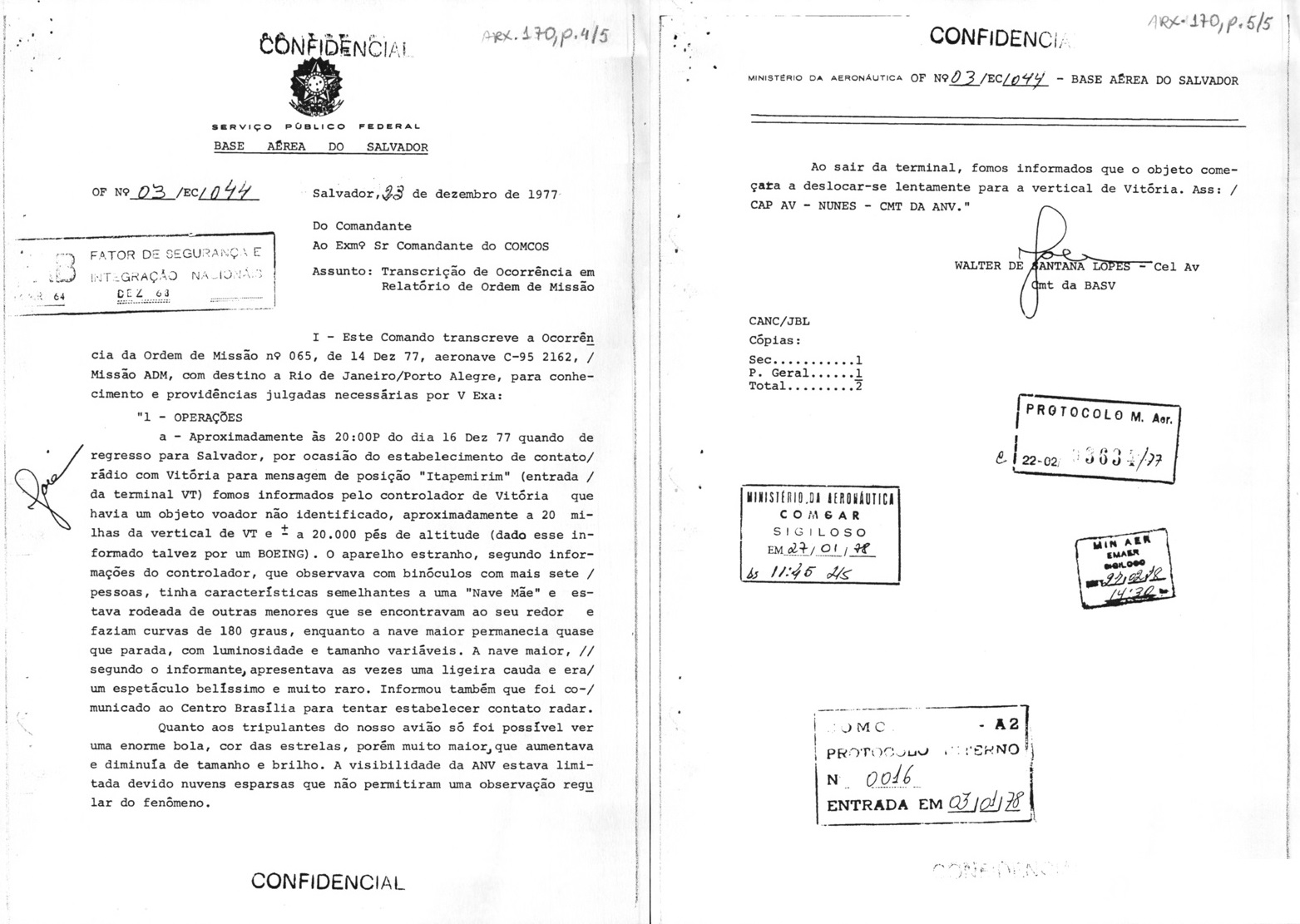
A document about a sighting of a UFO that occurred on December 16, 1977, in the state of Bahia, Brazil

On October 31, 2008, the National Archives of Brazil began receiving from the Aeronautical Documentation and History Center part of the documentation of the Brazilian Air Force regarding the investigation of the appearance of UFOs in Brazil. Currently, this collection gathers cases between 1952 and 2016.

==== Chile (c. 1968) ====
In Chile in 1968, the SEFAA (previously CEFAA) began receiving case reports of the general public, civil aviators and the Chilean Air Force regarding the sightings or the appearance of UFOs (Spanish: ovnis). The initial work was an initiative of Sergio Bravo Flores who led the Chilean Committee for the Study of Unidentified Space Phenomena, supported even by the Chilean Scientific Society. Currently, the organization changed its denomination to SEFAA and its a department of the DGAC(Chile) which in turn depends on the Chilean Air Force.

==== Canada (c. 1950) ====
In Canada, the Department of National Defence has dealt with reports, sightings and investigations of UFOs across Canada. In addition to conducting investigations into crop circles in Duhamel, Alberta, it still considers "unsolved" the Falcon Lake incident in Manitoba and the Shag Harbour UFO incident in Nova Scotia. Early Canadian studies included Project Magnet (1950–1954) and Project Second Storey (1952–1954), supported by the Defence Research Board.

==== United States ====
U.S. investigations into UFOs include:

- Project Sign, by the Air Materiel Command (AMC) USAF at Wright Field, precursor to Project Grudge, 1948.
- Ghost rockets investigations by the Finnish, Swedish and British militaries, later the US and Greece and Scandinavian wave, 1946–1947.
- Project Grudge, the successor to Project Sign, USAF from February 1949, succeeded by Project Blue Book, from March 1952.
- Project Twinkle investigation into green fireballs, by the U.S. Army/Air Force, briefly, from December 1949.
- The CIA's Directorate of Science & Technology (DS&T) review of UFO reports that led to the Robertson Panel, 1952–1953.
- The Report on Unidentified Flying Objects, by Edward Ruppelt, USAF Cpt (rtd.), later director of Project Blue Book, 1956.
- The Project Blue Book Special Report No. 14 statistical study by the Battelle Memorial Institute for USAF, 1951–1954
- The Aerial Phenomena Research Organization (APRO), a private research group, 1952–1988.
- The Robertson Panel was a CIA-convened scientific committee chaired by Howard P. Robertson, which met in January 1953 to review the Project Blue Book report.
- The Brookings Report, Proposed Studies on the Implications of Peaceful Space Activities for Human Affairs, in conjunction with NASA's Committee on Long-Range Studies, reported to Congress 1960
- The Condon Committee, a University of Colorado UFO project headed by Edward U. Condon for the USAF, begun in 1966 and completed in 1968.
- The RAND Corporation study, a private and internal study, 1968.
- The Mutual UFO Network (MUFON), a U.S.-based non-profit volunteer private UFO organization to study sightings, formed on May 31, 1969, later volunteered field investigators to support CUFOS.
- The National Investigations Committee On Aerial Phenomena (NICAP) is a UFO research group most active in the United States from the 1950s to the 1980 and remains as an informational depository on UFO phenomena.
- The Center for UFO Studies (CUFOS), a privately funded UFO research group, 1973 and continuing.
- The Sturrock panel, private investigation arising from the Society for Scientific Exploration, 1982.
- The Advanced Aerospace Threat Identification Program which was funded from 2007 to 2012.
- The Unidentified Aerial Phenomena Task Force (UAPTF), a program within the United States Office of Naval Intelligence which was acknowledged in 2017 and continued until 2021.
- The Airborne Object Identification and Management Synchronization Group (AOIMSG), an office within the Office of the Secretary of Defense to investigate unidentified objects from 2021-2022.
- The All-domain Anomaly Resolution Office (AARO), a current office within the Office of the Secretary of Defense created by Congress to investigate UFOs since 2022.

In addition to these, thousands of documents released under FOIA also indicate that many U.S. intelligence agencies collected (and still collect) information on UFOs. These agencies include the Defense Intelligence Agency (DIA), FBI, CIA, National Security Agency (NSA), as well as military intelligence agencies of the Army and U.S. Navy, in addition to the Air Force. (Note: Many of these documents are now online at the FOIA websites of these agencies such as the "FBI FOIA site". Archived from the original on May 24, 2008., as well as private websites such as The Black Vault, which has an archive of several thousand U.S. government UFO-related documents from the USAF, Army, CIA, DIA, DOD, and NSA.)

===== USAAF and FBI response to the 1947 sightings =====
Following the large U.S. surge in sightings in June and early July 1947, on July 9, 1947, United States Army Air Forces (USAAF) intelligence, in cooperation with the FBI, began a formal investigation into selected sightings with characteristics that could not be immediately rationalized, such as Kenneth Arnold's. The USAAF used "all of its top scientists" to determine whether "such a phenomenon could, in fact, occur". The research was "being conducted with the thought that the flying objects might be a celestial phenomenon," or that "they might be a foreign body mechanically devised and controlled." Three weeks later in a preliminary defense estimate, the air force investigation decided that, "This 'flying saucer' situation is not all imaginary or seeing too much in some natural phenomenon. Something is really flying around."

A further review by the intelligence and technical divisions of the Air Materiel Command at Wright Field reached the same conclusion. It reported that "the phenomenon is something real and not visionary or fictitious," and there were disc-shaped objects, metallic in appearance, as big as man-made aircraft. They were characterized by "extreme rates of climb [and] maneuverability", general lack of noise, absence of a trail, occasional formation flying, and "evasive" behavior "when sighted or contacted by friendly aircraft and radar", suggesting a controlled craft. It was therefore recommended in late September 1947 that an official Air Force investigation be set up. It was also recommended that other government agencies should assist in the investigation. (Note: The so-called Twining memo of September 23, 1947, by future USAF Chief of Staff, General Nathan Twining, specifically recommended intelligence cooperation with the Army, Navy, Atomic Energy Commission, the Defense Department's Joint Research and Development Board, Air Force Scientific Advisory Board, National Advisory Committee for Aeronautics (NACA), Project RAND, and the Nuclear Energy for the Propulsion of Aircraft (NEPA) project.)

===== Projects Sign (1947–1949), Grudge (1948–1951), and Blue Book (1951–1970) =====
Project Sign's final report, published in early 1949, stated that while some UFOs appeared to represent actual aircraft, there was not enough data to determine their origin. The Air Force's Project Sign was created at the end of 1947, and was one of the earliest government studies to come to a secret extraterrestrial conclusion. In August 1948, Sign investigators wrote a top-secret intelligence estimate to that effect, but the Air Force Chief of Staff Hoyt Vandenberg ordered it destroyed. The existence of this suppressed report was revealed by several insiders who had read it, such as astronomer and USAF consultant J. Allen Hynek and Capt. Edward J. Ruppelt, the first head of the USAF's Project Blue Book.

Another highly classified U.S. study was conducted by the CIA's Office of Scientific Investigation (OS/I) in the latter half of 1952 in response to orders from the National Security Council (NSC). This study concluded UFOs were real physical objects of potential threat to national security. One OS/I memo to the CIA Director (DCI) in December read that "the reports of incidents convince us that there is something going on that must have immediate attention ... Sightings of unexplained objects at great altitudes and traveling at high speeds in the vicinity of major U.S. defense installations are of such a nature that they are not attributable to natural phenomena or any known types of aerial vehicles."

The matter was considered so urgent that OS/I drafted a memorandum from the DCI to the NSC proposing that the NSC establish an investigation of UFOs as a priority project throughout the intelligence and the defense research and development community. It also urged the DCI to establish an external research project of top-level scientists, now known as the Robertson Panel to analyze the problem of UFOs. The OS/I investigation was called off after the Robertson Panel's negative conclusions in January 1953.

Project Sign was dismantled and became Project Grudge at the end of 1948. Angered by the low quality of investigations by Grudge, the Air Force Director of Intelligence reorganized it as Project Blue Book in late 1951, placing Ruppelt in charge. J. Allen Hynek, a trained astronomer who served as a scientific advisor for Project Blue Book, was initially skeptical of UFO reports, but eventually came to the conclusion that many of them could not be satisfactorily explained and was highly critical of what he described as "the cavalier disregard by Project Blue Book of the principles of scientific investigation". Leaving government work, he founded the privately funded the Center for UFO Studies (CUFOS), to whose work he devoted the rest of his life. Other private groups studying the phenomenon include the MUFON, a grassroots organization whose investigator's handbooks go into great detail on the documentation of alleged UFO sightings. MUFON later volunteered field investigators to support work of Hynek and CUFOS.

===== USAF Regulation 200-2 (1953–1954) =====
Air Force Regulation 200-2, issued in 1953 and 1954, defined an Unidentified Flying Object ("UFOB") as "any airborne object which by performance, aerodynamic characteristics, or unusual features, does not conform to any presently known aircraft or missile type, or which cannot be positively identified as a familiar object." The regulation also said UFOBs were to be investigated as a "possible threat to the security of the United States" and "to determine technical aspects involved." The regulation went on to say that "it is permissible to inform news media representatives on UFOB's when the object is positively identified as a familiar object" but added: "For those objects which are not explainable, only the fact that ATIC [Air Technical Intelligence Center] will analyze the data is worthy of release, due to many unknowns involved."

===== Blue Book and the Condon Committee (1968–1970) =====
A public research effort conducted by the Condon Committee for the USAF and published as the Condon Report arrived at a negative conclusion in 1968. Blue Book closed down in 1970, using the Condon Committee's negative conclusion as a rationale, thus ending official Air Force UFO investigations. However, a 1969 USAF document, known as the Bolender memo, along with later government documents, revealed that non-public U.S. government UFO investigations continued after 1970. The Bolender memo first stated that "reports of unidentified flying objects that could affect national security ... are not part of the Blue Book system", indicating that more serious UFO incidents already were handled outside the public Blue Book investigation. The memo then added, "reports of UFOs which could affect national security would continue to be handled through the standard Air Force procedures designed for this purpose." (Note: For example, current USAF general reporting procedures are in Air Force Instruction (AFI)10-206. Section 5.7.3 (p. 64) lists sightings of "unidentified flying objects" and "aircraft of unconventional design" as separate categories from potentially hostile but conventional, unidentified aircraft, missiles, surface vessels, or submarines. Additionally, "unidentified objects" detected by missile warning systems, creating a potential risk of nuclear war, are covered by Rule 5E (p.35).)

In the late 1960s, a chapter on UFOs in the Space Sciences course at the U.S. Air Force Academy gave serious consideration to possible extraterrestrial origins. When word of the curriculum became public, in 1970, the Air Force issued a statement to the effect that the book was outdated and cadets instead were being informed of the Condon Report's negative conclusion. Controversy surrounded the report, both before and after its release. It has been observed that the report was "harshly criticized by numerous scientists, particularly at the powerful AIAA ... [which] recommended moderate, but continuous scientific work on UFOs." In an address to the AAAS, James E. McDonald said he believed science had failed to mount adequate studies of the problem and criticized the Condon Report and earlier studies by the USAF as scientifically deficient. He also questioned the basis for Condon's conclusions and argued that the reports of UFOs have been "laughed out of scientific court". J. Allen Hynek, an astronomer who worked as a USAF consultant from 1948, sharply criticized the Condon Committee Report and later wrote two nontechnical books that set forth the case for continuing to investigate UFO reports. Ruppelt recounted his experiences with Project Blue Book, a USAF investigation that preceded Condon's.

===== FOIA release of documents in 1978 =====
According to a 1979 New York Times report, "records from the C.I.A., the F.B.I. and other Federal agencies" ("about 900 documents—nearly 900 pages of memos, reports and correspondence") obtained in 1978 through the Freedom of Information Act request, indicate that "despite official pronouncements for decades that U.F.O.'s were nothing more than misidentified aerial objects and as such were no cause for alarm ... the phenomenon has aroused much serious behind‐the‐scenes concern" in the US government. In particular, officials were concerned over the "approximately 10%" of UFO sightings which remained unexplained, and whether they might be Soviet aircraft and a threat to national security. Officials were concerned about the "risk of false alerts", of "falsely identifying the real as phantom", and of mass hysteria caused by sightings. In 1947, Brigadier General George F. Schulgen of Army Air Corps Intelligence, warned "the first reported sightings might have been by individuals of Communist sympathies with the view to causing hysteria and fear of a secret Russian weapon."

===== White House statement of November 2011 =====
In November 2011, the White House released an official response to two petitions asking the U.S. government to acknowledge formally that aliens have visited this planet and to disclose any intentional withholding of government interactions with extraterrestrial beings. According to the response:

The U.S. government has no evidence that any life exists outside our planet, or that an extraterrestrial presence has contacted or engaged any member of the human race...no credible information to suggest that any evidence is being hidden from the public's eye....

— Statement by the White House

The response further noted that efforts, like SETI and NASA's Kepler space telescope and Mars Science Laboratory, continue looking for signs of life. The response noted "odds are pretty high" that there may be life on other planets but "the odds of us making contact with any of them—especially any intelligent ones—are extremely small, given the distances involved."

===== ODNI report 2021 =====
On June 25, 2021, the Office of the Director of National Intelligence released a report on UAPs. The report found that the UAPTF was unable to identify 143 objects spotted between 2004 and 2021. The report said that 18 of these featured unusual movement patterns or flight characteristics, adding that more analysis was needed to determine if those sightings represented "breakthrough" technology. The report said that "some of these steps are resource-intensive and would require additional investment." The report did not link the sightings to extraterrestrial life.

===== Ongoing investigations =====
Amid ongoing drone and UFO incursions over US military installations, Congress directed continued reporting in the National Defense Authorization Act for Fiscal Year 2026, including retroactive and ongoing disclosure of UFO intercepts by NORAD and NORTHCOM.

==== Uruguay (c. 1989) ====
The Uruguayan Air Force has conducted UFO investigations since 1989 and reportedly analyzed 2,100 cases of which they regard approximately 2% as lacking explanation.

=== Europe ===
==== Finland (1967–1971) ====
Many people reported UFO sightings in and around the Pudasjärvi area in the North Ostrobothnia region in the late 1960s and early 1970s. UFO researchers and the press only became interested in UFOs in the area after a sighting in September 1969, after which UFO researchers from other parts of Finland and Sweden visited the area. An earthquake light has been proposed as an explanation for the Pudasjärvi phenomena.

==== France (1977–2008) ====
In March 2007, the French space agency CNES published an archive of UFO sightings and other phenomena online. French studies include GEPAN/SEPRA/GEIPAN within CNES (French space agency), the longest ongoing government-sponsored investigation. About 22% of the 6,000 cases studied remain unexplained. The official opinion of GEPAN/SEPRA/GEIPAN has been neutral, stating on their FAQ page that their mission is fact-finding for the scientific community, not rendering an opinion. They add they can neither prove nor disprove the Extraterrestrial Hypothesis (ETH), but their Steering Committee's clear position is that they cannot discard the possibility that some fraction of the very strange 22% of unexplained cases might be due to distant and advanced civilizations.

Possibly their bias may be indicated by their use of the terms "PAN" (French) or "UAP" (English equivalent) for "Unidentified Aerospace Phenomenon" (whereas "UAP" is normally used by English organizations stands for "Unidentified Aerial Phenomenon", a more neutral term). In addition, the three heads of the studies have gone on record in stating that UFOs were real physical flying machines beyond our knowledge or that the best explanation for the most inexplicable cases was an extraterrestrial one. In 2007, the CNES's own report stated that, at that time, 28% of sightings remained unidentified.

In 2008, Michel Scheller, president of the Association Aéronautique et Astronautique de France (3AF), created the Sigma Commission. Its purpose was to investigate UFO phenomena worldwide. A progress report published in May 2010 stated that the central hypothesis proposed by the COMETA report is perfectly credible. In December 2012, the final report of the Sigma Commission was submitted to Scheller. Following the submission of the final report, the Sigma2 Commission is to be formed with a mandate to continue the scientific investigation of UFO phenomena.

==== Italy (1933–2005) ====
Alleged UFO sightings gradually increased since the war, peaking in 1978 and 2005. The total number of sightings since 1947 are 18,500, of which 90% are identifiable.

==== United Kingdom (1951–2009) ====
The UK's Flying Saucer Working Party published its final report in June 1951, which remained secret for over fifty years. The Working Party concluded that all UFO sightings could be explained as misidentifications of ordinary objects or phenomena, optical illusions, psychological misperceptions/aberrations, or hoaxes. The report stated: "We accordingly recommend very strongly that no further investigation of reported mysterious aerial phenomena be undertaken, unless and until some material evidence becomes available."

Eight file collections on UFO sightings, dating from 1978 to 1987, were first released on May 14, 2008, to The National Archives by the Ministry of Defence (MoD). Although kept secret from the public for many years, most of the files have low levels of classification and none are classified Top Secret. 200 files are set to be made public by 2012. The files are correspondence from the public sent to the British government and officials, such as the MoD and Margaret Thatcher. The MoD released the files under the Freedom of Information Act due to requests from researchers. These files include, but are not limited to, UFOs over Liverpool and Waterloo Bridge in London. On October 20, 2008, more UFO files were released. One case released detailed that in 1991 an Alitalia passenger aircraft was approaching London Heathrow Airport when the pilots saw what they described as a "cruise missile" fly extremely close to the cockpit. The pilots believed a collision was imminent. UFO expert David Clarke says this is one of the most convincing cases for a UFO he has come across.

A secret study of UFOs was undertaken for the Ministry of Defence between 1996 and 2000 and was code-named Project Condign. The resulting report, titled "Unidentified Aerial Phenomena in the UK Defence Region", was publicly released in 2006, but the identity and credentials of whoever constituted Project Condign remains classified. The report confirmed earlier findings that the main causes of UFO sightings are misidentification of man-made and natural objects. The report noted: "No artefacts of unknown or unexplained origin have been reported or handed to the UK authorities, despite thousands of Unidentified Aerial Phenomena reports. There are no SIGINT, ELINT or radiation measurements and little useful video or still IMINT." It concluded: "There is no evidence that any UAP, seen in the UKADR [UK Air Defence Region], are incursions by air-objects of any intelligent (extraterrestrial or foreign) origin, or that they represent any hostile intent." A little-discussed conclusion of the report was that novel meteorological plasma phenomenon akin to ball lightning are responsible for "the majority, if not all" of otherwise inexplicable sightings, especially reports of black triangle UFOs.

On December 1, 2009, the Ministry of Defence quietly closed down its UFO investigations unit. The unit's hotline and email address were suspended by the MoD on that date. The MoD said there was no value in continuing to receive and investigate sightings in a release, stating that "in over fifty years, no UFO report has revealed any evidence of a potential threat to the United Kingdom. The MoD has no specific capability for identifying the nature of such sightings. There is no Defence benefit in such investigation and it would be an inappropriate use of defence resources. Furthermore, responding to reported UFO sightings diverts MoD resources from tasks that are relevant to Defence." The Guardian reported that the MoD claimed the closure would save the Ministry around £50,000 a year. The MoD said it would continue to release UFO files to the public through The National Archives. UFO reports, Parliamentary questions, and letters from members of the public were released on August 5, 2010, to the UK National Archives. "In one letter included in the files, a man alleges Churchill ordered a coverup of a WWII-era UFO encounter involving the Royal Air Force". Reports of UFO sightings continue. According to The Independent, there were 957 reported UFO sightings across the UK between January 2021 and May 2023, with Manchester, London, Liverpool, and Glasgow being hotspots.

== Studies ==
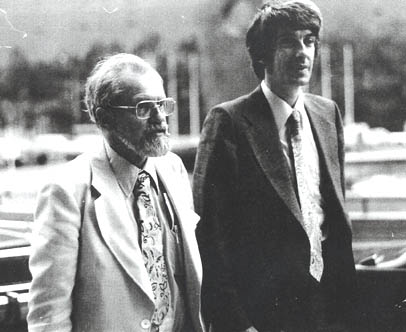
J. Allen Hynek (left) and Jacques Vallée

UFOs have become a prevalent theme in modern culture, and the social phenomena have been the subject of academic research in sociology and psychology. Critics argue that all UFO evidence is anecdotal, and can be explained as prosaic natural phenomena. Defenders of UFO research counter that knowledge of observational data, other than what is reported in the popular media, is limited in the scientific community and further study is needed. Studies have established that the majority of UFO observations are misidentified conventional objects or natural phenomena—most commonly aircraft, balloons including sky lanterns, satellites, and astronomical objects such as meteors, bright stars and planets. A small percentage are hoaxes. (Note: For example, the USAF's Project Blue Book concluded that less than 2% of reported UFOs were "psychological" or hoaxes; Allan Hendry's study for CUFOS had less than 1%.)

Fewer than 10% of reported sightings remain unexplained after proper investigation and therefore can be classified as unidentified in the strictest sense. Skeptic Steven Novella has pointed out that proponents of the extraterrestrial hypothesis (ETH) jump to conclusions when they suggest that these unexplained reports are alien spacecraft without fairly excluding the null hypothesis that more prosaic explanations, generally considered more plausible by Occam's razor, cannot be ruled out. Novella remonstrates UFO enthusiasts for engaging in special pleading by offering outlandish, untested stories to prop up their prior belief in extraterrestrial visitation when a more straightforward explanation is that the unexplained sightings remain unidentified due to a lack of information or due to the necessarily subjective nature of the stories.

=== Scientific ===
Historically, ufology has not been considered credible in mainstream science. The scientific community has generally deemed that UFO sightings are not worthy of serious investigation except as a cultural artifact. Studies of UFOs rarely appear in mainstream scientific literature. When asked, some scientists and scientific organizations have pointed to the end of official governmental studies in the U.S. in December 1969, following the statement by the government scientist Edward Condon that further study of UFOs could not be justified on grounds of scientific advancement. On 14 September 2023, NASA reported the appointment, for the first time, of a NASA Director of UAP Research (known earlier as U.F.O.), identified as Mark McInerney, to scientifically, and transparently, study such occurrences.

==== Status as a pseudoscience ====
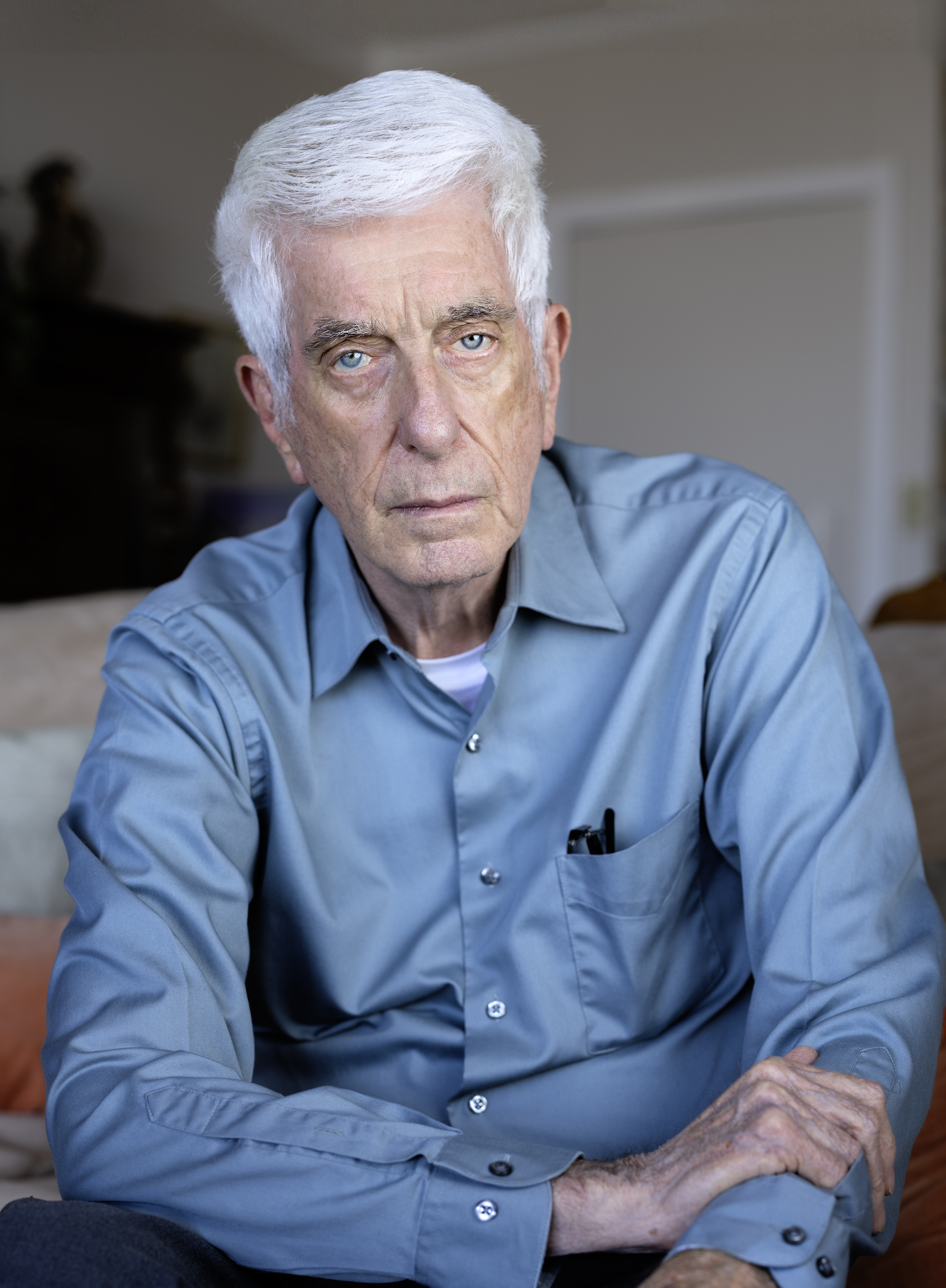
Jacques Vallée

Despite investigations sponsored by governments and private entities, ufology is not embraced by academia as a scientific field of study, and is instead generally considered a pseudoscience by skeptics and science educators, being often included on lists of topics characterized as pseudoscience as either a partial or total pseudoscience. Pseudoscience is a term that classifies arguments that are claimed to exemplify the methods and principles of science, but do not adhere to an appropriate scientific method, lack supporting evidence, plausibility, falsifiability, or otherwise lack scientific status.

Some writers have identified social factors that contribute to the status of ufology as a pseudoscience, with one study suggesting that "any science doubt surrounding unidentified flying objects and aliens was not primarily due to the ignorance of ufologists about science, but rather a product of the respective research practices of and relations between ufology, the sciences, and government investigative bodies". One study suggests that "the rudimentary standard of science communication attending to the extraterrestrial intelligence (ETI) hypothesis for UFOs inhibits public understanding of science, dissuades academic inquiry within the physical and social sciences, and undermines progressive space policy initiatives".

Jacques Vallée, a scientist and ufologist, claimed there were deficiencies in most UFO research, including government studies. He criticized the mythology and cultism often associated with UFO sightings, but despite the challenges, Vallée contended that several hundred professional scientists—a group both he and Hynek termed "the invisible college"—continued to study UFOs quietly on their own time.

==== Studies ====
In 2021, astronomer Avi Loeb launched The Galileo Project, which intends to collect and report scientific evidence of extraterrestrials or extraterrestrial technology on or near Earth via telescopic observations. In Germany, the University of Würzburg is developing intelligent sensors that can help detect and analyze aerial objects in hopes of applying such technology to UAP. A 2021 Gallup poll found that belief among Americans in some UFOs being extraterrestrial spacecraft grew between 2019 and 2021 from 33% to 41%. Gallup cited increased coverage in mainstream news and scrutiny from government authorities as a factor in changing attitudes towards UFOs.

In 2022, NASA announced a nine-month study starting in the fall to help establish a road map for investigating UAP—or for reconnaissance of the publicly available data it might use for such research. In 2023, the RAND Corporation published a study reviewing 101,151 public reports of UAP sightings in the United States from 1998 to 2022. The models used to conduct the analysis showed that reports of UAP sightings were less likely within 30 km of weather stations, 60 km of civilian airports, and in more–densely populated areas, while rural areas tended to have a higher rate of UAP reports. The most consistent and statistically significant finding was that reports of UAP sightings were more likely to occur within 30 km of military operations areas, where routine military training occurs.

==== Sturrock panel categorization ====
Besides anecdotal visual sightings, reports sometimes include claims of other kinds of evidence, including cases studied by the military and various government agencies of different countries (such as Project Blue Book, the Condon Committee, the French GEPAN/SEPRA, and Uruguay's current Air Force study). A comprehensive scientific review of cases where physical evidence was available was carried out by the 1998 Sturrock panel, with specific examples of many of the categories listed below.

- Radar contact and tracking, sometimes from multiple sites. These have included military personnel and control tower operators, simultaneous visual sightings, and aircraft intercepts. One such example was the mass sightings of large, silent, low-flying black triangles in 1989 and 1990 over Belgium, tracked by NATO radar and jet interceptors, and investigated by Belgium's military (included photographic evidence). Another famous case from 1986 was the Japan Air Lines flight 1628 incident over Alaska investigated by the Federal Aviation Administration (FAA).
- Photographic evidence, including still photos, movie film, and video.
- Claims of physical trace of landing UFOs, including ground impressions, burned or desiccated soil, burned and broken foliage, magnetic anomalies, increased radiation levels, and metallic traces (e. g. Height 611 UFO incident or the 1964 Lonnie Zamora's Socorro, New Mexico encounter of the USAF Project Blue Book cases). A well-known example from December 1980 was the USAF Rendlesham Forest incident in England. Another occurred in January 1981 in Trans-en-Provence and was investigated by GEPAN, then France's official government UFO-investigation agency. Project Blue Book head Edward J. Ruppelt described a classic 1952 CE2 case involving a patch of charred grass roots.
- Physiological effects on people and animals including temporary paralysis, skin burns and rashes, corneal burns, and symptoms superficially resembling radiation poisoning, such as the Cash-Landrum incident in 1980.
- Animal/cattle mutilation cases, which some feel are also part of the UFO phenomenon.
- Biological effects on plants such as increased or decreased growth, germination effects on seeds, and blown-out stem nodes (usually associated with physical trace cases or crop circles)
- Electromagnetic interference (EM) effects. A famous 1976 military case over Tehran, recorded in CIA and DIA classified documents, was associated with communication losses in multiple aircraft and weapons system failure in an F-4 Phantom II jet interceptor as it was about to fire a missile on one of the UFOs.
- Apparent remote radiation detection, some noted in FBI and CIA documents occurring over government nuclear installations at Los Alamos National Laboratory and Oak Ridge National Laboratory in 1950, also reported by Project Blue Book director Edward J. Ruppelt in his book.
- Claimed artifacts of UFOs themselves, such as 1957, Ubatuba, Brazil, magnesium fragments analyzed by the Brazilian government and in the Condon Report and by others. The 1964 Lonnie Zamora incident also left metal traces, analyzed by NASA. A more recent example involves a teardrop-shaped object recovered by Bob White and was featured in a television episode of UFO Hunters but was later found to be accumulated waste metal residue from a grinding machine.
- Angel hair and angel grass, possibly explained in some cases as nests from ballooning spiders or chaff.

==== Scientific skepticism ====
A scientifically skeptical group that has for many years offered critical analyses of UFO claims is the Committee for Skeptical Inquiry (CSI). One example is the response to local beliefs that "extraterrestrial beings" in UFOs were responsible for crop circles appearing in Indonesia, which the government and the National Institute of Aeronautics and Space (LAPAN) described as "man-made". Thomas Djamaluddin, research professor of astronomy and astrophysics at LAPAN stated: "We have come to agree that this 'thing' cannot be scientifically proven. Scientists have put UFOs in the category of pseudoscience."

=== Governmental ===
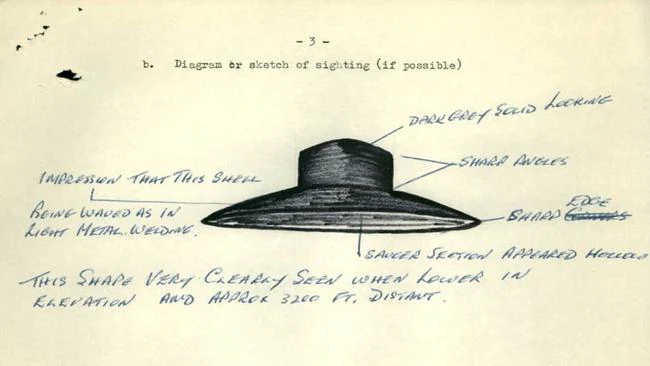
UFO drawing, authenticity unknown, attribution and date unspecified. One of hundreds of files resulting from US President Bill Clinton's 1995 order to the CIA to declassify all documents with "historical value" that were at least 25 years old.

UFOs have been the subject of investigations by various governments that have provided extensive records related to the subject. Many of the most involved government-sponsored investigations ended after agencies concluded that there was no benefit to continued investigation. These same negative conclusions also have been found in studies that were highly classified for many years, such as the UK's Flying Saucer Working Party, Project Condign, the U.S. CIA-sponsored Robertson Panel, the U.S. military investigation into the green fireballs from 1948 to 1951, and the Battelle Memorial Institute study for the USAF from 1952 to 1955 (Project Blue Book Special Report No. 14). Some public government reports have acknowledged the possibility of the physical reality of UFOs, but have stopped short of proposing extraterrestrial origins, though not dismissing the possibility entirely. Examples are the Belgian military investigation into large triangles over their airspace in 1989–1991 and the 2009 Uruguayan Air Force study conclusion.

==== Claims by military, government, and aviation personnel ====
In the 21st century, UFO claims by military, government, and aviation figures have included both firsthand accounts and official statements about unidentified aerial phenomena. Later reporting and assessments by the Navy, the Pentagon, and U.S. intelligence agencies gave the issue greater public and institutional visibility.

===== 2000-2019 =====
In a 2007 CNN commentary, former Arizona governor Fife Symington wrote that during the 1997 Phoenix Lights incident, he had seen "a massive, delta-shaped craft silently navigate over Piestewa Peak (formerly called Squaw Peak), a mountain range in Phoenix, Arizona". In The Way of the Explorer (2008), Apollo 14 astronaut Edgar Mitchell wrote that he had met "credible professionals within two governments" who had testified to firsthand "close encounters", and that this left him with no doubt that aliens had visited Earth.

In April 2019, a Navy spokesperson said the service had received "a number of reports" of unauthorized and/or unidentified aircraft entering military-controlled ranges in recent years and that it was "updating and formalizing" its reporting process. In May 2019, The New York Times reported that Navy pilots flying training missions off the eastern seaboard had repeatedly encountered unidentified objects between the summer of 2014 and March 2015. The Pentagon officially released these videos on April 27, 2020. A 2021 assessment by the Office of the Director of National Intelligence later said that no standardized reporting mechanism had existed until the Navy established one in March 2019, and that 80 of the 144 reports reviewed involved observation with multiple sensors.

The Times published a cockpit instrument video that appeared to show an object moving at high speed near the ocean surface as it appeared to rotate, and objects that appeared capable of high acceleration, deceleration and maneuverability. In two separate incidents, a pilot reported his cockpit instruments locked onto and tracked objects but he was unable to see them through his helmet camera. In another encounter, flight instruments recorded an image described as a sphere encasing a cube between two jets as they flew about 100 feet apart. The United States Navy has said there have been "a number of reports of unauthorized and/or unidentified aircraft entering various military-controlled ranges and designated air space in recent years".

According to former U.S. Navy Lieutenant Ryan Graves, UAPs spotted by US Navy crew aboard the USS Nimitz, the USS Princeton, and other carriers in 2014 prompted flight safety concerns by some Navy pilots. Graves, described as "one of the most vocal advocates for UAP transparency", said the appearance of UFOs was frequent near aircraft carriers. In 2019, a US Navy spokesperson, Joseph Gradisher stated, "For safety and security concerns, the Navy and the [US Air Force] takes these reports very seriously and investigates each and every report", and because of the sightings, the "Navy is updating and formalising the process" of reporting, with the reporting process updated by 2020.

===== 2020-present =====
In May 2021, military pilots recalled their related encounters, along with camera and radar support, including one pilot's account noting that such incidents occurred "every day for at least a couple of years", according to an interview broadcast on the news program, 60 Minutes (May 16, 2021). Science writer and skeptic Mick West noted that the image could be explained as being the result of an optical effect called a bokeh which can make out of focus light sources appear triangular or pyramidal due to the shape of the aperture of some lenses. In August, 2022, an article by West provided his detailed analysis of the video.

The 2021 Pentagon UFO Report

On June 25, 2021, U.S. Defense and intelligence officials released the nine pages Pentagon UFO Report (Preliminary Assessment: Unidentified Aerial Phenomena) on what they know about a series of unidentified flying objects that have been seen by American military pilots in the skies between 2004 and 2021. It observed that "UAP probably lack a single explanation", but identified airborne clutter and foreign adversary systems as among possible objects that "clearly pose a safety of flight issue and may pose a challenge to U.S. national security". The report also mentioned dangers associated with "an increasingly cluttered air domain". The issue of safety with commercial airlines has also been raised. The report does not mention extraterrestrials, but concludes that the objects found by the US military appear to be real in the majority of the 144 occurrences documented.

"Most of the UAP reported probably do represent physical objects given that a majority of UAP were registered across multiple sensors, to include radar, infrared, electro-optical, weapon seekers, and visual observation", according to the report. The report also stated that "UAP probably lack a single explanation", and proposed five possible categories of explanation: airborne clutter, natural atmospheric phenomena, US government or industry development technology, foreign craft, and an "Other" category. Commenting on the document, NASA Administrator Bill Nelson said that he did not think we are alone, but the UFO sightings by pilots "may not be extraterrestrial."

In December 2021, further official governmental investigations into UAPs and related, along with annual unclassified reports presented to Congress, have been authorized and funded. Some have raised concerns about the new investigations. U.S. President Joe Biden in 2023 signed the Unidentified Anomalous Phenomena Disclosure Act into law as part of the National Defense Authorization Act for Fiscal Year 2024 on December 14, 2023. The 64-page amendment defined and codified 22 technical definitions related to UFOs and non-human intelligence under the law.

==== Conspiracy theories ====
UFOs are a recurring subject of conspiracy theories in which governments are alleged to conceal evidence of alien visitors and, in some variants, to collaborate with them. These narratives have taken multiple forms and often overlap with other conspiracy traditions. Such views have been expressed by prominent officials, legislators, scholars, journalists, and military personnel. In June and July 2023, former intelligence official David Grusch claimed that the U.S. government had been running a "multi-decade" UAP crash-retrieval and reverse-engineering program and possessed craft of "non-human" origin. In media interviews, Grusch also claimed that the U.S. possessed a "bell-like craft" recovered by Benito Mussolini's government in northern Italy in 1933 at Magenta, Lombardy.

At a November 13, 2024, joint House Oversight Committee hearing on UAPs, Rep. Nancy Mace entered into the Congressional Record a 12-page document describing an alleged unacknowledged Special Access Program (USAP) named "Immaculate Constellation", where the U.S. government is claimed to operate extralegal programs to conceal information from Congress, including related to the existence of extraterrestrial life and technology. In April and May 2025, Jeremy Corbell and George Knapp released a multi-part WEAPONIZED interview series presenting Matthew Brown as the report's previously anonymous author, a characterization later noted by Jezebel.

==== Disclosure advocates ====
In May 2001, the Disclosure Project held a press conference at the National Press Club in Washington, D.C., featuring more than twenty witnesses, most of them former military personnel, as part of a campaign urging Congress to hold hearings on UFOs and extraterrestrials. ABC News reported the witnesses stated they had seen evidence of aliens or UFOs and called for congressional hearings, while Disclosure Project founder Steven M. Greer said some 400 witnesses were willing to testify before Congress. In 2002, the Oregon Daily Emerald reported that Greer had compiled more than 120 hours of testimony from government officials, later reduced to 18 hours, including accounts from Brigadier General Stephen Lovekin and astronaut Gordon Cooper.

By March 2007, Disclose.tv existed as a forum devoted to UFOs, paranormal topics, and conspiracy theories, and its name invoked the UFO-community idea of "disclosure".

On September 27, 2010, former U.S. Air Force personnel held a press conference at the National Press Club in Washington, D.C., where they alleged that UFOs had interfered with nuclear missiles at U.S. bases. From April 29 to May 3, 2013, the Paradigm Research Group held the Citizen Hearing on Disclosure at the National Press Club, paying six former members of Congress about $20,000 each, plus expenses, to hear roughly 30 hours of testimony from researchers and military, agency, and political witnesses.

=== Religious ===
Scholars of religion have identified a number of UFO religions, including the Aetherius Society, Heaven's Gate, Unarius, and the Raëlian Movement. Many forms of UFO religiosity have been traced by scholars to occult, spiritualist, and Theosophical currents. Within American evangelical and conservative evangelical ufology, UFOs have often been interpreted as demonic entities or spiritual deceptions masquerading as extraterrestrials. Scholars have linked these demonological readings to apocalyptic and Jeremiad traditions within Evangelicalism culture and the reuse of older Christian mythology and symbols in modern UFO belief.

=== Ufology ===
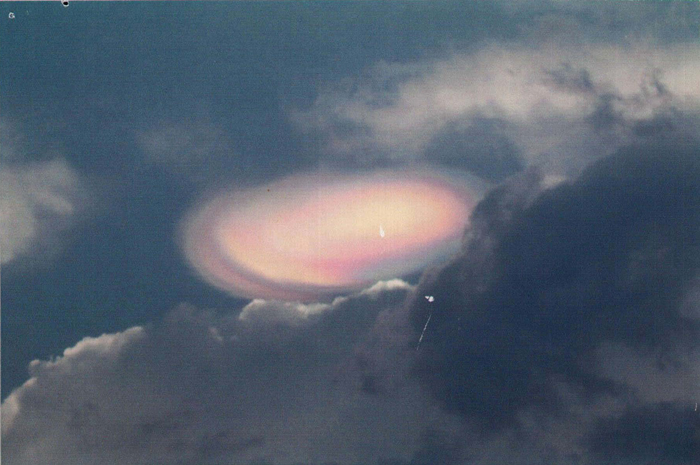
A photograph of an unusual atmospheric occurrence observed over Sri Lanka, forwarded to the UK Ministry of Defence by RAF Fylingdales, 2004

Ufology is a neologism describing the study of UFO reports and associated evidence. In a 2011 interview, aviation researcher Richard Haines said that he and his colleagues at the National Aviation Reporting Center on Anomalous Phenomena (NARCAP) preferred the term "unidentified aerial phenomena" (UAP) for "a wide range of atmospheric phenomena and effects" that might have differing explanations. Limited institutional or scientific study has given rise to independent researchers and UFO organizations such as APRO, NICAP, CUFOS, and MUFON from the mid-20th century onward.

== In popular culture ==
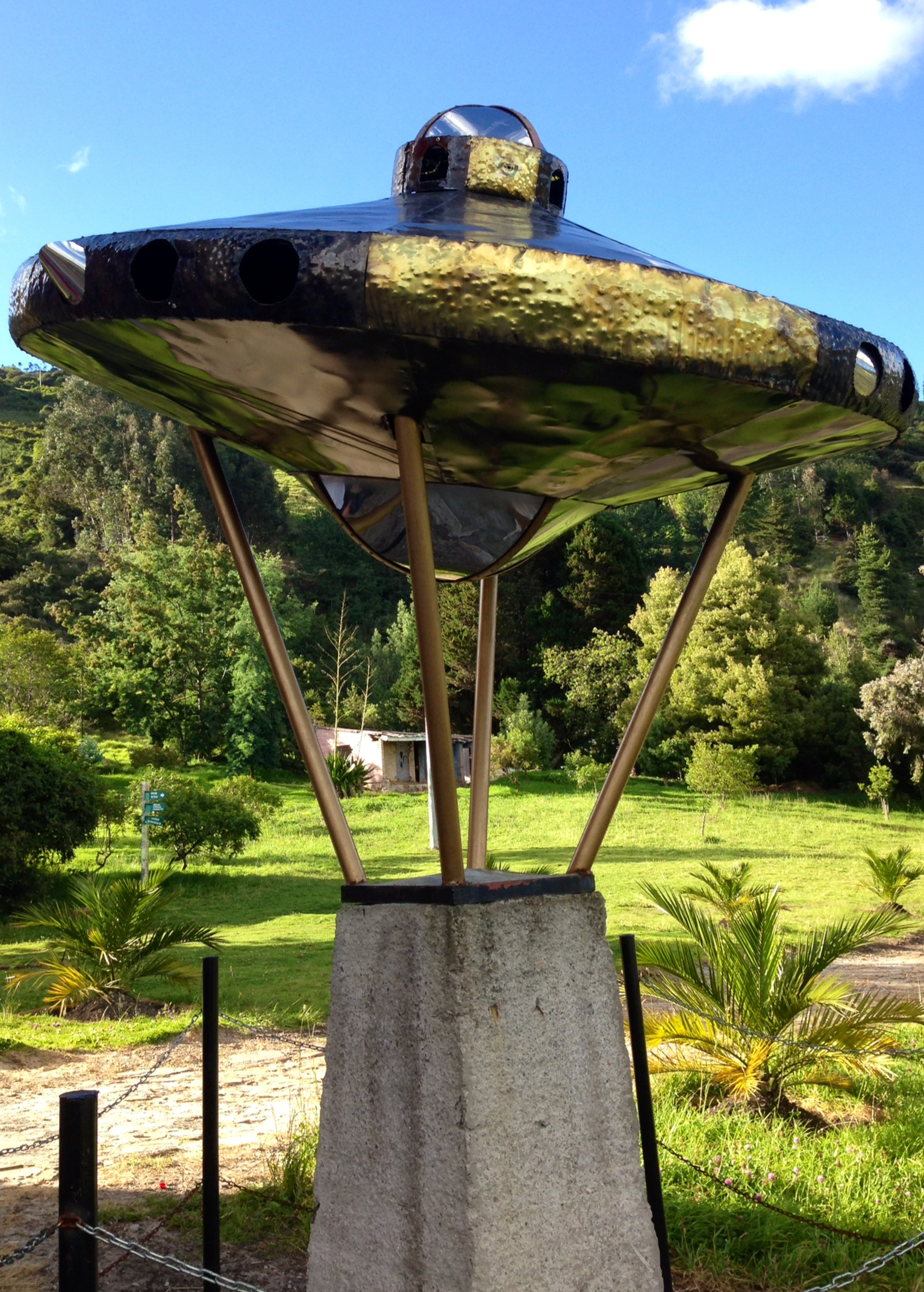
A UFO monument in Tenjo, Colombia.

UFOs have constituted a widespread international cultural phenomenon since the 1950s. Gallup Polls rank UFOs near the top of lists for subjects of widespread recognition. In 1973, a survey found that 95 percent of the public reported having heard of UFOs, whereas only 92 percent had heard of U.S. President Gerald Ford in a 1977 poll taken just nine months after he left the White House. A 1996 Gallup poll found that 71 percent of Americans believed the U.S. government knew more about UFOs than it was telling the public. A 2002 Roper Poll for the Sci-Fi Channel found similar results, as 48 percent thought aliens had visited the Earth; 56 percent thought UFOs were real craft; and 70 percent felt the government was not sharing everything it knew about UFOs or extraterrestrial life.

Flying-saucer imagery also entered science fiction and other popular culture. Examples include the C-57D in Forbidden Planet (1956), the saucer-shaped the Jupiter 2 in Lost in Space, and the saucer section of the USS Enterprise in Star Trek. UFOs and extraterrestrials have been featured in many movies. The intense secrecy surrounding the Nevada base known as Area 51 has made it a frequent subject of conspiracy theories and a longstanding part of UFO popular culture. In July 2019, more than a million people marked themselves as going and nearly a million more as interested in a satirical Facebook event proposing to storm Area 51. Two music festivals in rural Nevada, "AlienStock" and "Storm Area 51 Basecamp", were subsequently organized to capitalize on the popularity of the original Facebook event. 150 people showed up to the Area 51 entrance and attendance at the festivals was 1,500.

== See also ==
- Unidentified submerged object

== Bibliography ==
=== General ===
- Bullard, Thomas; (2012). The Myth and Mystery of UFOs. Lawrence: University of Kansas. ISBN 978-0-7006-1729-6.
- Clark, Jerome (1998). The UFO Book: Encyclopedia of the Extraterrestrial. Detroit, MI: Visible Ink Press. ISBN 1-57859-029-9. LCCN 97035767. OCLC 37370629. Many classic cases and UFO history provided in great detail; highly documented.
- Curran, Douglas (2001) [1st edition originally published 1985; New York: Abbeville Press]. In Advance of the Landing: Folk Concepts of Outer Space. Foreword by Tom Wolfe (Revised ed.). New York: Abbeville Press. ISBN 0-7892-0708-7. LCCN 00052589. OCLC 45270419. Non-sensational but fair treatment of contemporary UFO legend and lore in N. America, including the so-called "contactee cults". The author traveled the United States with his camera and tape recorder and directly interviewed many individuals.
- Deardorff, J.; Haisch, B.; Maccabee, B.; Puthoff, H. E. (2005). "Inflation-Theory Implications for Extraterrestrial Visitation". Journal of the British Interplanetary Society. 58. London: British Interplanetary Society: 43–50. Bibcode:2005JBIS...58...43D. ISSN 0007-084X. Archived from the original on July 8, 2024.
- Friedman, Stanton T. (2008). Flying Saucers and Science: A Scientist Investigates the Mysteries of UFOs. Franklin Lakes, NJ: New Page Books. ISBN 978-1-60163-011-7. LCCN 2008006291. OCLC 179812690.
- Greer, Steven M.; (2001). Disclosure. Crozer: Crossing Point. ISBN 0-9673238-1-9.
- Hall, Richard H., ed. (1997) [Originally published 1964; Washington, D.C.: National Investigations Committee On Aerial Phenomena (NICAP)]. The UFO Evidence (Reissue ed.). New York: Barnes & Noble Books. ISBN 0-7607-0627-1. LCCN 64006912. OCLC 39544334. Well-organized, exhaustive summary and analysis of 746 unexplained NICAP cases out of 5000 total cases—a classic.
- Hall, Richard H., ed. (2001). UFO Evidence: Volume II, A 30-year Report. Lanham, MD: Scarecrow Press. ISBN 0-8108-3881-8. LCCN 00055624. OCLC 44391782. Another exhaustive case study, more recent UFO reports.
- Hendry, Allan (1979). The UFO Handbook: A Guide to Investigating, Evaluating, and Reporting UFO Sightings. Foreword by J. Allen Hynek. Garden City, NY: Doubleday. ISBN 0-385-14348-6. LCCN 78008211. OCLC 4642190. Skeptical but balanced analysis of 1300 CUFOS UFO cases.
- Hynek, J. Allen (1972). The UFO Experience: A Scientific Inquiry. Chicago: Henry Regnery Company. LCCN 76183827. OCLC 341112.
- Hynek, J. Allen (1997) [Originally published 1977; New York: Dell Publishing Company]. The Hynek UFO Report. New foreword by Jacques Vallée. New York: Barnes & Noble Books. ISBN 0-7607-0429-5. OCLC 3601609. Analysis of 640 high-quality cases through 1969 by UFO legend Hynek.
- Jacobs, David M., ed. (2000). UFOs and Abductions: Challenging the Borders of Knowledge. Lawrence: University Press of Kansas. ISBN 0-7006-1032-4. LCCN 00028970. OCLC 43615835.
- Kean, Leslie (2010). UFOs: Generals, Pilots and Government Officials Go on the Record. Harmony Books.
- Kérizo, Alain (1997). Les OVNI identifiés: les extraterrestres dans le mystère d'iniquité (in French). Villegenon: Éd. Sainte Jeanne d'Arc. ISBN 978-2-9504914-8-0. OCLC 465784973. Archived from the original on July 8, 2024. (associated article Archived April 12, 2015, at the Wayback Machine)
- Keyhoe, Donald (1950). The Flying Saucers are Real. New York: Fawcett Publications. LCCN 50004886. OCLC 1674240. Archived from the original on September 6, 2013.
- Keyhoe, Donald E. (1953). Flying Saucers from Outer Space. New York: Henry Holt and Company. LCCN 53009588. OCLC 181368. Archived from the original on May 14, 2013.
- Latagliata, Rosamaria (2006). UFO: verità o menzogna?. Gli atlanti di Voyager (in Italian). Florence: Giunti Editore. ISBN 978-88-09-04698-6. OCLC 635701671.
- McCarthy, Paul E. (1975). Politicking and Paradigm Shifting: James E. McDonald and the UFO Case Study (Thesis/dissertation) (Internet ed.). Canterbury, CT: Sign Historical Group. OCLC 663722044. Archived from the original on September 10, 2012.
- Menzel, Donald H.; Taves, Ernest H. (1977). The UFO Enigma: The Definitive Explanation of the UFO Phenomenon. Introduction by Fred L. Whipple. Garden City, NY: Doubleday. ISBN 0-385-03596-9. LCCN 76016255. OCLC 2597609.
- Mitchell, Edgar; (2008). The Way of the Explorer. Franklin Lakes: Career Press. ISBN 978-1-56414-977-0.
- Office of the Director of National Intelligence (USA); (2021). Preliminary Assessment: Unidentified Aerial Phenomena Archive.
- "Reasons to Believe (a collection of short articles by nine different authors)". New York. April 1, 2018. pp. 25–33.
- Rose, Bill; Buttler, Tony (2004). Flying Saucer Aircraft. Secret Projects. Hinckley, England: Midland Publishing. ISBN 978-1-85780-233-7. OCLC 99774524.
- Sagan, Carl; Page, Thornton, eds. (1996) [1972]. UFO's: A Scientific Debate (Reprint ed.). New York: Barnes & Noble. ISBN 978-0-7607-0196-6. LCCN 72004572. OCLC 35840064.
- Scully, Frank (1950). Behind the Flying Saucers. New York: Henry Holt and Company. OCLC 1467735.
- Sheaffer, Robert (1981). The UFO Verdict: Examining the Evidence. Buffalo, NY: Prometheus Books. ISBN 0-87975-146-0. LCCN 80084406. OCLC 7364885.
- Sheaffer, Robert (1998). UFO Sightings: The Evidence. Amherst, NY: Prometheus Books. ISBN 1-57392-213-7. LCCN 98006410. OCLC 38738821. Revised edition of The UFO Verdict.
- Stanford, Ray (1976). Socorro 'Saucer' in a Pentagon Pantry. Austin, TX: Blueapple Books. ISBN 0-917092-00-7. LCCN 76013768. OCLC 2524239.
- Sturrock, Peter A.; Holzer, T. E.; Jahn, R.; et al. (1998). "Physical Evidence Related to UFO Reports: The Proceedings of a Workshop Held at the Pocantico Conference Center, Tarrytown, New York, September 29 – October 4, 1997" (PDF). Journal of Scientific Exploration. 12 (2). Stanford, CA: Society for Scientific Exploration: 179–229. ISSN 0892-3310. Archived from the original (PDF) on January 7, 2010. Sturrock panel report on physical evidence.
- Sturrock, Peter A. (1999). The UFO Enigma: A New Review of the Physical Evidence. New York: Warner Books. ISBN 0-446-52565-0. LCCN 99066643. OCLC 42645835.
- Vallée, Jacques (2008) [Originally published 1991; New York: Ballantine Books]. Revelations: Alien Contact and Human Deception. San Antonio, TX: Anomalist Books. ISBN 978-1-933665-30-6. LCCN 91091858. OCLC 225866107.
- Viberti, Pier Giorgio (2010) [Originally published 1997]. Incontri ravvicinati: Avvistamenti e contatti da mondi lontani. Atlanti del sapere (in Italian). Florence: Giunti Editore. ISBN 978-88-09-75032-6. OCLC 800130536.

=== History ===
- Clarke, David (2009). The UFO Files: The Inside Story of Real-Life Sightings. Kew: The National Archives. ISBN 978-1-905615-50-6. OCLC 316039535. Reports from the UK government files.
- Cohen, Daniel (1981). The Great Airship Mystery: A UFO of the 1890s. Dodd, Mead & Co. ISBN 0-396-07990-3.
- Dolan, Richard M. (2000). UFOs and the National Security State: An Unclassified History, Volume One: 1941–1973. Rochester, NY: Keyhole Publishing Company. ISBN 0-9677995-0-3. LCCN 00691087. OCLC 45546629. Dolan is a professional historian.
- Downes, Jonathan; Wright, Nigel (2005). The Rising of the Moon (Revised ed.). Bangor, Northern Ireland: Xiphos Books. ISBN 978-0-9544936-5-3. OCLC 70335856.
- Fawcett, Lawrence; Greenwood, Barry J. (1992) [Originally published 1984 as Clear Intent; Englewood Cliffs, NJ: Prentice Hall]. The UFO Cover-up: What the Government Won't Say. Foreword by J. Allen Hynek (1st Fireside ed.). New York: Simon & Schuster. ISBN 0-671-76555-8. LCCN 84009818. OCLC 28384401. Many UFO documents.
- Good, Timothy (1988). Above Top Secret: The Worldwide UFO Cover-Up. Foreword by Lord Hill-Norton (1st Quill ed.). New York: William Morrow and Company. ISBN 0-688-09202-0. LCCN 88208434. OCLC 707516815. Many UFO documents.
- Good, Timothy (1997) [1996]. Beyond Top Secret: The Worldwide UFO Security Threat. Foreword by Lord Hill-Norton (Fully revised and updated ed.). London: Pan Books. ISBN 0-330-34928-7. OCLC 38490850.
- Good, Timothy (2007). Need to Know: UFOs, the Military, and Intelligence. New York: Pegasus Books. ISBN 978-1-933648-38-5. OCLC 180767460. Update of Above Top Secret with new cases and documents
- Graff, Garrett M. (2023). UFO: The Inside Story of the US Government's Search for Alien Life Here―and Out There. Avid Reader Press / Simon & Schuster. ISBN 978-1-9821-9677-6.
- Hall, Michael D.; Connors, Wendy A. (1998). Alfred Loedding & the Great Flying Saucer Wave of 1947 (PDF). Albuquerque, NM: White Rose Press. OCLC 41104299. Archived (PDF) from the original on March 25, 2018.
- Keel, John (1996) [Originally published 1970 as UFOs: Operation Trojan Horse; New York: G. P. Putnam's Sons]. Operation Trojan Horse (PDF). Lilburn, GA: IllumiNet Press. ISBN 978-0-9626534-6-9. LCCN 96014564. OCLC 34474485. Archived from the original (PDF) on April 20, 2013.
- Kocher, George (November 1968). UFOs: What to Do (PDF). RAND Corporation. DRU-1571. Archived (PDF) from the original on March 19, 2013. UFO historical review, case studies, review of hypotheses, recommendations.
- Maccabee, Bruce (2000). UFO FBI Connection: The Secret History of the Government's Cover-Up. St. Paul, MN: Llewellyn Publications. ISBN 1-56718-493-6. LCCN 00028277. OCLC 43634902.
- Randle, Kevin D. (1997). Project Blue Book Exposed. New York: Marlowe & Company. ISBN 1-56924-746-3. LCCN 97072378. OCLC 37047544.
- Ruppelt, Edward J. (1956). The Report on Unidentified Flying Objects. Garden City, NY: Doubleday & Company, Inc. LCCN 56005444. OCLC 1941793. Archived from the original on May 16, 2011. A UFO classic by insider Ruppelt, the first head of the USAF Project Blue Book.
- Swords, Michael; Powell, Robert; et al. (2012). UFOs and Government: A Historical Inquiry. San Antonio, TX: Anomalist Books. ISBN 978-1-933665-58-0. OCLC 809977863.
- Weinstein, Dominique F. (February 2001). Unidentified Aerial Phenomena: Eighty Years of Pilot Sightings (PDF). Boulder Creek, CA: National Aviation Reporting Center on Anomalous Phenomena (NARCAP). NARCAP TR-04. Archived (PDF) from the original on June 12, 2013.

=== Psychology ===
- Haines, Richard F., ed. (1979). UFO Phenomena and the Behavioral Scientist. Metuchen, NJ: Scarecrow Press. ISBN 0-8108-1228-2. LCCN 79014878. OCLC 5008381.
- Jung, C G (1978) [Originally published 1958 as Ein moderner Mythus: von Dingen, die am Himmel gesehen werden]. Flying Saucers: A Modern Myth of Things Seen in the Skies. Translation by R.F.C. Hull. Princeton, NJ: Princeton University Press. ISBN 0-691-01822-7. LCCN 78004325. OCLC 4762238.
- Simón, Armando (February 1976). "UFOs: Testing for the existence of Air Force censorship". Psychology: A Journal of Human Behavior. 13 (1): 3–5. ISSN 0033-3077.
- Simón, Armando (1981). "A Nonreactive, Quantitative Study of Mass Behavior with Emphasis on the Cinema as Behavior Catalyst". Psychological Reports. 48 (3). Ammons Scientific: 775–785. doi:10.2466/pr0.1981.48.3.775. ISSN 0033-2941. S2CID 143670471.
- Simón, Armando (1984). "Psychology and UFOs". Skeptical Inquirer. 8. Amherst, NY: Committee for Skeptical Inquiry: 355–367.

=== Technology ===
- Ford, L. H.; Roman, Thomas A. (1996). "Quantum field theory constrains traversable wormhole geometries". Physical Review D. 53 (10): 5496–5507. arXiv:gr-qc/9510071. Bibcode:1996PhRvD..53.5496F. doi:10.1103/PhysRevD.53.5496. ISSN 0556-2821. PMID 10019835. S2CID 18106362.
- Hill, Paul R. (1995). Unconventional Flying Objects: A Scientific Analysis. Charlottesville, VA: Hampton Roads Publishing Company. ISBN 1-57174-027-9. LCCN 97109204. OCLC 34075199. Analysis of UFO technology by pioneering NACA/NASA aerospace engineer.
- Krasnikov, S. (2003). "The quantum inequalities do not forbid spacetime shortcuts". Physical Review D. 67 (10) 104013. arXiv:gr-qc/0207057. Bibcode:2003PhRvD..67j4013K. doi:10.1103/PhysRevD.67.104013. S2CID 17498199.
- Rullán, Antonio F. (July 2, 2000). "Odors from UFOs: Deducing Odorant Chemistry and Causation from Available Data" (PDF) (Preliminary paper). Archived (PDF) from the original on February 2, 2014.
- Sarfatti, Jack (2006). Super Cosmos: Through Struggles to the Stars. Indianapolis, IN: AuthorHouse. ISBN 978-1-4184-7662-5. LCCN 2004095148. OCLC 70962499.

=== Skepticism ===
- Plait, Philip C. (2002). "Misidentified Flying Objects: UFOs and Illusions of the Mind and Eye". Bad Astronomy: Misconceptions and Misuses Revealed, from Astrology to the Moon Landing "Hoax". Illustrations by Tina Cash Walsh. New York: John Wiley & Sons, Inc. ISBN 0-471-40976-6. LCCN 2002277382. OCLC 48885221.
- Ridpath, Ian. "Astronomical Causes of UFOs". Ian Ridpath. Archived from the original on March 3, 2026.
- Seeds, Michael (1995) [1981]. Horizons: Exploring the Universe (2nd ed.). Belmont, CA: Wadsworth Publishing. ISBN 0-534-24889-6. LCCN 94013521. OCLC 30156735.(Appendix A)
- Sheaffer, Robert (2012) [2011]. Psychic Vibrations: Skeptical Giggles from the Skeptical Inquirer (2nd ed.). Charleston, SC: CreateSpace. ISBN 978-1-4636-0157-7. Archived from the original on January 16, 2013.
