= Black triangle (UFO) =

UFOs with triangular shape and dark color

Drawing of the Phoenix Lights, an example of a black triangle UFO sighting

Black triangles are UFOs reported as having a triangular shape and dark color, typically observed at night, described as large, silent, hovering, moving slowly, and displaying pulsating, colored lights which they can turn off.

== British sightings and UK Ministry of Defence Report ==
"An example UAP formation of the triangular type," depicted in a Technical Memorandum on the subject of UAP commissioned by the British government. In 2011, a Belgian man revealed that this photo was a hoax he created using a piece of styrofoam and four lightbulbs.

A declassified report from the UK Ministry of Defence, addressing Unidentified Aerial Phenomena (UAP) within the UK Air Defence Region and code named Project Condign, includes analyses of black triangle sightings.

The report states that the majority, if not all sightings can be attributed to "buoyant plasmas" that are capable of traveling at enormous speeds under the influence of electrical charges in the atmosphere. The report also notes that "at least some" of the black triangle observations likely arise from meteor entry into the atmosphere. Additionally, the authors recommend that no attempt be made on the part of aircraft to intercept or outmaneuver these objects, and instead to place them astern to mitigate the risk of collision.

Regarding the triangular shapes, the report also states: "Occasionally ... it seems that a field with, as yet, undetermined characteristics, can exist between certain charged buoyant objects in loose formation, such that, depending on the viewing aspect, the intervening space between them forms an area (viewed as a shape, often triangular) from which the reflection of light does not occur. This is a key finding in the attribution of what have frequently been reported as black 'craft,' often triangular and even up to hundreds of feet in length."

The report also states that the hypothesized plasma formations, through their "magnetic, electric or electromagnetic" fields, could have the potential to induce in observers vivid, but mainly incorrect, perceptions.

The Project Condign report was not peer-reviewed, and some authors doubt its scientific validity. According to a report published by The Guardian, the study's author was unable to communicate with experts who might have been able to advise him about the credibility of his findings, due to Project Condign's classified status. This explains the report's "baffling" conclusions, which are on the "fringes of scientific understanding".

== Other sightings ==
On September 8, 1960, a "triangular formation of lights with a red light in the center" was reported over Tyneside, North England. On September 15, a triangle was reported above the Douglas Aircraft plant in Santa Monica, California. The California sightings were attributed to a weather balloon attached to a sonic recorder.

=== 1980s Hudson Valley sightings ===
During the early 1980s, several hundred people claimed to have witnessed UFOs flying over, or near to, the Hudson River in New York state. These sightings involved hovering or slowly-flying V-shaped objects rimmed with colorful lights. Several pilots claimed responsibility for these UFOs, reporting that the objects, some tracked to a local airport and parking lot, were ultralight aircraft flown in formation.

=== 1989–1992 Belgian wave ===
The Belgian UFO wave began in November 1989. The events of 29 November were documented by over thirty different groups of witnesses and three separate groups of police officers. All of the reports related to a large object flying at a low altitude. The craft was flat and triangular, with lights underneath. This giant craft did not make a sound as it slowly moved across the landscape of Belgium.

Black triangle UFOs have been claimed to be visible to radar. During the 1989–1990 Belgian UFO wave, two Belgian Air Force F-16s attempted to intercept an object detected by radar, but the pilots did not report seeing an object.

The Belgian UFO wave has been disputed by skeptics, and a famous photograph associated with the wave has been revealed as a hoax.

=== 1997 Phoenix Lights incident ===
A widely reported appearance(s) of black triangles involved the "Phoenix Lights" events, during which multiple unidentified objects were observed near Phoenix, Arizona and videotaped by both the local media and residents beginning on Thursday, 13 March 1997. Some observed objects/lights appeared to be grouped in a large "V" formation that lingered for several minutes. Some residents reported one of the black triangles spotted earlier to be over a mile wide and that it drifted slowly over their houses, blocking out the night sky's stars.

Investigators identified the objects as a formation of A-10 Thunderbolt II aircraft flying over Phoenix while returning to Davis-Monthan. The US Air Force reported the testing of aircraft-launched flares during that period.

=== 2000 Southern Illinois incident ===
The "St. Clair Triangle", "UFO Over Illinois", "Southern Illinois UFO", or "Highland, Illinois UFO" sighting occurred on 5 January 2000 over the towns of Highland, Dupo, Lebanon, Shiloh, Summerfield, Millstadt, and O'Fallon, Illinois, beginning shortly after 4:00 am. The incident was featured in several television shows including Seeing is Believing, a Discovery Channel special UFOs Over Illinois, and an episode of the Syfy series Proof Positive. Sufjan Stevens included this incident in the song "Concerning the UFO Sighting Near Highland, Illinois" from his 2005 album Illinois. The FAA said sighting reports may have been due to an advertising blimp operated in the area by the American Blimp Company.

=== 2004–2006 Tinley Park Lights ===
Three hovering red lights were seen by multiple witnesses in Tinley Park and Oak Forest, Illinois, on 21 August 2004, two months later on 31 October 2004, again on 1 October 2005, and once again on 31 October 2006. Some witnesses photographed the lights and captured them on video. According to some ufologists, the video evidence suggests that the lights kept the triangular geometrical shape they formed and moved as if they were attached through a dark object. The incident was examined in a Dateline NBC episode on 18 May 2008, and in the episode "Invasion Illinois" of the television series UFO Hunters, which premiered on The History Channel on 29 October 2008.

=== 2008 Stephenville, Texas ===
Around 8 January 2008, approximately 40 people saw a large triangular UFO in Stephenville, Texas. One witness, a veteran pilot, estimated the object was half a mile wide and one mile long. Military officials in West Texas denied witness reports that fighter jets had pursued the object.

== Military aircraft ==
Classified military aircraft may be responsible for many black triangle UFO reports. Several such sightings have been reported over Antelope Valley, an area of desert in Southern California. This stretch of desert draws people interested in potential "black project" aircraft because it is close to several known military research and testing areas, such as Edwards Air Force Base and United States Air Force Plant 42. A geographic analysis by the now-inactive National Institute for Discovery Science suggested that black triangles might be U.S. Air Force craft.

At least some of the proposed military types may be fictitious. The Northrop TR-3A Black Manta is a speculative surveillance aircraft purported to belong to the United States Air Force and to have been developed under a black project. It was said to be a subsonic stealth spy plane with a flying wing design. It was alleged to have been used in the Gulf War to provide laser designation for Lockheed F-117 Nighthawk bombers, for targeting to use with laser-guided bombs (since the F-117 possesses a laser designator, the reason for both aircraft being utilized is unclear). There is little evidence to support the TR-3's existence; however, it is possible that black triangle UFO reports associated with Black Manta could be a technology demonstrator for a potential new-generation tactical reconnaissance aircraft, and/or that "TR-3" refers to a Technical Refresh of an existing program.

Geoscientist Ben McGee has identified border patrol drones with infrared anti-collision or identification lights to explain some black triangles.

== See also ==
- Flying wing
