= Starchild skull =

Archaeological find

The Starchild skull

The Starchild skull is part of a malformed human skull of a child who likely died as a result of congenital hydrocephalus. It received widespread publicity after paranormalist Lloyd Pye claimed it was of extraterrestrial origin.

== Claims of Lloyd Pye ==
Pye claimed to have obtained the skull from Ray and Melanie Young of El Paso, Texas, in February 1999, stating that the skull was found around 1930 in a mine tunnel about 100 miles (160 km) southwest of Chihuahua, Mexico, buried alongside a normal human skeleton that was exposed and lying face up on the surface of the tunnel.

Pye claimed the skull to be a hybrid offspring of an extraterrestrial and a human female.

== Assessment of the evidence ==
A dentist who examined the upper right maxilla found with the skull determined that the skull was that of a child aged 4.5 to 5 years. The volume, however, of the interior of the Starchild skull is 1,600 cubic centimeters, which is 200 cm³ larger than the average adult's brain, and 400 cm³ larger than an adult of the same approximate size. The orbits are oval and shallow, with the optic nerve canal situated closer to the bottom of the orbit than to the back. There are no frontal sinuses. The back of the skull is flattened. The skull consists of calcium hydroxyapatite, the normal material of mammalian bone.

Neurologist Steven Novella of Yale University Medical School says that the cranium exhibits all of the characteristics of a child who has died as a result of congenital hydrocephalus, and the cranial deformations were the result of accumulations of cerebrospinal fluid within the skull.

DNA testing in 1999 at BOLD (Bureau of Legal Dentistry), a forensic DNA lab in Vancouver, British Columbia, found standard X and Y chromosomes in two samples taken from the skull. Novella considers this "conclusive evidence" that the child was both male and human, and that both of his parents must have been human in order for each to have contributed one of the human sex chromosomes.

Further DNA testing in 2003 at Trace Genetics, which specializes in extracting DNA from ancient samples, isolated mitochondrial DNA from the skull. The child belongs to haplogroup C. Since mitochondrial DNA is inherited exclusively from the mother, it makes it possible to trace the offspring's maternal lineage. The DNA test therefore confirmed that the child's mother was a Haplogroup C human female. However, the adult female found with the child belonged to haplogroup A. Both haplotypes are characteristic Native American haplogroups, but the different haplogroup for each skull indicates that the adult female was not the child's mother.

Paranormal researcher Benjamin Radford states that often "anything not immediately explainable or obvious is interpreted as a baffling mystery, often with paranormal connotations. ... Science fiction speculation is fun but should not eclipse the real science and significance of these stories".

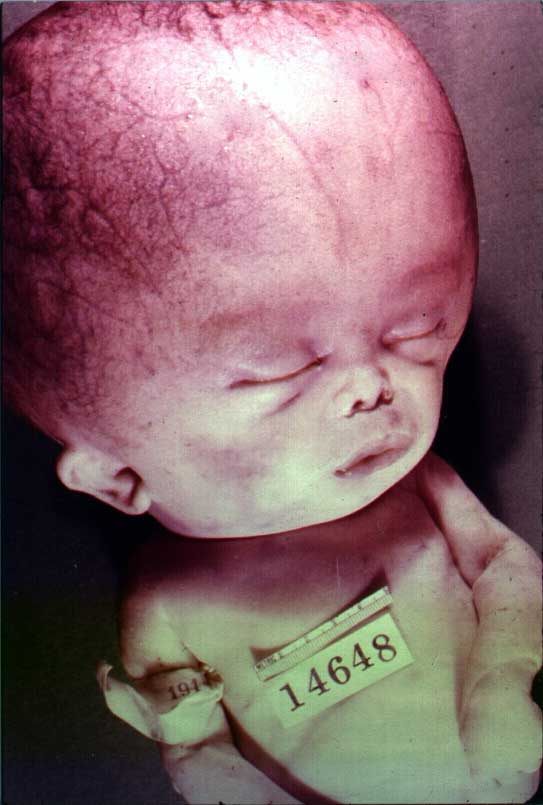
Young children with hydrocephalus typically have an abnormally large head, as fluid pressure causes individual skull bones to bulge outward.

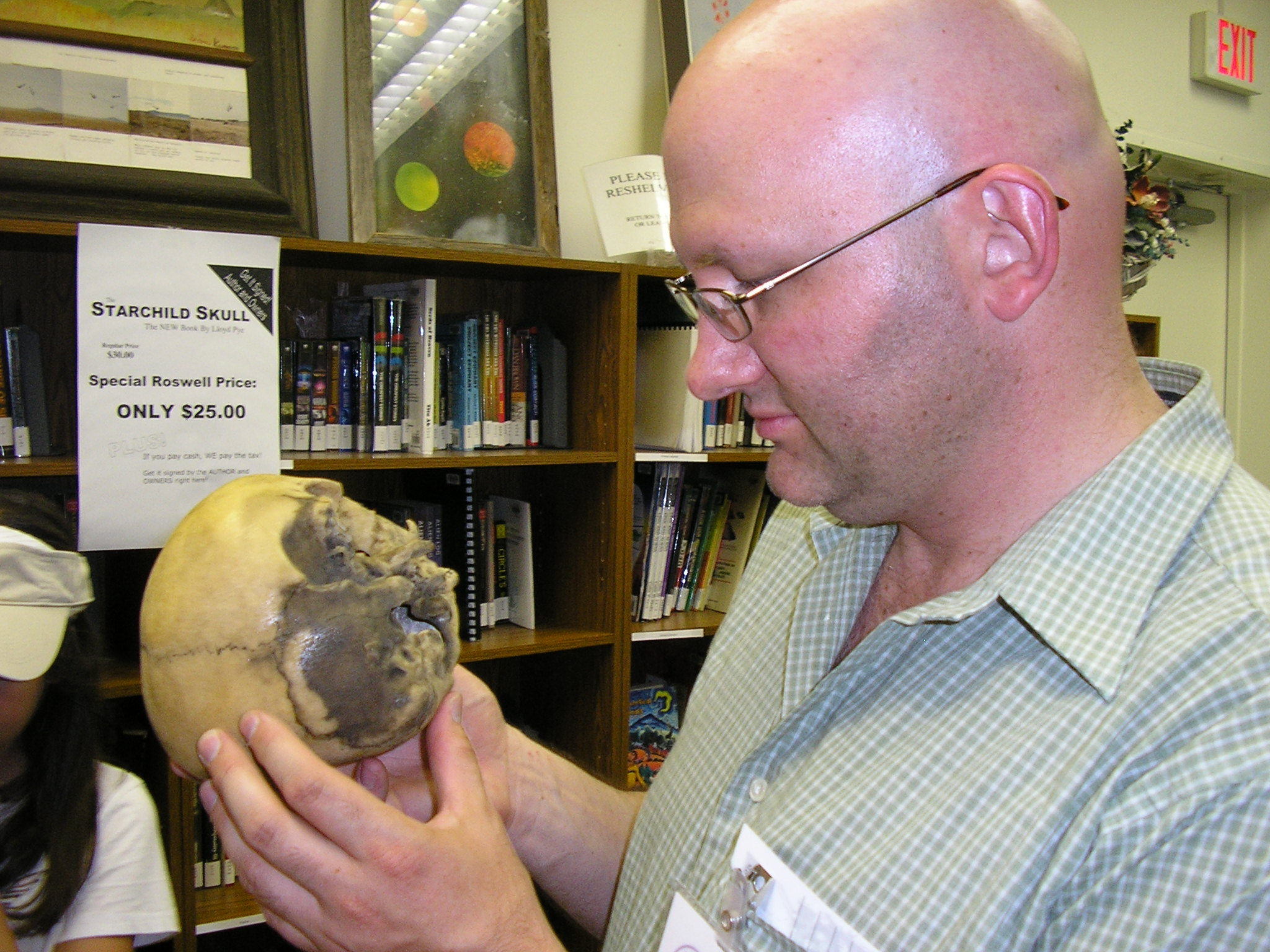
Benjamin Radford examines a replica of the "Starchild Skull," claimed to be an alien/human hybrid, at the Roswell UFO festival

== See also ==
- Alyoshenka
- Atacama skeleton
