= Wisconsin Sikh temple shooting =

2012 terrorist attack in Wisconsin, U.S.

- Wisconsin Sikh temple shooting (Wisconsin) Wisconsin Sikh temple shooting (the United States)
- Location: 42°54′29″N 87°54′39″W; Sikh Temple of Wisconsin; 7512 S. Howell Avenue; Oak Creek, Wisconsin, U.S.
- Date: August 5, 2012; 14 years ago 10:25 a.m. (CDT)
- Target: Worshippers at a Sikh temple
- Attack type: Mass shooting, murder-suicide, mass murder, domestic terrorism, hate crime
- Weapon: 9mm Springfield XD(M) semi-automatic pistol
- Deaths: 8 (Note: including a victim who died in 2020) (including the perpetrator)
- Injuries: 3
- Perpetrator: Wade Michael Page
- Motive: White supremacy

The Wisconsin Sikh temple shooting was a mass shooting that took place at the gurdwara (Sikh temple) in Oak Creek, Wisconsin, on August 5, 2012, when 40-year-old Wade Michael Page fatally shot six people and wounded four others. A seventh victim died of his wounds in 2020. Page committed suicide by shooting himself in the head.

Page was an American white supremacist and Army veteran from Cudahy, Wisconsin. Apart from the shooter, all of the dead were members of the Sikh religion. The incident drew responses from President Barack Obama and Indian Prime Minister Manmohan Singh. Dignitaries attended candlelight vigils in countries such as the U.S., Canada, and India. First Lady Michelle Obama visited the temple on August 23, 2012.

== Shooting and police response ==
The gurdwara was preparing langar, a Sikh communal meal, for later in the day. Witnesses suggested that women and children would have been at the temple preparing for the meal at the time of the incident, as children's classes were scheduled to begin at 11:30 a.m.

Wade Michael Page was armed with a 9mm Springfield XD(M) semi-automatic pistol. Page had legally purchased the gun in Wisconsin.

Following emergency calls around 10:25 a.m. CDT, police responded to a shooting at a Sikh gurdwara located in Oak Creek, Wisconsin. On arrival, they engaged the gunman, later identified as Wade Michael Page, who had shot several people at the temple, killing six. Page wounded an officer; after being shot in the stomach by another, he fatally shot himself in the head. Four people were killed inside the temple, and three people, including Page, died outside. Page killed five men and one woman, ranging in age from 39 to 84.

Three men were transported to Froedtert Hospital, including one of the responding officers.

Initial reports said the gunman had died from being shot by police officers at the scene, but the FBI later clarified that Page, after being shot by an officer, died from a self-inflicted gunshot wound to the head.

Authorities released an audio recording of the incident, during which the first responding officer, Lieutenant Brian Murphy, was shot by the gunman. It contained the words "I have someone walking out the driveway towards me. Man with a gun, white t-shirt", followed by the sound of gunfire. In September 2012, authorities released video recordings taken by squad cars during the incident, including the moments when Murphy was shot, and the gunman being shot by another officer. Murphy was shot fifteen times by Page, but survived.

The Joint Terrorism Task Force investigated the site, and Oak Creek police chief John Edwards said his force treated the incident as a "domestic terrorism incident" in "the beginning stages of this investigation". Oak Creek police handed the investigation over to the FBI. They also investigated possible ties to white supremacist groups and other racial motivations. The FBI said there was no reason to think anyone else was involved in the attack, and they were not aware of any past threat made against the temple. U.S. Attorney General Eric Holder described the incident as "an act of terrorism, an act of hatred, a hate crime".

== Victims ==
The six victims killed included one woman, Paramjit Kaur, 41; and five men, Satwant Singh Kaleka, 65, the founder of the gurdwara; Prakash Singh, 39, a Granthi; Sita Singh, 41; Ranjit Singh, 49; and Suveg Singh, 84. All of the male victims wore turbans as part of their Sikh faith. Four of the victims were Indian nationals, while the rest were Americans. Prakash Singh, who was born in India and had served as a Granthi at the Gurudwara for around seven years, had received his green card in early 2012.

The injured included a responding officer, Lt. Brian Murphy, who was shot fifteen times at close range, including once in the face and once in the back of the head. He was discharged from the hospital on August 22, 2012. Sikhs for Justice, a New York–based group, pledged a $10,000 award to Murphy. Two Sikh residents of Yuba City, California donated another $100,000 to Lieutenant Murphy and praised his bravery.

Among those injured was Baba Punjab Singh, a Sikh Granthi, who suffered a gunshot wound to the head. The injury left him partially paralyzed and unable to breathe independently or speak. Singh died on March 2, 2020, at the age of 72. His death was ruled a homicide.

== Perpetrator ==
Wade Michael Page (November 11, 1971 – August 5, 2012) was an American white supremacist living in Cudahy, Wisconsin. Page was born and grew up in Colorado. He served in the U.S. Army from April 1992 through October 1998, In the Army, Page had learned to repair the Hawk missile system, before becoming a psychological operations specialist. He was demoted and received a general discharge for "patterns of misconduct," including being drunk while on duty and going absent without leave.

After his discharge, Page returned to Colorado, living in the Denver suburb of Littleton from 2000 through 2007. Page worked as a truck driver from 2006 to 2010, but was fired after receiving a citation for impaired driving due to drinking.

Page had ties to white supremacist and neo-Nazi groups, and was reportedly a member of the Hammerskins. He entered the white power music scene in 2000, becoming involved in several neo-Nazi bands. He founded the band End Apathy in 2005 and played in the bands Definite Hate and Blue Eyed Devils, all considered racist white-power bands by the Southern Poverty Law Center.

Page's former step-mother apologized to the Sikh victims and said she had not been in touch with her stepson for the past twelve years, after divorcing his father. A former friend described him as a "loner" and said he had talked about an "impending racial holy war". According to his neighbors, Page lived alone, rarely left his apartment, and avoided eye contact with them.

Page legally purchased the handgun used in the shooting on July 28, 2012, at a gun shop in West Allis, Wisconsin. Page passed the background checks required, and paid cash for the gun, along with three 19-round magazines. The owner of the gun shop said that Page's appearance and demeanor in the shop "raised no eyebrows whatsoever".

Following the shooting, photographs of Page appeared in media reports showing him with a range of tattoos on his arms and upper body, which were said to show his links to white supremacist organizations.

Oak Creek Police Chief John Edwards declined to speculate on the motive behind the attack, saying "I don't know why, and I don't know that we'll ever know, because when he died, that died with him what his motive was or what he was thinking."

== Reactions ==
U.S. President Barack Obama offered his condolences, calling the country's Sikh community "a part of our broader American family," and ordered flags at federal buildings flown at half-staff until August 10 to honor the victims. Obama called for "soul searching" on how to reduce violence. Wisconsin Governor Scott Walker and other officials also issued statements of sympathy for the victims of the shooting and their families. Nancy Powell, who was then the United States Ambassador to India, attended prayers for the victims at Gurudwara Bangla Sahib in New Delhi. Indian Prime Minister Manmohan Singh said that the attack being at a Sikh temple added to the pain, and stated that India stood in support of all peace-loving Americans who condemned the shooting. Following the incident, there were vigils as well as some protests against the United States by Sikhs in India. On August 9, Indian members of parliament in New Delhi joined ranks in parliament to offer condolences to families of the victims. Jathedar Giani Gurbachan Singh, the highest-ranking Sikh Granthi in the faith, called the shooting a "security lapse" by the U.S. government, and recommended that Sikhs in the United States adopt all possible security measures at their temples. Oak Creek Sikh residents said the incident had shocked their community.

Many Sikh Americans did not approve of the protests in India against the United States, and strongly condemned the actions, such as flag-burnings, taken by the protesters. U.S.-based Sikh community groups pledged assistance to the victims and their families, and urged Sikh Americans to organize interfaith vigils. They also organized to send an emergency response team to Wisconsin. In some online forums, individuals with far right views expressed support for the gunman and his actions.

Many other Americans held candlelight vigils in support of the Sikh community, and dignitaries such as Governor Walker attended. Congressman Paul Ryan introduced a bill in Congress condemning the tragedy which stated the House "condemns the senseless attack". On September 19, 2012, a Congressional hearing addressed hate crimes in response to the tragedy, before the Senate Judiciary Committee's Subcommittee on the Constitution, Civil Rights and Human Rights convened by Senator Dick Durbin.

In the aftermath of the shooting, Amar Kaleka, the son of Satwant Singh Kaleka, became involved in politics, supporting gun control and new legislation to reduce hate crimes. Kaleka criticized Obama, who visited the sites of other mass shootings, but not the Sikh Temple. As a member of the Democratic Party, Kaleka ran unsuccessfully in the Democratic primary for the United States House of Representatives in Wisconsin's 1st congressional district in the 2014 election. Pardeep Kaleka said that the shooting was "a warning of the increasingly public and violent role that white supremacy would play in the next decade."

Since 2013, the Sikh Coalition has encouraged Sikhs to use the National Day of Sevā to honor the lives of those lost in the shooting.

Political scientist Naunihal Singh criticized the media response, pointing out that the shooting received less media attention than other similar shootings. He suggested that this was due to the racial and religious identities of the shooter and victims.

== See also ==
- List of homicides in Wisconsin
- Murder of Balbir Singh Sodhi
- 2017 Olathe, Kansas shooting
- Indianapolis FedEx shooting
- List of rampage killers (religious, political, or ethnic crimes)
- 1984 anti-Sikh riots
