= Steven M. Greer =

American ufologist (born 1955)

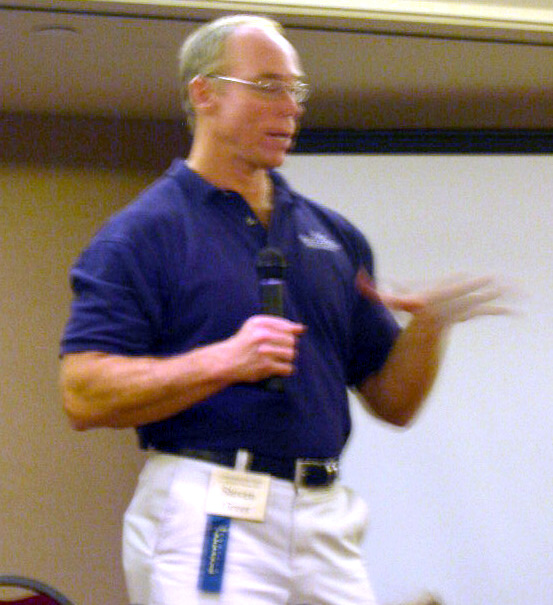
- Greer in 2007
- Born: 1955 (age 70–71); Charlotte, North Carolina, U.S.
- Occupations: Physician (retired); Ufologist

Steven Macon Greer (born 1955) is an American ufologist and a retired physician. He founded the Center for the Study of Extraterrestrial Intelligence (CSETI) and the Disclosure Project, which claims to seek the disclosure of alleged classified UFO information.

== Early life and education ==
Greer was born in Charlotte, North Carolina, in 1955. He claims he saw an unidentified flying object at close range when he was eight years old, and another UFO when he was 18.

He was trained as a Transcendental Meditation teacher and served as director of a meditation organization in the early 1970s.

He received a B.S. degree in biology from Appalachian State University in 1982 and an M.D. degree from the James H. Quillen College of Medicine of East Tennessee State University in 1987.

== Medical career ==
Greer received his Virginia medical license in 1989, and worked as an emergency room physician. In 1998, he decided to retire as a physician in favor of his ufology activities.

== Ufology career ==
Greer founded the Center for the Study of Extra-Terrestrial Intelligence (CSETI) in 1990 to create a diplomatic and research-based initiative to contact extraterrestrial civilizations. The group defined CE-5 or 'close encounters of the fifth kind' as human initiated contact and communication with extraterrestrial life. CSETI claims to have over 3,000 confirmed reports of UFO sightings by pilots and over 4,000 of what they describe as landing traces. The organisation uses RAMITs ('Rapid Mobilisation Investigative Teams') with the aim of arriving at landing sites as quickly as possible. CSETI has defined a psychic protocol for human initiated contact to UFOs.

In 1993, Greer founded the Disclosure Project, the goal of which is to publicly disclose the government's alleged knowledge of UFOs, extraterrestrial intelligence, and advanced energy and propulsion systems. Greer describes the Disclosure Project as an effort to grant amnesty to government whistleblowers willing to violate their security oaths by sharing classified information about UFOs.

In October 1994, Greer appeared in Larry King's TV special The UFO Coverup?

In May 2001, Greer held a press conference at the National Press Club in Washington, D.C. that featured 20 retired Air Force, Federal Aviation Administration and intelligence officers.

== Documentaries ==
In 2013, Greer co-produced Sirius, a documentary detailing his work and hypotheses regarding extraterrestrial life, government cover-ups and close encounters of the fifth kind. The film was directed by Amardeep Kaleka and narrated by Thomas Jane, and covers Greer's 2006 book Hidden Truth, Forbidden Knowledge. The movie premiered on April 22, 2013, in Los Angeles, California, and features interviews from former government and military officials. Sirius depicts a six-inch (15 cm) human skeleton known as the Atacama skeleton, which was claimed to be an alien skeleton. Genetic evidence, however, demonstrated that it was human, with genetic markers found in "indigenous women from the Chilean region of South America". The director of the center that performed the genetic analysis said, "It's an interesting medical mystery of an unfortunate human with a series of birth defects."

In 2017, Unacknowledged, a crowdfunded documentary featuring Greer was released. It was directed by Michael Mazzola and narrated by Giancarlo Esposito. After debuting on iTunes and digital platforms on May 9, Unacknowledged moved to the number one documentary spot on those platforms internationally, and number two in the U.S.

Close Encounters of the Fifth Kind: Contact has Begun was released April 2020. The documentary was directed and written by Michael Mazzola and features Greer, Daniel Sheehan, Jan Harzan, and Russell Targ. Writing in Variety, film critic Owen Gleiberman described the film as "fantasy propaganda...a conspiracy documentary built around the thesis that the 'national security state' has concealed it from all of us," adding that "[Greer is] like a '70s computer nerd played by John Waters with a touch of Guy Pearce." Critic Noel Murray reported in the Los Angeles Times that the film was "overlong and rambling – more concerned with disconnected anecdotes than making a compelling case or telling an interesting story." John Defore of The Hollywood Reporter wrote that the film "is far too impassioned in its nuttiness to be a purely cynical, Scientology-style sham", that it "rather strangely squeezes the last few years of UFO-related news coverage into a misleading frame, arguing that journalists, pundits and the government are collaborating to build fear in the public that would justify the establishment of a 'one-world government' that could wage an 'interplanetary war'", and notes that "though [Greer's] been summoning [UFOs] from across the galaxy for decades, he can never convince an alien ship to travel an extra couple of miles and hover for a good photograph."
