= Atacama skeleton =

Mummified corpse from the Atacama Desert, Chile

Ata's skull

Ata (Spanish pronunciation: [ˈata]) is the common name given to the approximately 6-inch (15 cm) long skeletal remains of a premature human fetus discovered in 2003 near La Noria, an abandoned nitrate-mining settlement in Chile's Atacama Desert. The remains attracted international attention because of their unusually small size and elongated skull, leading to widespread but unsupported claims that they were of extraterrestrial origin. Scientific studies published in 2018 concluded that the remains were human, although researchers later disputed aspects of the genetic interpretation while agreeing that the skeleton was that of a human fetus.

The remains were discovered by Oscar Muñoz and later sold into private ownership. Their removal from Chile, subsequent scientific examination, and treatment as a curiosity prompted criticism from bioarchaeologists and anthropologists, leading to calls for their repatriation and a broader debate about the ethics of research involving human remains.

== Discovery ==
The skeletal remains later nicknamed Ata were discovered in 2003 by Oscar Muñoz near La Noria, an abandoned nitrate-mining settlement in Chile's Atacama Desert. Muñoz was exploring the ghost town when he found a small bundle wrapped in white cloth and tied with a purple ribbon. Inside was a partially mummified fetal skeleton measuring about 6 inches (15 cm) in length. The remains had an elongated, cone-shaped skull, a narrow face, and an unusually small body.

== Extraterrestrial claims ==
After its discovery, Ata's unusual appearance quickly gave rise to speculation that the remains were of extraterrestrial origin. The skeleton's small size, elongated skull, and uncommon physical features led to widespread claims within UFO circles that it represented evidence of extraterrestrial life, despite the absence of supporting scientific evidence.

Over the following decade, the claims spread beyond UFO communities and gained international attention. In 2013, the documentary Sirius, directed by Amardeep Kaleka and produced by UFO researcher Steven M. Greer, presented Ata as a possible extraterrestrial being. The film featured genetic testing by Stanford University geneticist Garry P. Nolan, who agreed to examine the remains after being contacted by the filmmakers. Following the film's release, Nolan's preliminary DNA analysis concluded that Ata was human and found no evidence to support claims of an extraterrestrial origin.

In March 2018, Nolan and colleagues published the first whole-genome sequencing study of Ata. The researchers concluded that the remains were those of a premature human fetus with genetic variants associated with skeletal development. Six months later, in September, bioarchaeologist Siân Halcrow and an international research team challenged the interpretation of those genetic findings but likewise concluded that the remains were human.

Since then, no credible scientific evidence has supported claims that Ata was of extraterrestrial origin.

== Analysis ==
Although initially thought to be older, the fetal remains have been dated to as recently as the late 1970s, and have been found to contain high-quality DNA, suitable for scientific analysis. The remains have an irregularly shaped skull and a total of 10 ribs, as opposed to 12 for adult humans, and potential signs of oxycephaly. Considering that the frontal suture of the skull is very open and the hands and feet not fully ossified, anatomist and paleoanthropologist William Jungers has suggested that it was a human fetus that was born prematurely and died before or shortly after birth.

An alternative hypothesis by Nolan is that Ata had a combination of genetic disorders that led to the fetus being aborted before term, and the pediatric radiologist Ralph Lachman has said that dwarfism alone could not account for all the features found in the fetus.

During the DNA analysis performed by Nolan, the B2 mtDNA haplotype group was found in the remains. Haplogroups identify human genetic populations that often are associated distinctly with particular geographic regions around the globe. Combined with the alleles found in the mitochondrial DNA contained in the remains, the findings suggested that Ata is indigenous to the western region of South America.

In March 2018, Nolan published additional results, stating that the fetus had a rare bone aging disorder as well as other genetic mutations in genes associated with dwarfism, scoliosis, and abnormalities in the muscles and skeleton. The researchers identified 64 unusual mutations in seven genes linked to the skeletal system, and they noted that finding so many mutations that specifically affect skeletal development had never been reported before.

== Controversy ==
A subsequent study, published in September 2018 by an international research team led by New Zealand's University of Otago Associate Professor of Bioarchaeology Siân Halcrow, questioned the March 2018 study by Nolan, stating: "As experts in human anatomy and skeletal development, we find no evidence for any of the skeletal anomalies claimed by the authors. Their observations of 'anomalies' represent normal skeletal development in the fetus, cranial moulding from delivery, and potential post-mortem taphonomic effects" and that the team was "sceptical" concerning the genomic results. The authors also raised ethical concerns about the work by Nolan, saying that "studies such as these that do not address ethical considerations of the deceased and their descendant communities threaten to undo the decades of work anthropologists and others have put in to correct past colonialist tendencies."

Genome Research, the publisher of the 2013 study, responded by stating that the ethical standards did not cover work on "specimens of uncertain biological origins, such as the Atacama skeleton", but also stated their intention to review their own policies on such studies. The authors of the Genome Research article published a response acknowledging the ethical concerns and calling for the repatriation of the remains. The researchers defended their work by clarifying that no members of the senior authorship team or their laboratories ever handled the skeleton directly, nor were they involved in its acquisition, removal, or export. Instead, they were provided with a small sample of bone (about 1 mm^{3}), removed by the Sirius documentary team in Spain, and their involvement was strictly limited to analysis of that sample, having no responsibility for the actions of previous handlers. They also made it clear that at the start of the research, it was not known that the specimen was human, nor had the age of the skeleton been determined. The researchers emphasized their intention to resolve the controversies surrounding the specimen, rather than perpetuate unethical practices.

== Ownership and calls for repatriation ==
After discovering Ata in 2003, the treasure hunter Oscar Muñoz sold the remains for approximately 30,000 Chilean pesos. The skeleton later passed into private ownership and was taken to Spain, where it was acquired by the businessman Ramón Navia-Osorio. Navia-Osorio owned the remains when they were made available for scientific examination in 2013 and for the later whole-genome sequencing study, published in 2018. The removal, private ownership, and scientific examination of the remains subsequently came under increased ethical and legal scrutiny. Later that year, Chilean authorities investigated whether Ata had been removed from the country illegally. Bioarchaeologists, anthropologists, and other researchers also called for the remains to be returned to Chile. Garry P. Nolan and the physician-scientist Atul Butte acknowledged these concerns and supported returning the remains to Chile.

== See also ==
- Alyoshenka, a similar fetus allegedly found in a village in Russia
