= The Unexplained Files =

- Genre: Documentary
- Country of origin: United States
- Original language: English
- No. of seasons: 2
- No. of episodes: 19

Production
- Running time: 50 minutes

Original release
- Network: Science Channel
- Release: August 28, 2013 – November 2, 2014

The Unexplained Files is an American television series on Science Channel that investigates paranormal and other unexplained phenomena.

According to a King Features spokesperson, it was the most watched series on the Science Channel during its first season in 2013 and had 8 episodes. The second season began July 29, 2014 and had 12 episodes planned.

== Reception ==
New York Times critic Neil Genzlinger criticized the show as covering a subject that has "long been overworked, and shows that examine the unexplained tend to focus on the same old esoteric mysteries rather than the practical ones right under our noses." In a review for Skeptical Inquirer Stephanie Kemmerer writes that she had expected that a show on The Science Channel would "reflect science, logic, and reason." She was disappointed saying the show "cleverly and sneakily led viewers to a single conclusion." The only expert in the cattle mutilation episode, veterinarian Truman Smith was given 30 seconds to explain that the mutilations were made by predators, most of the show time was given to "outlandish theories". In conclusion Kemmerer writes that the show is biased and sensationalistic.

== Episode list ==
=== Season 1 (2013–14) ===
No. overall	No. in season	Title	Original release date
1	1	"Valentich & Texas Blue Dogs"	August 28, 2013
2	2	"Freaky Fires & Ghost Yacht"	September 4, 2013
3	3	"Livestock Mutilation & Curse of the Ice Mummy"	September 11, 2013
4	4	"UFO, Mothman & Morgellon's Disease"	September 18, 2013
5	5	"Alien Rain, Beach Boom & Voynich Manuscript"	September 25, 2013
6	6	"Human Combustion & Carlos de los Santos"	October 2, 2013
7	7	"The Yeti"	June 1, 2014

=== Season 2 (2014) ===
No. overall	No. in season	Title	Original release date
8	1	"The Real Exorcist and Elk Extinction"	July 29, 2014
9	2	"Peruvian Alien Skull and Baltic Sea UFO"	August 5, 2014
10	3	"Paranormal Highway of America"	August 12, 2014
11	4	"Curse of Flannan Lighthouse and Aleshenka: Russian Mummy"	August 19, 2014
12	5	"Death From the Sky and Mexican Chupacabra"	August 26, 2014
13	6	"Siberian Lake Serpent and Mystery of the Bosnian Pyramid"	September 2, 2014
14	7	"Are Aliens Attacking Our Nuclear Arsenal"	September 9, 2014
15	8	"Lost Giants of Georgia and Bridge of Death"	September 16, 2014
16	9	"Mysteries at 30,000 Feet"	September 23, 2014
17	10	"Voodoo Zombies & Life After Death"	September 30, 2014
18	11	"Shadow People The Sun Miracle"	October 26, 2014
19	12	"Aliens, Monsters, and Demons: The New Evidence"	November 2, 2014
