= Baby Blues (2008 film) =

- Directed by: Lars Jacobson; Amardeep Kaleka
- Written by: Lars Jacobson
- Produced by: Zack Canepari; Amardeep Kaleka; Lars Jacobson
- Starring: Colleen Porch; Ridge Canipe; Joel Bryant; Kali Majors; Holden Thomas Maynard
- Cinematography: Matthew MacCarthy
- Edited by: Amardeep Kaleka
- Music by: Michael Filimowicz
- Distributed by: Sweat Shop Films
- Release date: August 5, 2008
- Running time: 85 minutes
- Country: United States
- Language: English

Baby Blues (also known as Cradle Will Fall) is a 2008 American psychological horror film co-directed by Lars Jacobson and Amar Kaleka, loosely based on the 2001 killings of five children by their mother Andrea Yates, although the film is set in the 1980s. It was filmed entirely in Savannah, Georgia by the company Neverending Light Productions.

== Plot ==
Set on a secluded family farm, a mother suffers a psychotic breakdown due to postpartum depression and after her husband, a truck driver, hits the road after only being home a day, she snaps, walking away with the baby to an upstairs bedroom.

Jimmy, the eldest son, trying to keep his younger brother and sister calm, starts cleaning up, but decides to check on his mother and discovers the horrible truth. His baby brother is dead and she’s preparing to also kill the rest of her children. Any hope for their survival rests on the shoulder of Jimmy, who is now the surrogate man of the house. After his mother tries to drown his sister, he knocks her out and attempts to keep his remaining two siblings safe.

Using his wits and knowledge of the farm, Jimmy fends off the woman he has always known and loved as his mother. She manages to catch the two younger children and kills them in typical slasher style. Jimmy manages to survive until his father arrives back after hearing him on a radio transmission. The film then cuts to a hospital and Jimmy is set to come home. His father then tells him that his mother is also coming home, much to Jimmy's surprise. We are then shown the mother, pregnant and singing rock-a-bye baby to herself.

== Cast ==
- Colleen Porch as Mom
- Ridge Canipe as James "Jimmy" Williams Jr.
- Joel Bryant as James Williams, Sr.
- Kali Majors as Cathy Williams
- Holden Thomas Maynard as Sammy Williams

== Release ==
The film was released on August 5, 2008 in the United States and was subject to mediocre reviews, often criticising the mother's dialogue but praising the acting.

On August 9, 2008 Baby Blues was released straight to DVD under the name Cradle Will Fall in the U.K.
