= Ridge Canipe =

American actor

- Born: July 13, 1994 (age 32); Laguna Beach, California, U.S.
- Occupation: Actor
- Years active: 2003–2014

Ridge Canipe (born July 13, 1994) is an American actor. Ridge is best known for his roles in Walk the Line (in which he played Johnny Cash as a child), the thriller Baby Blues in 2008 and the 2005 version of Bad News Bears. He also co-starred in the 231st presentation of the Hallmark Hall of Fame production Pictures of Hollis Woods which aired on CBS in December 2007. He helped Walk the Line castmate and friend Hailey Anne Nelson, write and issue a vegan cookbook for children by PETA.

He has also appeared in episodes of Desperate Housewives, as Danny Farrell, the paper boy of Wisteria Lane. Other appearances in television shows include guest roles in Angel, Cold Case, CSI and Drake & Josh. He has also appeared as young Dean Winchester in the CW TV series Supernatural.

== Filmography ==
Year	Title	Role	Notes
2005	Walk the Line	Young Johnny Cash	
2008	Baby Blues	James ‘Jimmy’ Williams Jr.	
2021	Coach	Coach Ray	Also Writer and Producer
2021	Coach 2	Coach Ray	Also Writer and Producer
2022	Curtain Dancers		Writer
2023	Om Reunion	Himself	Cameo

== Television ==
Year	Title	Role	Notes
2003	Lucky	Young Michael	Episode: Leaving Las Vegas
2004	Cold Case	Tim Barnes (1980)	Episode: Glued
2004	Angel	Tommy	Episode: Smile Time
2004	The District	Little Jack Mannion	Episode: On Guard
2005	Desperate Housewives	Danny Farrell	Episode: You Could Drive a Person Crazy
2006	Drake & Josh	Neil	Episode: Megan's New Teacher
2006	CSI: Crime Scene Investigation	Lucas Hanson	Episode: Burn Out
2006-2007	Supernatural	Young Dean Winchester	2 episodes
2007	Pictures of Hollis Woods	Steven Regan	TV Movie
2007	Desperate Housewives	Danny Farrell	Episode: Getting Married Today
2009	Outnumbered	Kyle Embry	TV Movie
