= 2014 United States House of Representatives elections in Wisconsin =

- November 4, 2014

All 8 Wisconsin seats to the United States House of Representatives
	Majority party	Minority party
Party	Republican	Democratic
Last election	5	3
Seats won	5	3
Seat change	Steady	Steady
Popular vote	1,233,336	1,102,581
Percentage	52.36%	46.81%
Swing	▲3.44%	▼3.61%

Republican
40–50%
50–60%
60–70%
70–80%
Democratic
50–60%
60–70%
70–80%

The 2014 United States House of Representatives elections in Wisconsin were held on Tuesday, November 4, 2014, to elect the eight U.S. representatives from the state of Wisconsin, one from each of the state's eight congressional districts. The elections coincided with the elections of other federal and state offices, including an election for Governor of Wisconsin.

== Overview ==
Results of the 2014 United States House of Representatives elections in Wisconsin by district:

District	Republican		Democratic		Others		Total		Result
District	Votes	%	Votes	%	Votes	%	Votes	%	Result
District 1	182,316	63.33%	105,552	36.66%	29	0.01%	287,897	100.00%	Republican hold
District 2	103,619	31.54%	224,920	68.46%	0	0.00%	328,539	100.00%	Democratic hold
District 3	119,540	43.46%	155,368	56.49%	128	0.05%	275,036	100.00%	Democratic hold
District 4	68,490	26.91%	179,045	70.34%	7,002	2.75%	254,537	100.00%	Democratic hold
District 5	231,160	69.55%	101,190	30.45%	0	0.00%	332,350	100.00%	Republican hold
District 6	169,767	56.81%	122,212	40.89%	6,865	2.30%	298,844	100.00%	Republican hold
District 7	169,891	59.29%	112,949	39.41%	3,721	1.30%	286,561	100.00%	Republican hold
District 8	188,553	65.04%	101,345	34.96%	0	0.00%	289,898	100.00%	Republican hold
Total	1,233,336	52.40%	1,102,581	46.85%	17,745	0.75%	2,353,662	100.00%	

== District 1 ==
2014 Wisconsin's 1st congressional district election
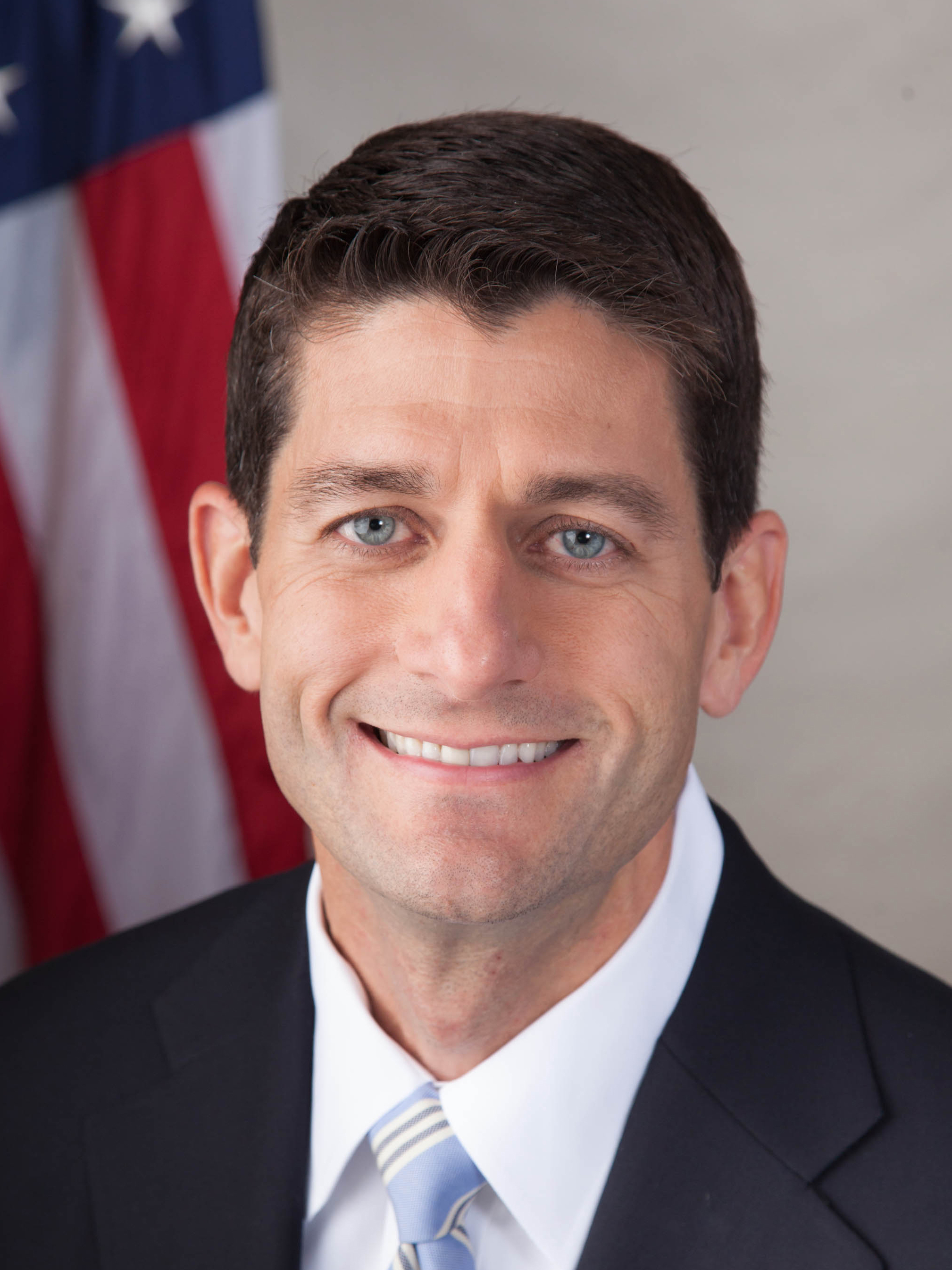

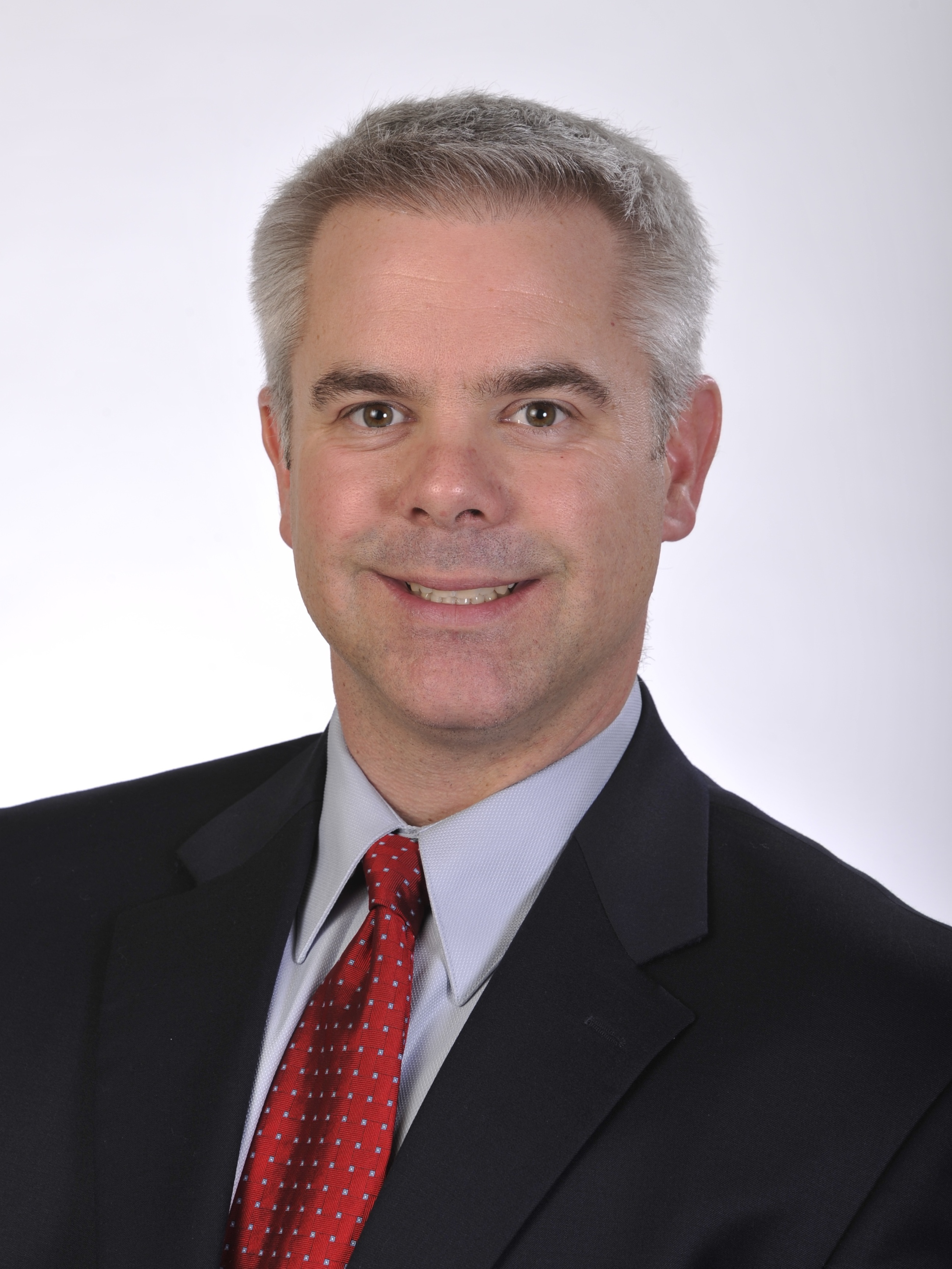
Nominee	Paul Ryan	Rob Zerban
Party	Republican	Democratic
Popular vote	182,316	105,552
Percentage	63.3%	36.6%
- Precinct results Ryan: 50–60% 60–70% 70–80% 80–90% >90% Zerban: 50–60% 60–70% 70–80% 80–90% >90% Tie: 40–50% 50% No votes
U.S. Representative before election
Paul Ryan
Republican
Elected U.S. Representative
Paul Ryan
Republican

Republican incumbent Paul Ryan, who had represented the 1st district since 1999, ran for re-election. This district has a PVI of R+3.

=== Republican primary ===
==== Candidates ====
===== Nominee =====
- Paul Ryan, incumbent U.S. Representative and nominee for Vice President in 2012

===== Eliminated in primary =====
- Jeremy Ryan, professional protester

==== Primary results ====
Republican primary results
Party	Candidate	Votes	%
Republican	Paul Ryan (incumbent)	40,813	94.3
Republican	Jeremy Ryan	2,450	5.7
Republican	Write-ins	30	0.0
Total votes		43,293	100.0

=== Democratic primary ===
==== Candidates ====
===== Nominee =====
- Rob Zerban, member of the Kenosha County Board, former small business owner and nominee for this seat in 2012

===== Eliminated in primary =====
- Amar Kaleka, documentary filmmaker and the son of a victim of the 2012 Wisconsin Sikh temple shooting

==== Primary results ====
Democratic primary results
Party	Candidate	Votes	%
Democratic	Rob Zerban	25,627	77.6
Democratic	Amar Kaleka	7,318	22.2
Democratic	Write-ins	71	0.2
Total votes		33,016	100.0

=== General election ===
==== Campaign ====
In 2012 Ryan, defeated Zerban in the closest election of Ryan's congressional career thus far.

==== Endorsements ====
Paul Ryan (R)

Organizations

- National Rifle Association - Political Victory Fund
- National Right to Life Committee
Rob Zerban (D)

Labor unions

- AFL-CIO
- International Brotherhood of Boilermakers

Organizations

- People for the American Way
- Progressive Democrats of America
- Sierra Club

==== Debates ====
- Complete video of debate, October 20, 2014

==== Polling ====
Poll source	Date(s) administered	Sample size	Margin of error	Paul Ryan (R)	Rob Zerban (D)	Undecided
New York Times/CBS News Battleground Tracker	October 16–23, 2014	433	± 7.0%	59%	35%	6%

==== Predictions ====
Source	Ranking	As of
The Cook Political Report	Safe R	November 3, 2014
Rothenberg	Safe R	October 24, 2014
Sabato's Crystal Ball	Safe R	October 30, 2014
RCP	Safe R	November 2, 2014
Daily Kos Elections	Safe R	November 4, 2014

==== Results ====
Wisconsin's 1st congressional district, 2014
Party	Candidate	Votes	%
Republican	Paul Ryan (incumbent)	182,316	63.3
Democratic	Rob Zerban	105,552	36.6
Libertarian	Keith Deschler (write-in)	29	0.0
n/a	Write-ins	273	0.1
Total votes		288,170	100.0
Republican hold			

== District 2 ==
2014 Wisconsin's 2nd congressional district election
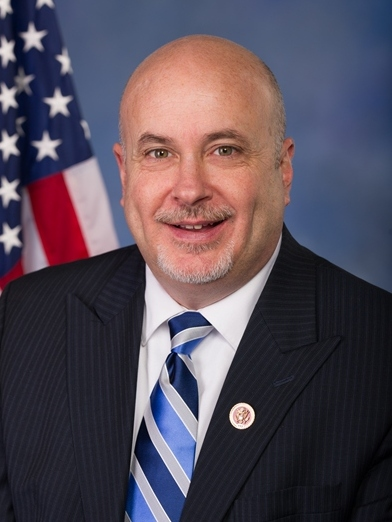

Nominee	Mark Pocan	Peter Theron
Party	Democratic	Republican
Popular vote	224,920	103,619
Percentage	68.4%	31.5%
- Precinct results Pocan: 50–60% 60–70% 70–80% 80–90% >90% Theron: 50–60% 60–70% 70–80% >90% Tie: 50% No votes
U.S. Representative before election
Mark Pocan
Democratic
Elected U.S. Representative
Mark Pocan
Democratic

Democratic incumbent Mark Pocan, who had represented the 2nd district since 2013, ran for re-election. This district has a PVI of D+17.

=== Democratic primary ===
==== Candidates ====
===== Nominee =====
- Mark Pocan, incumbent U.S. Representative

==== Primary results ====
Democratic primary results
Party	Candidate	Votes	%
Democratic	Mark Pocan (incumbent)	52,517	99.6
Democratic	Write-ins	216	0.4
Total votes		52,733	100.0

=== Republican primary ===
==== Candidates ====
===== Nominee =====
- Peter Theron, mathematics professor

==== Primary results ====
Republican primary results
Party	Candidate	Votes	%
Republican	Peter Theron	12,464	99.8
Republican	Write-ins	20	0.2
Total votes		12,484	100.0

=== General election ===
==== Endorsements ====
Mark Pocan (D)

Labor unions

- AFL-CIO
- International Brotherhood of Boilermakers
- National Association of Letter Carriers

Organizations

- Human Rights Campaign
- National Organization for Women
- People for the American Way
- Progressive Change Campaign Committee
- Sierra Club

==== Polling ====
Poll source	Date(s) administered	Sample size	Margin of error	Mark Pocan (D)	Peter Theron (R)	Undecided
New York Times/CBS News Battleground Tracker	October 16–23, 2014	493	± 7.0%	66%	27%	7%

==== Predictions ====
Source	Ranking	As of
The Cook Political Report	Safe D	November 3, 2014
Rothenberg	Safe D	October 24, 2014
Sabato's Crystal Ball	Safe D	October 30, 2014
RCP	Safe D	November 2, 2014
Daily Kos Elections	Safe D	November 4, 2014

==== Results ====
Wisconsin's 2nd congressional district, 2014
Party	Candidate	Votes	%
Democratic	Mark Pocan (incumbent)	224,920	68.4
Republican	Peter Theron	103,619	31.5
n/a	Write-ins	308	0.1
Total votes		328,847	100.0
Democratic hold			

== District 3 ==
2014 Wisconsin's 3rd congressional district election
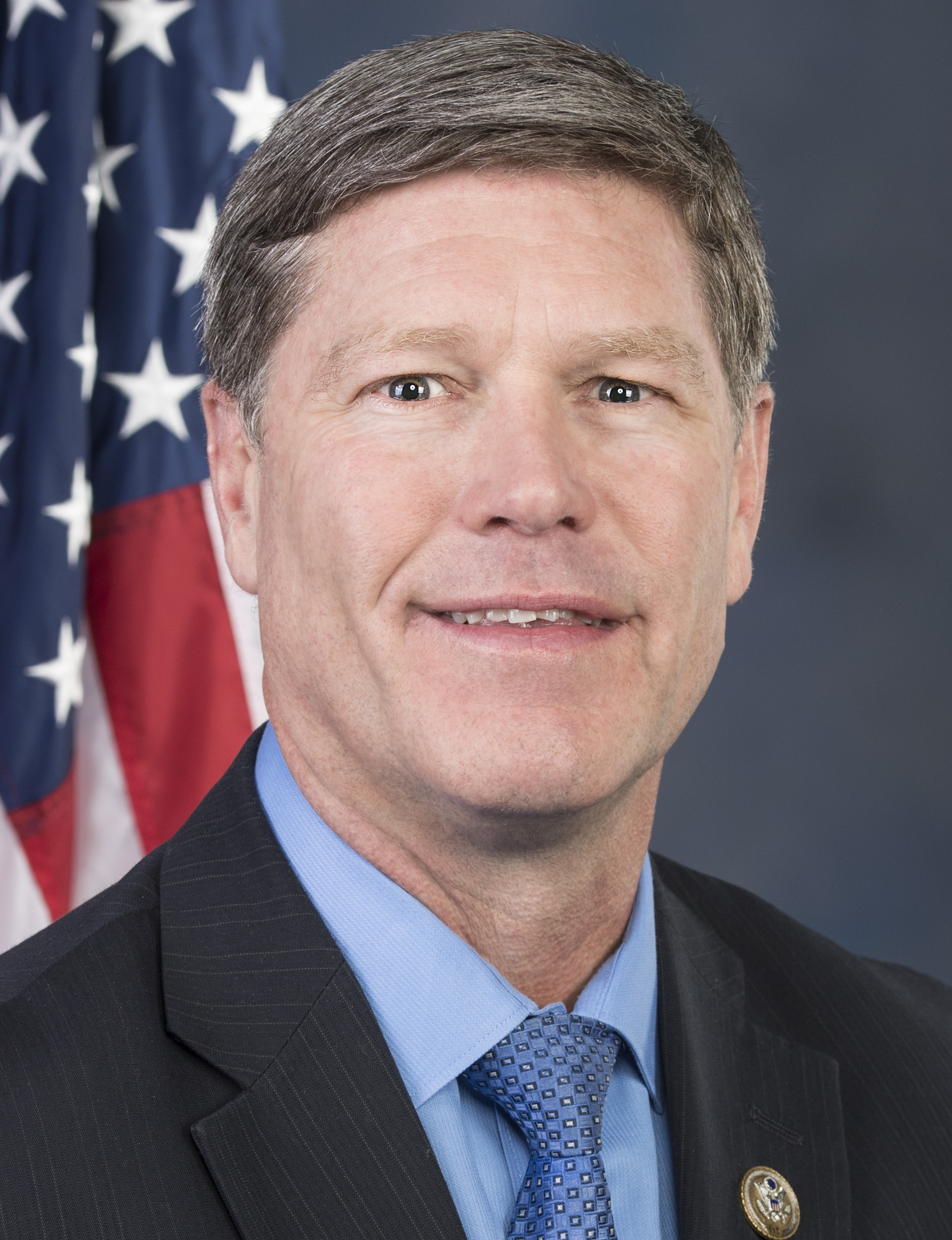

Nominee	Ron Kind	Tony Kurtz
Party	Democratic	Republican
Popular vote	155,368	119,540
Percentage	56.5%	43.4%
- Kind: 50–60% 60–70% 70–80% 80–90% >90% Kurtz: 40–50% 50–60% 60–70% >90% Tie: 40–50% 50% No votes
U.S. Representative before election
Ron Kind
Democratic
Elected U.S. Representative
Ron Kind
Democratic

Democratic incumbent Ron Kind, who had represented the 3rd district since 1996, ran for re-election. He was re-elected with 64% of the vote in 2012, and the district has a PVI of D+5.

=== Democratic primary ===
==== Candidates ====
===== Nominee =====
- Ron Kind, incumbent U.S. Representative

==== Primary results ====
Democratic primary results
Party	Candidate	Votes	%
Democratic	Ron Kind (incumbent)	28,783	99.8
Democratic	Write-ins	70	0.2
Total votes		28,853	100.0

=== Republican primary ===
==== Candidates ====
===== Nominee =====
- Tony Kurtz, businessman and veteran

===== Eliminated in primary =====
- Karen Mueller, attorney
- Ken Van Doren, former building contractor

===== Withdrawn =====
- Chris Anderson, former aide to Ron Johnson

==== Primary results ====
Republican primary results
Party	Candidate	Votes	%
Republican	Tony Kurtz	13,552	56.7
Republican	Karen L. Mueller	5,630	23.5
Republican	Ken Van Doren	4,704	19.7
Republican	Write-ins	30	0.0
Total votes		23,903	100.0

=== General election ===
==== Endorsements ====
Ron Kind (D)

Labor unions

- National Association of Letter Carriers

Organizations

- Human Rights Campaign
- New Democrat Coalition
- Sierra Club

==== Polling ====
Poll source	Date(s) administered	Sample size	Margin of error	Ron Kind (D)	Tony Kurtz (R)	Undecided
New York Times/CBS News Battleground Tracker	October 16–23, 2014	319	± 9.0%	51%	34%	15%

==== Predictions ====
Source	Ranking	As of
The Cook Political Report	Safe D	November 3, 2014
Rothenberg	Safe D	October 24, 2014
Sabato's Crystal Ball	Safe D	October 30, 2014
RCP	Safe D	November 2, 2014
Daily Kos Elections	Safe D	November 4, 2014

==== Results ====
Wisconsin's 3rd congressional district, 2014
Party	Candidate	Votes	%
Democratic	Ron Kind (incumbent)	155,368	56.5
Republican	Tony Kurtz	119,540	43.4
Independent	Ken Van Doren (write-in)	128	0.1
n/a	Write-ins	125	0.0
Total votes		275,161	100.0
Democratic hold			

== District 4 ==
2014 Wisconsin's 4th congressional district election
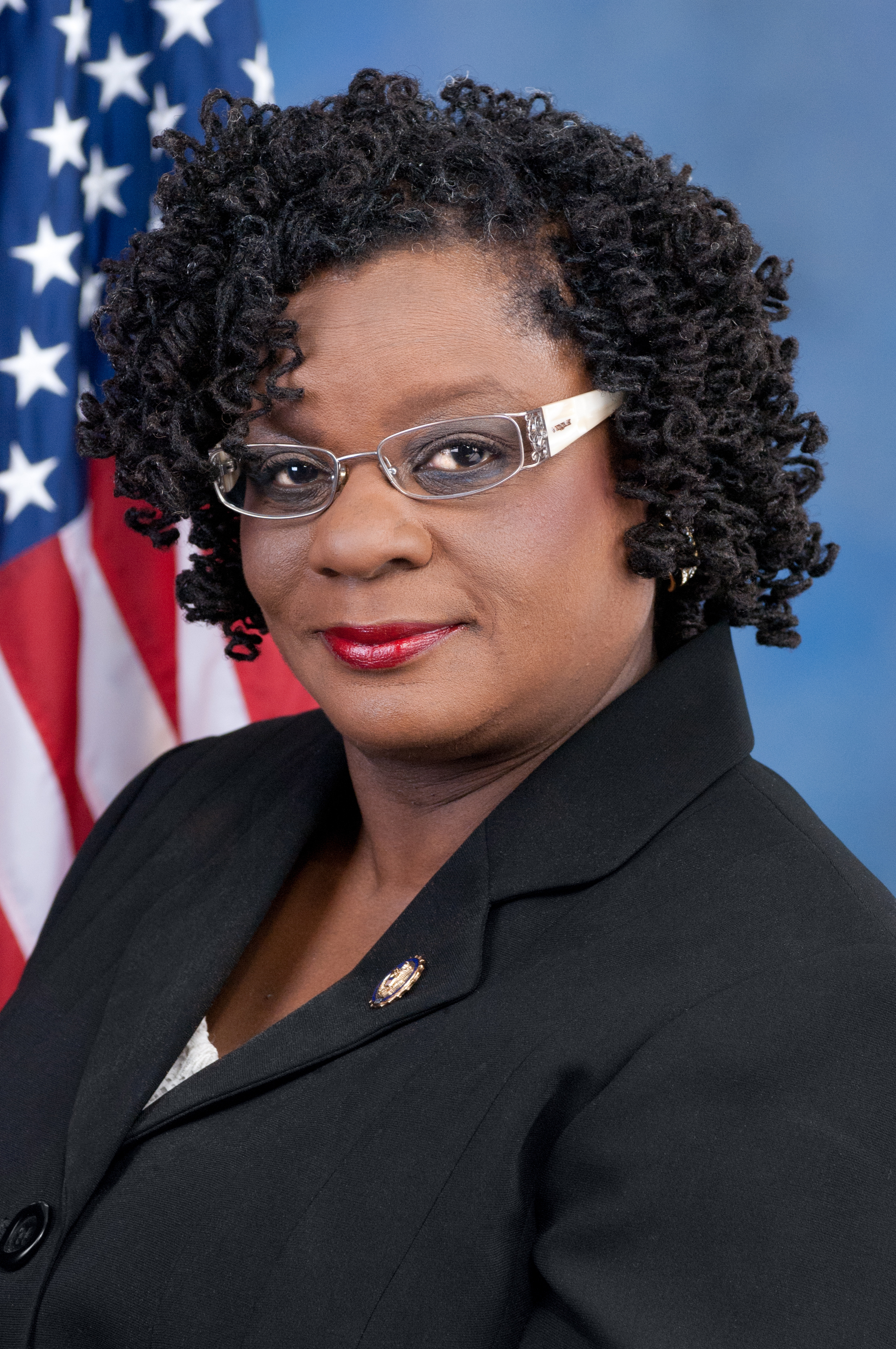

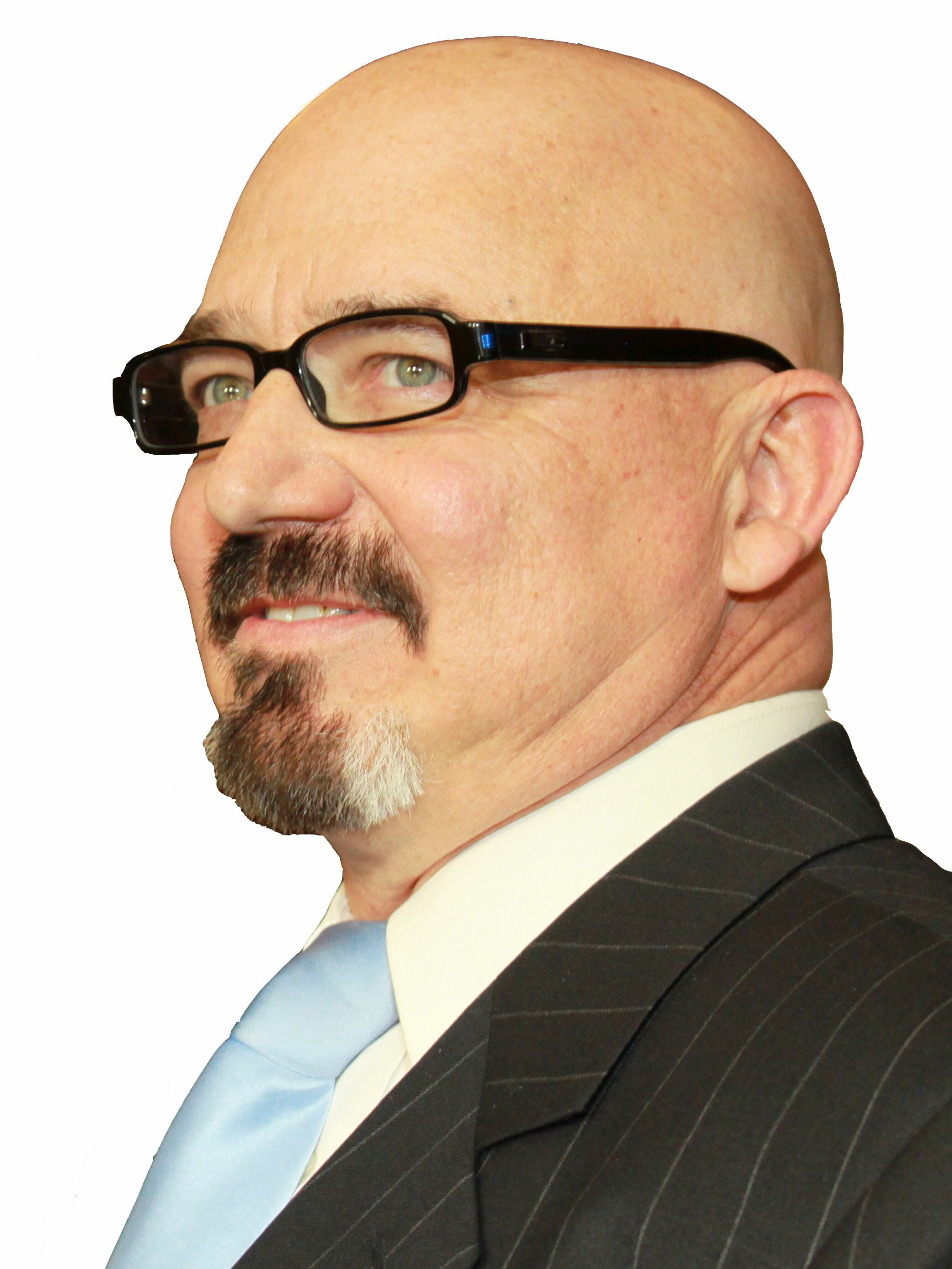
Nominee	Gwen Moore	Dan Sebring
Party	Democratic	Republican
Popular vote	179,045	68,490
Percentage	70.2%	26.9%
- Precinct results Moore: 40–50% 50–60% 60–70% 70–80% 80–90% >90% Sebring: 40–50% 50–60% 60–70% >90% Tie: 40–50% No votes
U.S. Representative before election
Gwen Moore
Democratic
Elected U.S. Representative
Gwen Moore
Democratic

Democratic incumbent Gwen Moore, who had represented the 4th district since 2005, ran for re-election. She was re-elected with 72% of the vote in 2012, and the district has a PVI of D+23.

=== Democratic primary ===
==== Candidates ====
===== Nominee =====
- Gwen Moore, incumbent U.S. Representative

===== Eliminated in primary =====
- Gary George, former state senator and convicted felon

==== Primary results ====
Democratic primary results
Party	Candidate	Votes	%
Democratic	Gwen Moore (incumbent)	52,413	70.9
Democratic	Gary R. George	21,242	28.7
Democratic	Write-ins	257	0.4
Total votes		73,912	100.0

=== Republican primary ===
==== Candidates ====
===== Nominee =====
- Dan Sebring, automobile repair shop owner and nominee for this seat in 2010 & 2012

===== Eliminated in primary =====
- David D. King, nominee for Secretary of State in 2010

==== Primary results ====
Republican primary results
Party	Candidate	Votes	%
Republican	Dan Sebring	3,386	79.7
Republican	David D. King	855	20.1
Republican	Write-ins	9	0.2
Total votes		4,250	100.0

=== General election ===
==== Endorsements ====
Gwen Moore (D)

Labor unions

- AFL-CIO
- International Brotherhood of Boilermakers
- National Association of Letter Carriers

Organizations

- Everytown for Gun Safety
- Human Rights Campaign
- National Organization for Women
- Sierra Club

==== Polling ====
Poll source	Date(s) administered	Sample size	Margin of error	Gwen Moore (D)	Dan Sebring (R)	Undecided
New York Times/CBS News Battleground Tracker	October 16–23, 2014	348	± 8.0%	63%	23%	14%

==== Predictions ====
Source	Ranking	As of
The Cook Political Report	Safe D	November 3, 2014
Rothenberg	Safe D	October 24, 2014
Sabato's Crystal Ball	Safe D	October 30, 2014
RCP	Safe D	November 2, 2014
Daily Kos Elections	Safe D	November 4, 2014

==== Results ====
Wisconsin's 4th congressional district, 2014
Party	Candidate	Votes	%
Democratic	Gwen Moore (incumbent)	179,045	70.2
Republican	Dan Sebring	68,490	26.9
Independent	Robert R. Raymond (write-in)	7,002	2.8
n/a	Write-ins	355	0.1
Total votes		254,892	100.0
Democratic hold			

== District 5 ==
2014 Wisconsin's 5th congressional district election
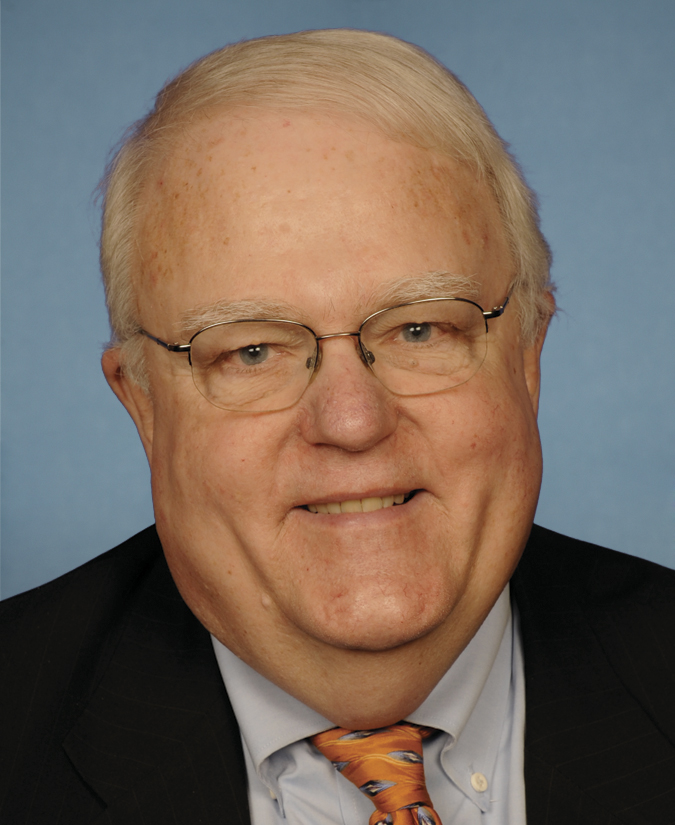

Nominee	Jim Sensenbrenner	Chris Rockwood
Party	Republican	Democratic
Popular vote	231,160	101,190
Percentage	69.5%	30.4%
- Precinct results Sensenbrenner: 50–60% 60–70% 70–80% 80–90% >90% Rockwood: 40–50% 50–60% >90% No votes
U.S. Representative before election
Jim Sensenbrenner
Republican
Elected U.S. Representative
Jim Sensenbrenner
Republican

Republican incumbent Jim Sensenbrenner, who had represented the 5thdistrict since 1978, ran for re-election. He was re-elected with 67.72% of the vote in 2012, and the district has a PVI of R+13.

=== Republican primary ===
==== Candidates ====
===== Nominee =====
- Jim Sensenbrenner, incumbent U.S. Representative

==== Primary results ====
Republican primary results
Party	Candidate	Votes	%
Republican	Jim Sensenbrenner (incumbent)	43,266	99.8
Republican	Write-ins	82	0.2
Total votes		43,348	100.0

=== Democratic primary ===
==== Candidates ====
===== Nominee =====
- Chris Rockwood, electrical engineer and former candidate for the Wisconsin State Assembly

==== Primary results ====
Democratic primary results
Party	Candidate	Votes	%
Democratic	Chris Rockwood	21,715	99.7
Democratic	Write-ins	141	0.6
Total votes		21,856	100.0

=== General election ===
==== Endorsements ====
Jim Sensenbrenner (R)

Organizations

- National Rifle Association - Political Victory Fund
- National Right to Life Committee
Chris Rockwood (D)

Labor unions

- AFL-CIO
- International Brotherhood of Boilermakers

Organizations

- Progressive Democrats of America

==== Polling ====
Poll source	Date(s) administered	Sample size	Margin of error	Jim Sensenbrenner(R)	Chris Rockwood (D)	Undecided
New York Times/CBS News Battleground Tracker	October 16–23, 2014	517	± 7.0%	59%	29%	12%

==== Predictions ====
Source	Ranking	As of
The Cook Political Report	Safe R	November 3, 2014
Rothenberg	Safe R	October 24, 2014
Sabato's Crystal Ball	Safe R	October 30, 2014
RCP	Safe R	November 2, 2014
Daily Kos Elections	Safe R	November 4, 2014

==== Results ====
Wisconsin's 5th congressional district, 2014
Party	Candidate	Votes	%
Republican	Jim Sensenbrenner (incumbent)	231,160	69.5
Democratic	Chris Rockwood	101,190	30.4
n/a	Write-ins	476	0.1
Total votes		332,826	100.0
Republican hold			

== District 6 ==
2014 Wisconsin's 6th congressional district election
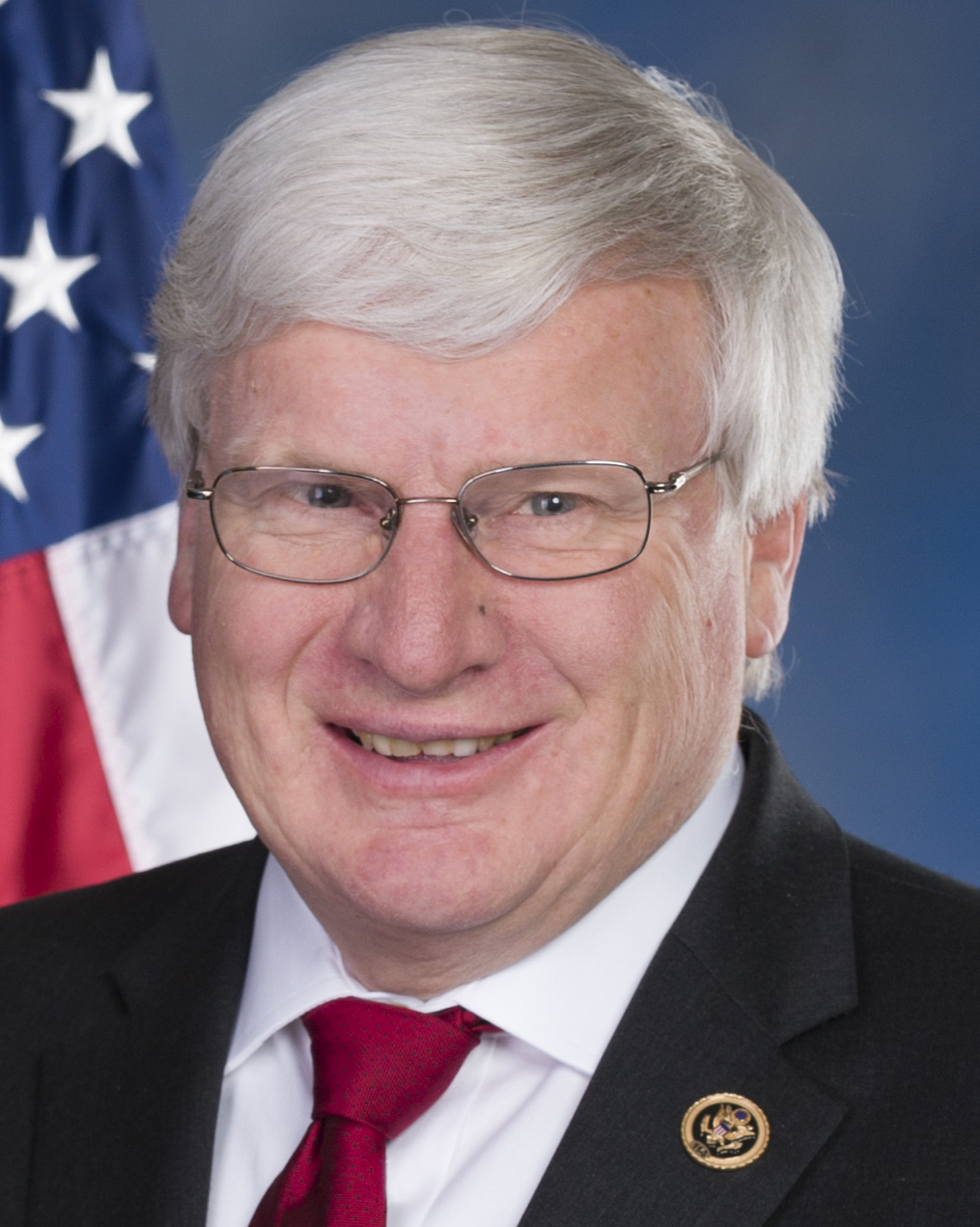

Nominee	Glenn Grothman	Mark Harris
Party	Republican	Democratic
Popular vote	169,767	122,212
Percentage	56.8%	40.9%
- Precinct results Grothman: 40–50% 50–60% 60–70% 70–80% 80–90% >90% Harris: 40–50% 50–60% 60–70% >90% Tie: 40–50% 50% No votes
U.S. Representative before election
Tom Petri
Republican
Elected U.S. Representative
Glenn Grothman
Republican

Republican incumbent Tom Petri who had represented the 6th district since 1979, retired.

=== Republican primary ===
==== Candidates ====
===== Nominee =====
- Glenn Grothman, state senator

===== Eliminated in primary =====
- Tom Denow
- Joe Leibham, state senator
- Duey Stroebel, state representative

===== Withdrawn =====
- Nancy Olson

===== Declined =====
- Joe Dean, Mayor of Port Washington
- Scott Fitzgerald, Majority Leader of the State Senate
- John Hiller, Scott Walker aide
- Tim Michels, co-owner of the Michels Corporation and nominee for the U.S. Senate in 2004
- Todd Nehls, former Dodge County Sheriff

==== Primary results ====
Republican primary results
Party	Candidate	Votes	%
Republican	Glenn Grothman	23,247	36.2
Republican	Joe Leibham	23,028	35.8
Republican	Duey Stroebel	15,873	24.7
Republican	Tom Denow	2,117	3.3
Republican	Write-ins	30	0.0
Total votes		64,295	100.0

=== Democratic primary ===
==== Candidates ====
===== Nominee =====
- Mark Harris, Winnebago County Executive

===== Withdrawn =====
- Gary Wetzel

===== Declined =====
- Kevin Crawford, former mayor of Manitowoc
- Jessica King, former state senator
- Justin Nickels, Mayor of Manitowoc

==== Primary results ====
Democratic primary results
Party	Candidate	Votes	%
Democratic	Mark Harris	19,714	99.8
Democratic	Write-ins	49	0.2
Total votes		19,763	100.0

The general election featured Gus Fahrendorf, of Neenah, as the nominee of the Libertarian Party.

=== General election ===
==== Campaign ====
Despite winning the primary, Petri refused to endorse Grothman, going as far as saying that Democratic nominee Mark Harris had done "a fine job" as County Executive.

Grothman declined to participate in any debates during the general election and turned down all requests for interviews.

==== Endorsements ====
Glenn Grothman (R)

Organizations

- Eagle Forum
- National Republican Congressional Committee "Young Guns" Program
- National Rifle Association - Political Victory Fund
- National Right to Life Committee
Mark Harris (D)

Labor unions

- AFL-CIO
- International Brotherhood of Boilermakers

==== Polling ====
Poll source	Date(s) administered	Sample size	Margin of error	Glenn Grothman (R)	Mark Harris (D)	Gus Fahrendorf (I)	Undecided
New York Times/CBS News Battleground Tracker	October 16–23, 2014	380	± 8.0%	49%	33%	1%	18%

==== Predictions ====
Source	Ranking	As of
The Cook Political Report	Likely R	November 3, 2014
Rothenberg	Safe R	October 24, 2014
Sabato's Crystal Ball	Safe R	October 30, 2014
RCP	Likely R	November 2, 2014
Daily Kos Elections	Likely R	November 4, 2014

==== Results ====
Wisconsin's 6th congressional district, 2014
Party	Candidate	Votes	%
Republican	Glenn Grothman	169,767	56.8
Democratic	Mark Harris	122,212	40.9
Independent	Gus Fahrendorf	6,865	2.3
n/a	Write-ins	189	0.0
Total votes		299,033	100.0
Republican hold			

== District 7 ==
2014 Wisconsin's 7th congressional district election
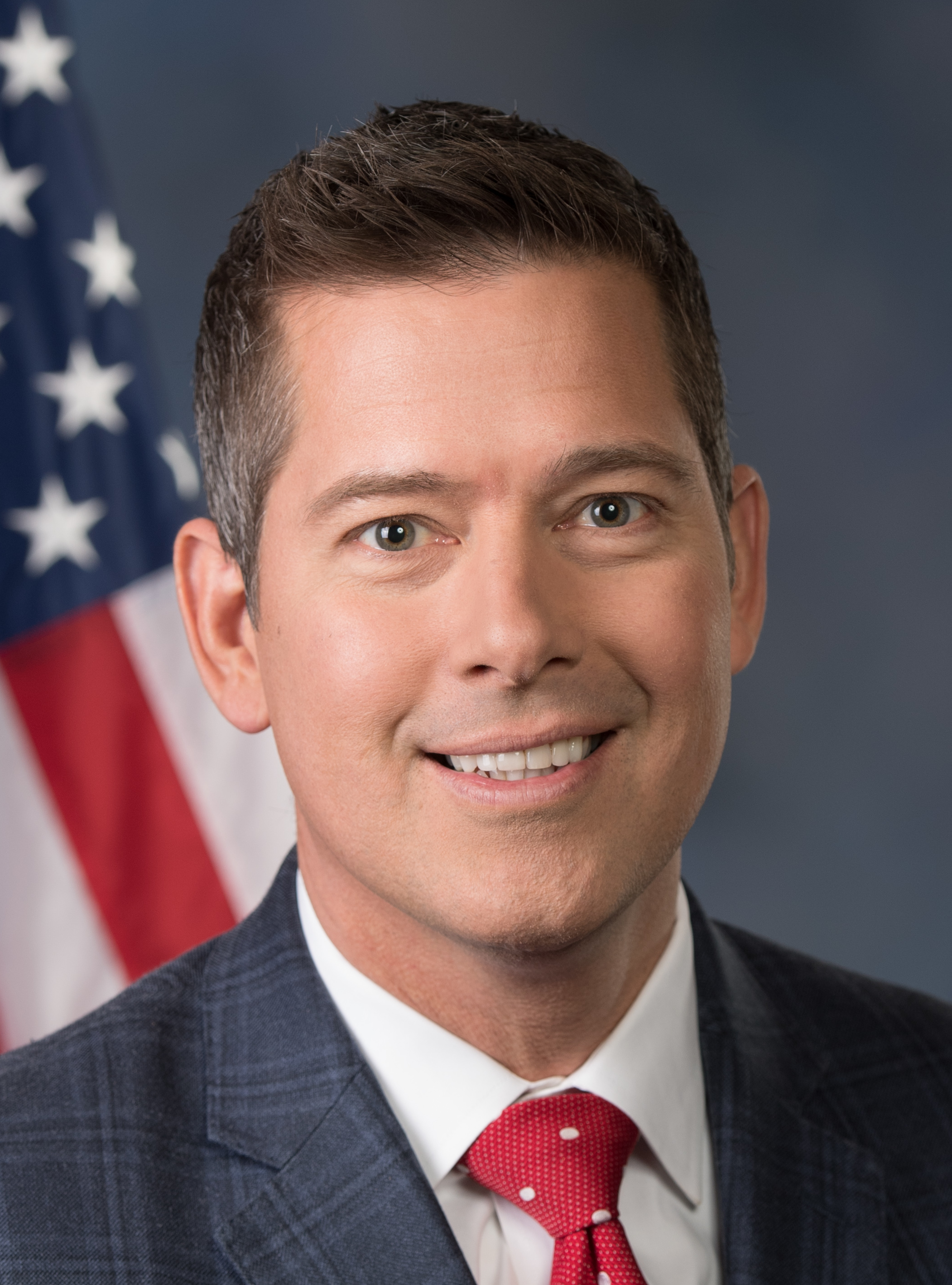

Nominee	Sean Duffy	Kelly Westlund
Party	Republican	Democratic
Popular vote	169,891	112,949
Percentage	59.3%	39.4%
- Precinct results Duffy: 40–50% 50–60% 60–70% 70–80% 80–90% >90% Westlund: 40–50% 50–60% 60–70% 70–80% 80–90% >90% Tie: 40–50% 50% No votes
U.S. Representative before election
Sean Duffy
Republican
Elected U.S. Representative
Sean Duffy
Republican

Republican incumbent Sean Duffy, who had represented the 7th district since 2011, ran for re-election.

=== Republican primary ===
==== Candidates ====
===== Nominee =====
- Sean Duffy, incumbent U.S. Representative

===== Eliminated in primary =====
- Don Raihala, real estate broker

==== Primary results ====
Republican primary results
Party	Candidate	Votes	%
Republican	Sean Duffy (incumbent)	25,707	87.6
Republican	Don Raihala	3,607	12.3
Republican	Write-ins	22	0.1
Total votes		29,336	100.0

=== Democratic primary ===
==== Candidates ====
===== Nominee =====
- Kelly Westlund, Ashland businesswoman and City Council member

===== Eliminated in primary =====
- Mike Krsiean

==== Primary results ====
Democratic primary results
Party	Candidate	Votes	%
Democratic	Kelly Westlund	18,631	77.9
Democratic	Mike Krsiean	5,256	22.0
Democratic	Write-ins	24	0.1
Total votes		23,911	100.0

=== General election ===
==== Endorsements ====
Sean Duffy (R)

Organizations

- National Rifle Association - Political Victory Fund
- National Right to Life Committee
Kelly Westlund (D)

Labor unions

- AFL-CIO
- International Brotherhood of Boilermakers

Organizations

- EMILY's List
- People for the American Way
- Progressive Change Campaign Committee
- Progressive Democrats of America
- Sierra Club

==== Polling ====
Poll source	Date(s) administered	Sample size	Margin of error	Sean Duffy (R)	Kelly Westlund (D)	Undecided
New York Times/CBS News Battleground Tracker	October 16–23, 2014	464	± 6.0%	56%	33%	10%

==== Predictions ====
Source	Ranking	As of
The Cook Political Report	Safe R	November 3, 2014
Rothenberg	Safe R	October 24, 2014
Sabato's Crystal Ball	Safe R	October 30, 2014
RCP	Likely R	November 2, 2014
Daily Kos Elections	Safe R	November 4, 2014

==== Results ====
Wisconsin's 7th congressional district, 2014
Party	Candidate	Votes	%
Republican	Sean Duffy (incumbent)	169,891	59.3
Democratic	Kelly Westlund	112,949	39.4
Independent	Lawrence Dale	3,686	1.3
n/a	Write-ins	77	0.0
Total votes		286,603	100.0
Republican hold			

== District 8 ==
2014 Wisconsin's 8th congressional district election
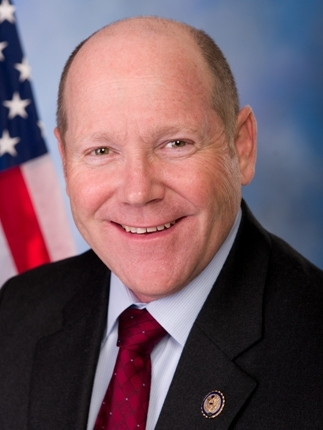

Nominee	Reid Ribble	Ron Gruett
Party	Republican	Democratic
Popular vote	188,553	101,345
Percentage	65.0%	34.9%
- Precinct results Ribble: 40–50% 50–60% 60–70% 70–80% 80–90% >90% Gruett: 50–60% 60–70% 70–80% >90% Tie: 50% No votes
U.S. Representative before election
Reid Ribble
Republican
Elected U.S. Representative
Reid Ribble
Republican

Republican incumbent Reid Ribble, who had represented the 8th district since 2011, ran for re-election.

=== Republican primary ===
==== Candidates ====
===== Nominee =====
- Reid Ribble, incumbent U.S. Representative

==== Primary results ====
Republican primary results
Party	Candidate	Votes	%
Republican	Reid Ribble (incumbent)	33,330	99.8
No party	Scattering	85	0.2
Total votes		33,415	100.0

=== Democratic primary ===
==== Candidates ====
===== Nominee =====
- Ron Gruett (pronounced 'grit'), professor of physics and chemistry

==== Primary results ====
Democratic primary results
Party	Candidate	Votes	%
Democratic	Ron Gruett	18,030	99.8
Democratic	Write-ins	34	0.2
Total votes		18,064	100.0

=== General election ===
==== Endorsements ====
Reid Ribble (R)

Organizations

- National Federation of Independent Business
- National Rifle Association - Political Victory Fund
- National Right to Life Committee
- No Labels
Ron Gruett (D)

Labor unions

- AFL-CIO
- International Brotherhood of Boilermakers

Organizations

- National Organization for Women

==== Polling ====
Poll source	Date(s) administered	Sample size	Margin of error	Reid Ribble (R)	Ron Gruett (D)	Undecided
New York Times/CBS News Battleground Tracker	October 16–23, 2014	354	± 8.0%	54%	34%	12%

==== Predictions ====
Source	Ranking	As of
The Cook Political Report	Safe R	November 3, 2014
Rothenberg	Safe R	October 24, 2014
Sabato's Crystal Ball	Safe R	October 30, 2014
RCP	Safe R	November 2, 2014
Daily Kos Elections	Safe R	November 4, 2014

==== Results ====
Wisconsin's 8th congressional district, 2014
Party	Candidate	Votes	%
Republican	Reid Ribble (incumbent)	188,553	65.0
Democratic	Ron Gruett	101,345	34.9
n/a	Write-ins	150	0.1
Total votes		290,048	100.0
Republican hold			

== See also ==
- 2014 United States House of Representatives elections
- 2014 United States elections
