= Sirius (2013 film) =

2013 American documentary film

- Theatrical release poster
- Directed by: Amardeep Kaleka
- Produced by: Bruce Alderman; Jeffrey Becker; Jared Bonshire; Adriano Bussandri; Christopher Crescitelli; Jorge Guillén; Melissa Guillén; Amardeep Kaleka; J.D. Seraphine; Clark Willison
- Narrated by: Thomas Jane
- Cinematography: Ramy Romany
- Edited by: Laurie Knapp
- Music by: Todd Richards; Peter Kater
- Production company: Neverending Light Productions
- Release date: April 22, 2013
- Running time: 110 minutes
- Country: United States
- Language: English

Sirius is a 2013 documentary directed by Amardeep Kaleka, based upon ufologist Steven M. Greer's book Hidden Truth, Forbidden Knowledge. Partially funded by a successful Kickstarter campaign, the film is narrated by Thomas Jane and follows Greer's efforts to reveal what he claims is information about top secret energy projects and propulsion techniques.

Sirius features interviews from former officials from the government and military, as well as images and a DNA analysis of the 6-inch (15 cm) skeleton known as Ata that was found in the Atacama Desert in northern Chile in 2003. The film premiered on April 22, 2013 in Los Angeles, California, as well as online.

== Reception ==
Critical reception was mostly negative. The Hollywood Reporter criticized the film: "Kaleka is so undiscerning in his choice of interviewees and so scattershot in his presentation that potentially credible subjects look nutso by association, and no sighting anecdote generates enough narrative momentum to dent a viewer's skepticism." The Village Voice also gave a predominantly negative review, expressing frustration over the film not living up to its potential.
