= Lloyd Pye =

American novelist

- Born: September 7, 1946; Houma, Louisiana
- Died: December 9, 2013 (aged 67); Destin, Florida
- Education: Tulane University
- Occupations: Author and paranormal researcher
- Writing career
- Subject: Promotion of the Starchild skull
- Notable works: That Prosser Kid, Mismatch

Lloyd Anthony Pye Jr. (September 7, 1946 – December 9, 2013) was an American author and paranormal researcher best known for his promotion of the Starchild skull. He claimed it was the relic of a human-alien hybrid, although genetic testing showed it to be from a human male. He also promoted the ideas that cryptozoological creatures such as Bigfoot are real and that aliens intervened in human development.

== Writing ==
Pye's first book That Prosser Kid (1977), a fictional account of college football, was said to have "achieved considerable recognition" by the Continuum Encyclopedia of American Literature, and was called "lively but unoriginal" by The Boston Globe. It received negative reviews in The New York Times Book Review and the Los Angeles Times. His 1988 book Mismatch was called a "novel that ought to go on your must read list" by Deseret News.

Pye also gave lectures and made television appearances in support of his ideas on The Learning Channel, National Geographic Channel, Extra, Animal Planet, and Richard & Judy in the United Kingdom. Pye stated that he believed Bigfoot to exist, as well as the similar Mongolian cryptid the Almas.

In the 1980s, Pye wrote for television shows, including Scarecrow and Mrs. King and Magnum, P.I..

== The Starchild skull ==
In the late 1990s, Pye obtained a curiously shaped skull from a couple in El Paso, Texas, that he believed was an alien-human hybrid. DNA tests show that the skull is from a human male. American clinical neurologist Steven Novella has said the skull belongs to a child who suffered from hydrocephalus.

In 2009, Pye took a replica of the skull on a lecture tour of Europe, including an appearance at the Leeds Exopolitics Expo.

== Personal life ==
Pye was born in Houma, Louisiana, to Lloyd A. Pye Sr., an optometrist (c.1922–2007), and Nina Jo Pye (née Boyles); Lloyd Pye had two brothers and a sister. He earned a football scholarship to Tulane University in New Orleans as a Running back/Punter from 1964 to 1968. He was the Tulane Green Wave football team's leading punter 1967–1968. He later lived in Pensacola, Florida.

== Death ==
In 2013, Pye was diagnosed with lymphoma and retired from active research and promotion of the starchild skull. Lloyd Pye died December 9, 2013, at his home in Destin, Florida.

== Bibliography ==
- That Prosser Kid (fiction, Arbor House, 1977, ISBN 0877951659) about a redshirted college football player, republished as A Darker Shade of Red (2007, Bell Lap Books)
- Mismatch, (fiction, Dell, 1988), about computer hacking and warfare. ISBN 9780595126149
- Everything You Know is Wrong – Book One: Human Evolution (Adamu, 1998) ISBN 9780966013412
- The Starchild Skull: Genetic Enigma or Human-Alien Hybrid? (Bell Lap Books, 2007) ISBN 0979388147
- Starchild Skull Essentials (ebook, 2011)
- Intervention Theory Essentials (ebook, 2011)
