= Gun laws in Wisconsin =

Location of Wisconsin in the United States

Gun laws in Wisconsin regulate the sale, possession, and use of firearms and ammunition in the U.S. state of Wisconsin.

== Summary table ==
| Subject / law | Long guns | Handguns | Relevant statutes | Notes |
|---|---|---|---|---|
| State permit required to purchase? | No | No | Wis. Stat. § 175.35 | A purchaser is prohibited from receiving a handgun from a FFL dealer until they’ve been approved through the state de-facto permitting scheme which is to pay a State background check fee to the state DOJ for it to conduct an additional background check (over and above the Federal 4473). |
| Firearm registration? | No | No | | |
| Assault weapon law? | No | No | | |
| Magazine capacity restriction? | No | No | | |
| Owner license required? | No | No | | |
| Permit required for concealed carry? | N/A | Yes | Wis. Stat. § 175.60; Wis. Stat. § 941.23 | Wisconsin is a "shall issue" state for citizens and lawful permanent residents who are 21 years or older. |
| Permit required for open carry? | No | No | Wis. Stat. § 947.01 | May carry openly without permit. |
| Castle Doctrine/Stand Your Ground law? | Yes | Yes | Wis. Stat. § 895.62; Wis. Stat. § 939.48 | |
| State preemption of local restrictions? | Yes | Yes | Wis. Stat. § 66.0409 | |
| NFA weapons restricted? | No | No | Wis. Stat. § 941.27 | Machine guns may not shoot pistol cartridges and may not be possessed aggressively or offensively. |
| Peaceable Journey laws? | No | No | Wis. Stat. § 167.31 | |
| Background checks required for private sales? | No | No | | |

== Constitutional protection ==
The Constitution of Wisconsin protects the right to bear arms in Article 1, Section 25 – "The people have the right to keep and bear arms for security, defense, hunting, recreation or any other lawful purpose."

== Preemption ==
Wisconsin has state preemption laws which generally forbid cities from passing firearms or knife ordinances stricter than that of state law. Localities may impose a sales or use tax, and may restrict the discharge of firearms (except for self-defense).

On March 8, 2017, the Wisconsin Supreme Court ruled that Madison's Metro Transit rule forbidding firearms on public buses violated the state's preemption law, and that people who are lawfully carrying arms must be allowed to carry on public buses.

== Concealed carry ==
Wisconsin is a shall-issue state for concealed carry licensing. As of November 1, 2011, Wisconsin residents may apply for a concealed carry license through the Wisconsin Department of Justice. The law allows Wisconsin to become the 49th state in the Union to make some provision for the concealed carry of firearms by normal citizens.

== Open carry ==
Open carry is legal without a permit anywhere concealed carry is legal. It is legal for all adults unless they are prohibited from possession of firearms. Wisconsin state law 948.60(2)(a) states: "Any person under 18 years of age who possesses or goes armed with a dangerous weapon is guilty of a Class A misdemeanor." However, the exceptions are: “when a person under 18 possesses a rifle or shotgun” and "when the dangerous weapon is being used in target practice under the supervision of an adult or in a course of instruction in the traditional and proper use of the dangerous weapon under the supervision of an adult." Wisconsin statute 948.60(3)(c) states: "This section applies only to a person under 18 years of age who possesses or is armed with a rifle or a shotgun if the person is in violation of s. 941.28 or is not in compliance with ss. 29.304 and 29.593." Statute 29.304(3)(b) states: "No person 14 years of age or older but under 16 years of age may have in his or her possession or control any firearm" with added exceptions listed. Children over 12 and under 16 are allowed to use rifles and shotguns under very limited, supervised situations. A license for adults is not required unless in a taxpayer-owned building or within 1000 feet of school property and not on private property.

In the past, some jurisdictions have tried to prosecute open-carry by equating the open carry of handguns with disorderly conduct. On April 20, 2009, the Wisconsin Attorney General's office released a memorandum to all law enforcement agencies stating that mere open carry of a firearm was not disorderly conduct, and instructed both law enforcement and the district attorneys to cease this practice.

In 2011 a subsection was added to the Disorderly Conduct statute (947.01) reading "Unless other facts and circumstances that indicate a criminal or malicious intent on the part of the person apply, a person is not in violation of, and may not be charged with a violation of, this section for loading, carrying, or going armed with a firearm, without regard to whether the firearm is loaded or is concealed or openly carried." This codified open carry, ending any debate as to its legality.

Loading, or having a loaded, uncased handgun inside a vehicle was legalized beginning November 1, 2011. The firearm must not be "hidden from ordinary observation" while inside the vehicle unless the citizen has a license. However, the Wisconsin Supreme Court ruled that a license is required to have a concealed loaded handgun within reach in a vehicle, regardless of the Safe Transport Statute removing restrictions on transporting loaded handguns.

== Castle doctrine ==
On December 7, 2011, Governor Scott Walker signed a bill passing a castle doctrine for Wisconsin. The bill provides criminal immunity (WI statute 939.48(1m)) and protection from civil suits (WI statute 895.62) for homeowners or business owners who use a gun in self-defense while on their property, with the presumption that any action is justified. The law is a "stand your ground" law, which does not contain a duty to retreat. This applies at the user's private vehicle, business, and at their home. Protection extends to improvements only (driveway, sidewalk, patio, fence, garage, house...), not bare ground. Also, the criminal must have forcibly entered, or be in the process of attempting to forcibly enter, and the defender must be present in the home, car, or business. The Washington County DA ruled that opening a door counts as forcible entry.

The law does not apply if force is used against police while in the line of duty if the shooter knows or should have known that the victim was a police officer or other public safety worker. (WI statute 895.62(4)(b)) The law also does not protect those who are engaged in criminal activity. (WI statute 939.48(1m)(b)(1))

== No duty to inform ==
Wisconsin is not a "must notify" state. If an officer is "acting in an official capacity and with lawful authority", and the citizen is carrying a concealed weapon, the citizen must show both a carry license and photographic identification only upon demand.

WI statute 175.60(2g)(c)

== Guns in vehicles ==
The Wisconsin Supreme Court ruled that a license is required to have a concealed loaded handgun within reach in a vehicle, regardless of the Safe Transport Statue removing restrictions on transporting loaded handguns.

Beginning November 1, 2011, it is legal to load a handgun, or to transport a loaded handgun cased or uncased, in a vehicle without a license. NOTE: This does NOT apply to long guns; they still must be unloaded, but now may be uncased. There is still some confusion as to whether or not an encased gun is concealed, so if it is cased, best practice is to keep the long gun out of reach. Long guns must be "discernable to ordinary observation", since a conceal carry license does not apply. Previously all firearms had to be unloaded and encased (per the transport statute), and out of reach (derived from the concealed carry statute). Those with a concealed carry license may conceal a pistol in a vehicle.

WI statute 167.31

=== Boats ===
Pistols may be carried openly without a license, or concealed with a license. Long guns must be unloaded while the motor is running; they are not required to be encased, but must be in plain sight.

=== Aircraft ===
Firearms are prohibited on commercial aircraft except in checked baggage.

Carry is legal on a private aircraft. With a license a user may carry openly or concealed. Without a license, only open carry is legal.

=== Exceptions ===
Exceptions to carrying concealed include anyone on their own property, on-duty law enforcement officers, military personnel on active duty, landowners and their family and employees on farm tractors inside CWD eradication zones, and disabled hunters with special permits meeting all the requirements.

== Buying and selling ==
Private sales are legal. No background check or governmental permission / registration are necessary. A sales receipt is recommended in case the buyer needs to prove ownership (as when retrieving firearms which have been confiscated by police).

As of July 24, 2015, there is no longer a 48-hour waiting period on handgun purchases from an FFL (Federal Firearms License) (does not apply to private sales). However, a purchaser is prohibited from receiving a handgun from a FFL dealer until they've paid a permitting fee and the state DOJ conducts an additional background check (over and above the Federal 4473). The background check and the release of the handgun to the purchaser may take up to five days as per Wisconsin s.175.35.

WI statute 175.35

Rifles and shotguns can be purchased in another state as long as the purchase complies with Federal law and the laws of both states. There is no longer a requirement that the other state be contiguous.

WI statute 175.30

== Title II firearms ==
Machine guns (fully automatic firearms) are legal if the firearm is registered with the Bureau of Alcohol, Tobacco, Firearms & Explosives (BATFE), and the owner has received permission from the local sheriff or chief of police (941.26), and the weapon is not adapted to use pistol cartridges for a purpose manifestly not aggressive or offensive (941.26(5)) or is exempted per statute 941.27.

Short-barrel rifles and shotguns are legal if they are registered with ATF, state statute 941.28

Suppressors are legal if they are registered with ATF, statute 941.298

== State parks, fish hatcheries, and wildlife refuges ==
Statute 29.091 and 29.089 once required firearms to be encased and unloaded in state wildlife refuges and fish hatcheries. Those who have a concealed carry permit were not subject to these restrictions on handguns.

As of January 2013, anyone who is legal to possess a firearm may openly carry a pistol in a state park without a license. (The law once stated that to possess in a state park, one must be a licensee. That law was removed.) The restriction still applies to fish hatcheries and long guns, and in order to enter a taxpayer-owned building anywhere (including a park) one must be a licensee.

== Other laws ==
Possession of a firearm while intoxicated, or "materially impaired", shooting within 100 yards of a home without permission, pointing a weapon at anyone except in self-defense, and negligent handling of a weapon are all crimes.

Carrying a concealed weapon without a valid license is a class A misdemeanor. This is any "weapon", not just firearms. This restriction does not apply in one's own home or business. A concealed carry license only covers handguns, tasers, billy clubs, and knives.

WI statute 941.23

Carrying a handgun without a concealed carry license where alcohol is sold AND consumed (the class B establishment – a "tavern", a place which sells alcohol for on-premises consumption) is generally a class A misdemeanor unless you have permission from the owner, manager, or agent of the establishment.

Exceptions are having a license, and that the owner or manager of can give permission for someone (without a license) to carry openly. When carrying (openly or concealed) on a license, alcohol may not be consumed on the premises. When carrying openly with permission of the owner or manager, it is legal to consume alcohol as long as you do not become "materially impaired". It is legal to carry a handgun into a store that sells alcohol for the express purpose of being consumed elsewhere (a liquor or grocery store).

WI statute 941.237

Armor-piercing ammunition when committing a crime upgrades the crime to a Class H felony.

WI statute 941.296

"No person may carry or display a facsimile firearm in a manner that could reasonably be expected to alarm, intimidate, threaten or terrify another person", unless on your own property or business, or that of another person with their consent.

WI statute 941.2965

Committing a crime while possessing a dangerous weapon is a penalty enhancer.

WI statute 939.63

It is a felony to possess a firearm if one:

- Has been convicted of a felony
- Adjudicated delinquent for an act committed on or after April 21, 1994, that if committed by an adult would be a felony
- Has been found not guilty of a felony by reason of mental disease or defect
- Has been committed under mental health laws and ordered not to possess a firearm
- Is the subject of a restraining order
- Is ordered not to possess firearms as a subject of a restraining order or as a condition of bond or parole

Any person who knowingly provides a firearm to a prohibited person is party to a felony crime.

It is a class I felony to possess a firearm on school grounds.

This statute does not apply to:

- unloaded and encased firearms
- individuals with firearms for use in a school-approved program
- individuals with school contract to possess firearm
- on-duty law enforcement acting in official capacity
- off-duty officers or retired law enforcement who maintain their certification per Federal Law HR218.
- unloaded firearms when traversing school grounds to gain access to hunting land, if the entry is approved by the school.

It is a forfeiture (fine) to possess a usable firearm on public property within 1000 feet of a school unless the carrier is a licensee. (If the gun is unloaded and encased, it is not a crime.) Wisconsin only issues resident licenses, and the ATF has interpreted federal law to mean that only licenses issued by the state in which the school is located are sufficient to void the "gun-free" school zone.

It is a class G felony to discharge or attempt to discharge a firearm in a school zone. Exceptions for self-defense, private property not part of school grounds, school programs, and on-duty law enforcement.

Some counties have adopted Second Amendment sanctuary resolutions.

== Firearms and minors ==
Leaving a firearm within reach of a child under 14 is generally a misdemeanor if that child points it at anyone, harms anyone, or shows it to anyone in a public place. Defenses include having the gun locked in a gun safe or container, having it holstered on their person, having a trigger lock on the gun, removal of a key operating part, illegal entry by anyone to obtain the firearm, or a reasonable belief a juvenile could not access the firearm. WI statute 948.55

Firearms retailers are required to provide every buyer with a written warning stating, "If you leave a loaded firearm within the reach or easy access of a child, you may be fined or imprisoned or both if the child improperly discharges, possesses or exhibits the firearm." WI statute 175.37

Upon the retail commercial sale or retail commercial transfer of any firearm, the seller or transferor shall provide to the buyer or transferee the following written warning in block letters not less than one-fourth inch in height: “IF YOU LEAVE A LOADED FIREARM WITHIN THE REACH OR EASY ACCESS OF A CHILD YOU MAY BE FINED OR IMPRISONED OR BOTH IF THE CHILD IMPROPERLY DISCHARGES, POSSESSES OR EXHIBITS THE FIREARM." (2) Any person who violates sub. (1) may be fined not more than $500 or imprisoned for not more than 30 days or both. WI statute 948.60

Defenses to prosecution under this statute:

- Target practice under the supervision of an adult
- Members of armed forces or police under 18 in the line of duty
- Hunting (either with an adult or having passed hunter's safety)
- No person 14 years of age or older but under 16 years of age, not in violation of laws on short-barreled rifles or shotguns, and was in compliance with regulations on hunting, if hunting.

For hunting purposes, the following exceptions to the age limit apply, as specified in statute 29.304 for shotguns with barrels 12" or longer and rifles with barrels 16" or longer.

- Under 10 may hunt with a firearm or a bow under Wisconsin Mentored Hunting Law passed into law in Act 62 in 2017
- Under 10 can only possess firearm/bow in Hunter Safety class, or while cased/unloaded and under adult supervision while going to/from Hunter Safety class, or while under adult supervision while at a target range.
- Anyone of any age may hunt when accompanied by an adult (within arms reach), both must be licensed, only one firearm/bow between the adult and mentor (no hunter safety course requirement for the mentored hunter).
- 12–13 may hunt when accompanied by an adult and the child has successfully completed a Hunter Safety class.
- 12–13 may possess firearm when accompanied by an adult, or while transporting cased/unloaded firearm to/from Hunter Safety class, or in Hunter Safety class.
- 14–16 is the same as 12–13, except Hunter Safety graduates can hunt and possess firearms (rifles/shotguns) without adult supervision.

School students shall be suspended until their expulsion hearing if they possess a firearm in school or during a school event (except if the student is participating in a Hunter Safety class). State law requires a minimum one-year expulsion for this offense. Statute 120.13(1)(bm) and 120.13(1)(c)2m. In addition, the student's driver's license may be suspended for two years under Statute 938.34(14q). This suspension also applies to students who make bomb threats or having CCW violations in taxpayer-owned buildings. § The age range has changed for minors. Link included to Wisconsin statute.

== School zones ==
“School” means a public, parochial or private school which provides an educational program for one or more grades between grades 1 and 12 and which is commonly known as an elementary school, middle school, junior high school, senior high school or high school.

“School zone” means any of the following: 1. In or on the grounds of a school. 2. Within 1000' from the grounds of a school.

WI statute 948.605(1)(c)

Any individual who knowingly possesses a firearm at a place that the individual knows, or has reasonable cause to believe, is in or on the grounds of a school is guilty of a Class I felony unless one of the exemptions applies.

WI statute 948.605(2)(a)

Possession in the 1000' zone is a forfeiture (ticket), unless an exception applies. The most common of those are: private property, licensee, unloaded and encased.

WI statute 948.605(2)(b) references 18USC922(q)(2)(b) (i), (iv), (v), (vi), & (vii).

== Additional Wisconsin laws table ==
| Subject | Long Gun | Handgun | Reference | Remarks |
| Permit required to purchase a firearm? | No | No | | |
| Permit required to open carry? | No | No | 175.60(2)(c) | |
| Permit required to conceal carry? | Yes | Yes | 175.60(2g)(a) | |
| Are permits issued to non-residents? | | No | 175.60(3)(f) | No, but active duty military assigned within WI may apply with their assignment orders. |
| What is the permit cost? | | | | $40 New $22 Renewal |
| How long is permit processing time? | | | 175.60(9)(b) | Within 21 Days |
| How many years is the permit valid? | | | 175.60(15)(a) | 5 years |
| Firearm registration required? | No | No | 175.35(2k)(ar)2. | If the transfer is cleared by the WI DOJ the department shall destroy all records regarding that firearms restrictions record search within 30 days after receiving the notification form. |
| State requirement to issue permit? | | Yes | 175.60(2)(a) | Shall issue |
| Castle doctrine? | Yes | Yes | 939.48(1m)(ar)1 | No requirement to retreat in home or place of residence, business or vehicle. |
| Stand Your Ground law? | No | No | | WI law does not address this outside of the "castle doctrine." However, jury instruction can include consideration of the opportunity to retreat. |
| Required to carry CCW permit and ID while concealed carrying? | Yes | Yes | 175.60(2g)(b)1 175.60(2g)(b)2 | WI statute defines photographic ID as an operator's (driver's) license or a state-issued identification card. |
| Must you inform an officer that you are carrying upon contact? | No | No | 175.60(2g)(c) | |
| Does the permit cover weapons other than firearms? | - | - | 175.60(1)(j) | Yes. Electric weapons & "billy clubs" are included. |
| Can you carry in restaurants that serve alcohol? | | Yes | 941.237(3)(cx) | Yes, but you may not consume alcohol. |
| Carrying on snowmobiles and ATVs | Yes | Yes | | Long guns must be unloaded when in or on a vehicle, but no longer need to be cased. Handguns may be carried loaded and uncased without a permit if on your own property. If NOT on your own property you must have a permit to carry concealed. |
| State preemption of local restrictions? | Yes | Yes | 66.0409(2) | No political subdivision may enact or enforce an ordinance or adopt a resolution that regulates the sale, purchase..., ownership, use, keeping, possession, bearing, ... of any firearm..., unless the ordinance or resolution is the same as or similar to, and no more stringent than, a state statute. However, 943.13 does allow private owners and government entities to restrict carry on their properties. |
| Assault Weapons law? | No | No | | |
| Magazine capacity restriction? | No | No | | |
| Owner license required | No | No | | |
| National Firearms Act (NFA) Restrictions? | Yes | Yes | 941.26 941.298 | |
| Background checks required for private sales? | No | No | | |
| Does this state recognize other state's carry permits? | | Yes | 175.60(1)(f) | Wisconsin recognizes other states based on their qualification requirements, primarily background checks. WI DOJ is designated to maintain a list of states with which WI maintains reciprocity. |
| Do private business "No Guns Allowed" signs have force of law? | | Yes | 175.60(17)(b) 943.13(2)(bm) | |
Can you carry a firearm at this place based on Wisconsin statutes?
| Schools & school grounds | No | No/Yes | 948.605(2) | School means public, private, parochial or tribal, 1st through 12th grade. NO when IN school building or on the grounds. Very limited exceptions. (Class I Felony) YES within 1,000 feet of the school grounds (not ON grounds) IF in possession of the CCW license. (Class B Forfeiture) |
| Law enforcement stations/offices (Police, Sheriff, State Patrol, etc.) | No | No | 175.60(16)(a)1. | No licensee may knowingly carry a weapon, openly or concealed, or a firearm that is not a weapon, in any of these places. (Class C Misdemeanor) |
| Prisons, jails, houses of correction, etc. | No | No | 175.60(16)(a)2. | |
| Secure mental health facilities | No | No | 175.60(16)(a)5. | |
| Federal, state, county courthouses & municipal courtrooms when court in session | No | No | 175.60(16)(a)6.&7. | |
| Beyond TSA security checkpoints in airports (State offense vs Federal) | No | No | 175.60(16)(a)8. | |
| Trespass to Land (includes residences, businesses, government buildings, universities & colleges, churches, special events (State Fair, Summerfest, etc.), grounds/land (if separately posted)) | No | No | 943.13(2)(bm)2. | No person may enter or remain on any land (includes structures) of another after having been notified by the owner, occupant, manager or organizer not to enter or remain on the premises when in possession of a weapon. A person has received notice from the owner or occupant if he or she has been notified personally, either orally or in writing, or if the property is posted. Property is considered to be posted with a sign that states a restriction imposed, that is at least 5 inches by 7 inches. No specific verbiage or graphics are specified in WI statute. (Class I Misdemeanor) |
| Parking Lots | Yes* | Yes | 175.60(16)(b)1. | The prohibitions listed in this section do not apply to a weapon in a vehicle driven or parked in a parking facility. (*Long guns must be unloaded.) HOWEVER, this parking lot exception does NOT apply to FEDERAL facilities. |
Can you carry a firearm at this place based on federal law?
| Post offices | No | No | 39 C.F.R. § 232.1(l) | This includes the parking lot and the facility |
| Any federal facility | No | No | 18 USC § 930 | This means a building or any part of one whether owned or leased by the Federal Government where Federal employees are regularly present for the purpose of performing their official duties |
| IRS offices | No | No | 18 USC § 930 | See above |
| Federal court houses | No | No | 18 USC § 930 | See above |
| Ranger stations | No | No | 18 USC § 930 | See above |
| Federal buildings in federal parks | No | No | 18 USC § 930 | See above |
| Airports behind the secure area | No | No | 18 USC § 930 | Wisconsin has its own state statute covering this, as well. See above. |
