= Siân Halcrow =

New Zealander biological anthropologist

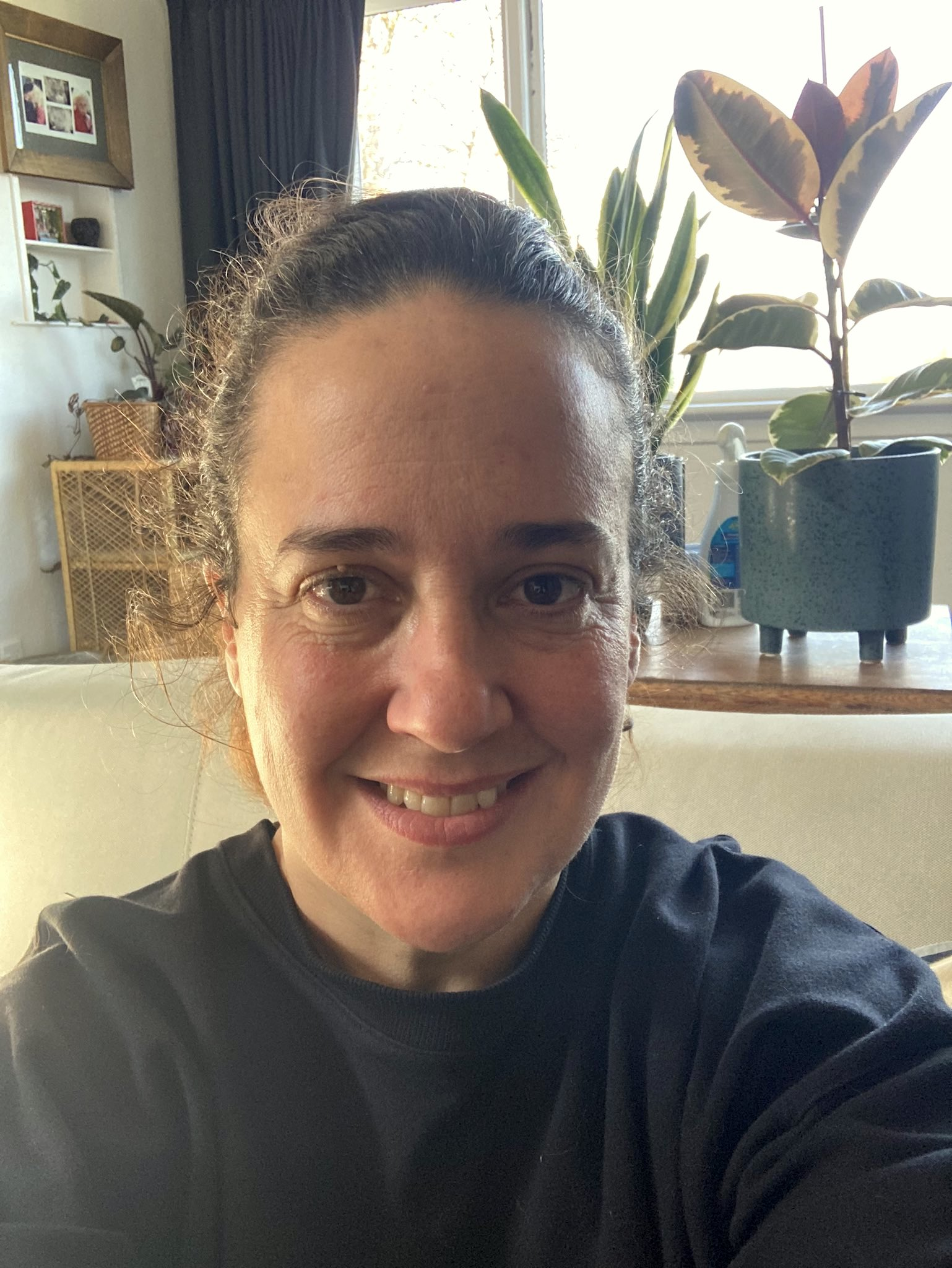
- Born: Siân Ellen Halcrow

Academic background
- Education: University of Otago
- Thesis: Subadult health and disease in late prehistoric mainland Southeast Asia (2006)

Academic work
- Discipline: Biological anthropology
- Institutions: University of Otago

Siân Ellen Halcrow is a New Zealand academic in the field of biological anthropology, specialising in infant and child health and disease in the past populations. She is a professor in the department of anatomy at the University of Otago.

== Academic career ==
Halcrow began a Bachelor of Arts (Honours) degree in anthropology at the University of Auckland and transferred to the University of Otago for her third year and honours year.

Halcrow completed a PhD at the University of Otago in 2006; her thesis was titled Subadult health and disease in late prehistoric mainland Southeast Asia. In 2010, she was appointed to a lecturing position at the University of Otago.

She has led and worked on archaeological projects studying human remains, specifically children and infants, in Thailand, Laos, Cambodia, Indonesia, China, Chile and New Zealand. This area of study helps to understand major human transitions such as the intensification of agriculture, and Halcrow uses this as a way to explore the ethics of the study and preservation of human remains in Aotearoa New Zealand and other parts of the world.

Siân Halcrow manages a northeast Thailand skeletal collection from a late Iron Age site called Non Ban Jak, which shows the development of social complexity before the Kingdom of Angkor (also known as the Khmer Empire) was established. Halcrow takes these cultural opportunities to look at cross-cultural relationships and understandings between the living and the dead, which in turn represents the operation of society through different cultures.

Halcrow has contributed to many Otago University services such as the Division of Health Sciences Research Forum Organising Committee in 2012, the OSMS Māori Strategic Framework Group in 2015, and the Summer School and Continuing Education Board in 2019.

=== Awards and recognition ===
In 2018, Halcrow won the Hill Tinsley Medal from the New Zealand Association of Scientists. In the same year, she received the University of Otago's Rowheath Trust Award and Carl Smith Medal for outstanding scholarly achievement of researchers in the early stages of their careers. Halcrow has more than 100 peer-reviewed publications and since 2020 is Co-Editor-In-Chief for the global quarterly journal Bioarchaeology International.

== Selected works ==
- Gowland, R., & Halcrow, S. (Eds.). (2020). The mother-infant nexus in anthropology: Small beginnings, significant outcomes. Cham, Switzerland: Springer. doi: 10.1007/978-3-030-27393-4
- Snoddy, Anne Marie E.; Buckley, Hallie R.; Elliott, Gail E.; Standen, Vivien G.; Arriaza, Bernardo T.; Halcrow, Siân E. (2018). "Macroscopic features of scurvy in human skeletal remains: A literature synthesis and diagnostic guide". American Journal of Physical Anthropology. 167 (4): 876–895. doi:10.1002/ajpa.23699. ISSN 0002-9483. PMC 6282809. PMID 30298514.
- Halcrow, S.E., Tayles, N. "The Bioarchaeological Investigation of Childhood and Social Age: Problems and Prospects". Journal of Archaeological Method and Theory 15, 190–215 (2008). https://doi.org/10.1007/s10816-008-9052-x
