= Alyoshenka =

Putative premature baby corpse found in Russia in 1996

Alyoshenka (Russian: Алёшенька, diminutive of the Russian male first name Alexey) or the Kyshtym Dwarf is an infant whose unusual mummified remains were discovered in the village of Kaolinovy, near Kyshtym, Chelyabinsk Oblast, Russia in mid-1996. The remains were medically examined and identified by investigators as representing the body of a prematurely born female baby with various congenital anomalies, although some medical examiners disputed this initial determination. A DNA test was subsequently conducted that strongly supported the initial conclusion, but a minor amount of controversy lingered as the original corpse itself was unavailable for sampling, having since been lost. As such, only photos and videos survive. Alternate prosaic and paranormal explanations were variously proposed.

== Discovery ==
In mid-1996, 74-year-old Tamara Prosvirina, a resident of Kaolinovy near Kyshtym in Chelyabinsk Oblast, found a small mummified body while walking near the local cemetery and village well. She took the body home, believing it to be alive, and named it Alyoshenka.

Over the following days, Prosvirina cared for Alyoshenka as though it were a living infant. She reportedly tried to feed it and asked neighbours for medicine. Concerned that Prosvirina, who had a history of mental illness, was experiencing another psychiatric crisis, her neighbours contacted medical authorities. She was admitted to a psychiatric hospital for evaluation.

While Prosvirina was in hospital, the body remained in her home. Neighbours later turned it over to the local militsiya (police), who opened an official investigation.

== Description ==
The mummified remains measured slightly more than 20 cm (7.9 in) in length and were described as greyish-green, with yellowish spots on the torso. The child had a hairless head, large eyes that occupied much of the face, and unusually long forelimbs. No external ears, umbilical cord or genitalia were visible.

The skull lacked a lower jaw and had a smooth, helmet-like shape with a pronounced central ridge. Contemporary descriptions compared its overall shape to an unopened water-lily bud. It was also described as consisting of four cranial segments and differing markedly from that of a typical human infant.

== Examination ==
City Department of Internal Affairs investigator Major Vladimir Bendlin decided initially that these were the mummified remains of a child and took them to gynecologist Dr. Irina Yermolaeva for analysis. She stated that the remains were not a hoax in that they represented a genuine mummified body that once consisted of living tissue. Her conclusions were that the body was a miscarried or aborted fetus, and the deformities could be attributed to the far-reaching nuclear fallout of the 1957 Kyshtym Disaster.

Bendlin's clinical assistant, Lyubov Romanowa, who herself had seen many deformities in children, stated that "they had never seen anything like this" and that she believed that it was "not of human origin". She said the differences were just too many, not least of which was the number of bones on the head, four in total, that had sharp edges which were "completely different to a human being". Pathologist Dr. Stanislav Samoshkin also dissented from Yermolaeva's opinion due to the number of anomalies and suggested "perhaps this is an animal". He further called for DNA testing to reach a more conclusive result.

A doctor from the local hospital who had allegedly seen the corpse reported that it corresponded to a normal 20- to 25-week human fetus, born prematurely. It could have lived for several hours, but not several weeks, contrary to Prosvirina's claims.

== DNA analysis ==
In April 2004, scientists conducted DNA testing and made an official statement that the "Kyshtym creature" was a premature female human infant, with severe deformities. Though widely deemed conclusive, debate lingered due to the inability of the team to directly test the original corpse, which had since been lost.

A March 2018 study on the similar Atacama skeleton found an extremely high number of mutations for bone and muscle formation, suggesting that such major mutations, although extremely rare, are possible.

== Disappearance of the remains ==
Following the initial examination, Alyoshenka remained in police custody while investigators tried to determine its identity. Over the following months, the remains were transferred between investigators. By 2004, when DNA testing was carried out, Alyoshenka could no longer be located. Investigators instead examined preserved tissue samples.

Several explanations for the disappearance of the remains have been proposed. A local ufologist claimed that Alyoshenka had been taken away by extraterrestrials. Other accounts suggested that the remains had been acquired by a private collector. None of these claims has been verified.

In 1999, three years after Alyoshenka was discovered, Tamara Prosvirina died after being struck by a vehicle.

== See also ==
- Human–animal hybrid
- Kosmopoisk
