= Amar Kaleka =

Indian-American film director (born 1978)

Amar Singh Kaleka

Personal details
- Born: 12 July 1978 (age 48) Patiala, Punjab, India
- Children: 2
- Occupation: Filmmaker
- Website: www.neverendinglight.com

Amardeep Singh Kaleka (born 12 July 1978) is an Indian-American film director who won a regional Emmy Award for his direction of the short film Jacob's Turn in 2010 and another one for Esperanza (2014). Following his father's death in the Wisconsin Sikh temple shooting in 2012, Kaleka became involved in politics, supporting gun control, progressive economic reform, and the peace agenda. During the summer of 2014, he ran unsuccessfully in the Democratic primary for the United States House of Representatives in Wisconsin's 1st congressional district, losing to Rob Zerban.

== Biography ==
Kaleka was born in Patiala, Punjab. His family came to the United States when he was a child. In 1982, as dangerous tension began to mount in the area over the Khalistan movement, Amar's father, Satwant Singh Kaleka, decided to leave the country with his wife, Satpal, and their two young sons, Pardeep and Amardeep.

In 1982, at age 4, Kaleka and his family moved to Germantown, Wisconsin, to live with their paternal uncle, Dr. J.S. Kaleka. When the family realised their ability to survive in America was largely dictated by two people working, mother and father, they made a plan. Satpal, the mother, who was a simple farmer like her husband Satwant, was asked to learn English quickly despite her eighth grade education. In order to go to school full-time in the states, Satpal and Satwant made one of the largest sacrifices: their two sons. Amardeep aged 4 and Pardeep aged 6, returned to India by themselves to live at the Kaleka family household in the old city of Patiala with their maternal aunt, Dr. Jaswinder Kaur Kaleka, Ph.D.

After a year, Satpal passed her TOEFL Exam and found a union job at Eagle Knitting. Satwant also found a job, at a family run independent gas station, whereby he manned the register and filled the coolers. He did this for more than 12 hours a day to make sure there was enough money to build a life in America. When Satpal was done during each day at her factory union job, she would take the bus to Satwant to help out and give him a break.

When Amardeep and Pardeep came back to the United States for school, their family moved to the North West side of Milwaukee. This area had been termed "Little Beirut" by locals, and came complete with drive-by shootings, armed robberies, and a severe economic depression. Amar grew up very poor, having to accept food from "free lunch programs" while his parents rented apartments from government subsidized housing.

=== High school career – Bay View High School ===
Kaleka attended Bay View High School in the Bay View neighborhood of Milwaukee, Wisconsin, graduating in 1996. While he attended Bay View, he became the student government class president of 1996, as well as ranking ninth in chess in the state, founding the World Culture's Club, and playing varsity basketball, soccer, and baseball. He went on to become the Milwaukee High School Baseball Player of the Year, as he went undefeated as a pitcher. He also won a silver medal of merit for perfect attendance through all four years in school. Ultimately, Amardeep was awarded a merit based scholarship to Marquette University – the Presidential Leadership Scholarship.

=== Undergraduate college career – Marquette University ===
Kaleka was accepted into the Marquette University TRIO program – Student Support Services. He also continued to play Baseball and joined the Army ROTC program. After three years in the program, he decided to leave to focus on his academic career. During this time, he was also licensed as a private security person by the state of Wisconsin, and worked as a second shift supervisor of the then newly constructed Midwest Express Center.

Kaleka was also a fixture with the Indian Student Association, choreographing and organizing cultural programs on and off campus.

Kaleka graduated from the College of Arts and Sciences at Marquette University in 2001 with majors in Philosophy, Psychology, and Spanish Literature. He minored in Criminology.

From 1998 through 2001, he worked as a peer counselor for the Marquette University TRIO program, helping first generation incoming freshmen deal with the transition from high school to college.

==== The Handbook of Therapeutic Imagery Techniques ====
Before graduation, Kaleka was published by his professor Anees Sheikh in the book entitled, Handbook of Therapeutic Imagery Techniques under the Hypnobehavioral Approaches. Kaleka contributed to the Neurolinguistic Programming portion of the book:

The Handbook of Therapeutic Imagery Techniques consists primarily of a description of a multitude of imagery techniques. These approaches have been loosely grouped into four major categories: hypno-behavioral, cognitive-behavioral, psychodynamic/humanistic and humanistic/transpersonal.

=== Freedom's Price (2000) ===
In 2000, Amar raised funds from his community at the time to create and develop his first feature film, Freedom's Price. The film followed the lives of teens living through the struggles of the inner city in the 90s.

=== Teaching ===
Kaleka began teaching at NOVA Middle/High School, a charter school with the Milwaukee Public School system. He taught high school English Literature, History and Health in his first year, while he coached chess, and assisted basketball. He also became the Safe and Sound site coordinator. In his second year, he taught geology and astronomy in the middle school while continuing to coach chess.

=== Graduate school career – Savannah College of Art and Design ===
In September 2004, Amar entered an M.F.A. program at the Savannah College of Art & Design, focusing on film and television production.

In addition to his studies, Amar played flag football and was the founder and first president of the Savannah Film Collective, a student-run film group. Amar directed over twenty short film projects including the following list:

- Grass Between My Lips (2008) – Winner of the Remy Award at the Houston International Film Festival
- Love Letter (2008) – Made for Project Greenlight: Finalist submission.
- We The People (2008)
- Binding Faith (2007)

Kaleka was the cinematographer and editor of many more films during his time at SCAD including the following list:

- Threads (2005)
- Employee of the Month (2005)

Kaleka graduated with a MFA in Film and Television production in 2009 with the submission of his thesis entitled: Crouching India, Hidden China: A Glimpse into the Global Entertainment Marketplace.

An excerpt of the thesis reads:

For many reasons Hollywood has enjoyed a century of dominance in the worldwide film industry. Though it continues to thrive, trends and technologies are threatening the comfortable position that Hollywood has been accustomed to holding. Production and markets outside of California are continually growing, and studios are beginning to respond to the cultural shift. While Hollywood has organization and experience on its side, international entertainment industries are training their slingshots on the American Goliath.

=== Baby Blues, also known as Cradle Will Fall (2008) ===
Before he finished school, he was hired to co-direct his first feature film, Baby Blues, which had a $1.1 Million dollar budget. The executive producer was Andy Meyer from Fried Green Tomatoes and The Breakfast Club. The other director, Lars Jacobson was the writer of the project, while Kaleka edited the film. Both, Kaleka and Jacobson produced the project and found distribution.

The summary of Baby Blues is the following:

On a secluded family farm, a mother suffers a psychotic break due to postpartum depression, forcing the eldest son to protect his siblings from the mother they have always known and loved.

The film went on to run for a week in theaters, and then sold on DVD for many years gaining some critical acclaim with horror film fans.

=== Neverending Light Productions ===
In 2009, Kaleka founded Neverending Light Productions with partner Jared Bonshire. Originally, the offices ran out of Atlanta, but expanded quickly to Orlando.

=== Wisconsin Sikh temple shooting ===
Kaleka's father, Satwant Kaleka Singh, was president and founder of the Gurdwara of Wisconsin, located in Oak Creek, Wisconsin. On 5 August 2012, Kaleka's father and six other members were killed in a mass shooting at a Sikh temple in Wisconsin. In the aftermath of the shooting, Kaleka became interested in politics, supporting gun control and promoting new legislation to reduce hate crimes. Kaleka criticized President Barack Obama, who visited the sites of other mass shootings, but not the Sikh Temple.

As a member of the Democratic Party, Kaleka ran for the United States House of Representatives in Wisconsin's 1st congressional district in the 2014 election, challenging incumbent Paul Ryan. He faced Rob Zerban, who lost to Ryan in the 2012 elections and in the 2014 elections, in the Democratic primary. On 12 August 2014, Kaleka lost to Zerban, getting 22% of the vote.

=== Alleged domestic violence ===
In 2015, two restraining orders were filed against Kaleka. The first was filed by his wife and the later by a woman he had been having an extramarital affair with. According to court records, testimony given by Mr. Kaleka's wife and later obtained by the news agency WISN, temporary restraining order had previously been filed in late 2014, after his wife called 911 during a dispute. The domestic violence investigation is still ongoing. Kaleka's parental rights were terminated in July 2019 as part of his divorce.

== See also ==
- Sirius (2013)
