= Ademar José Gevaerd =

Brazilian journalist (1962–2022)

Ademar Gevaerd
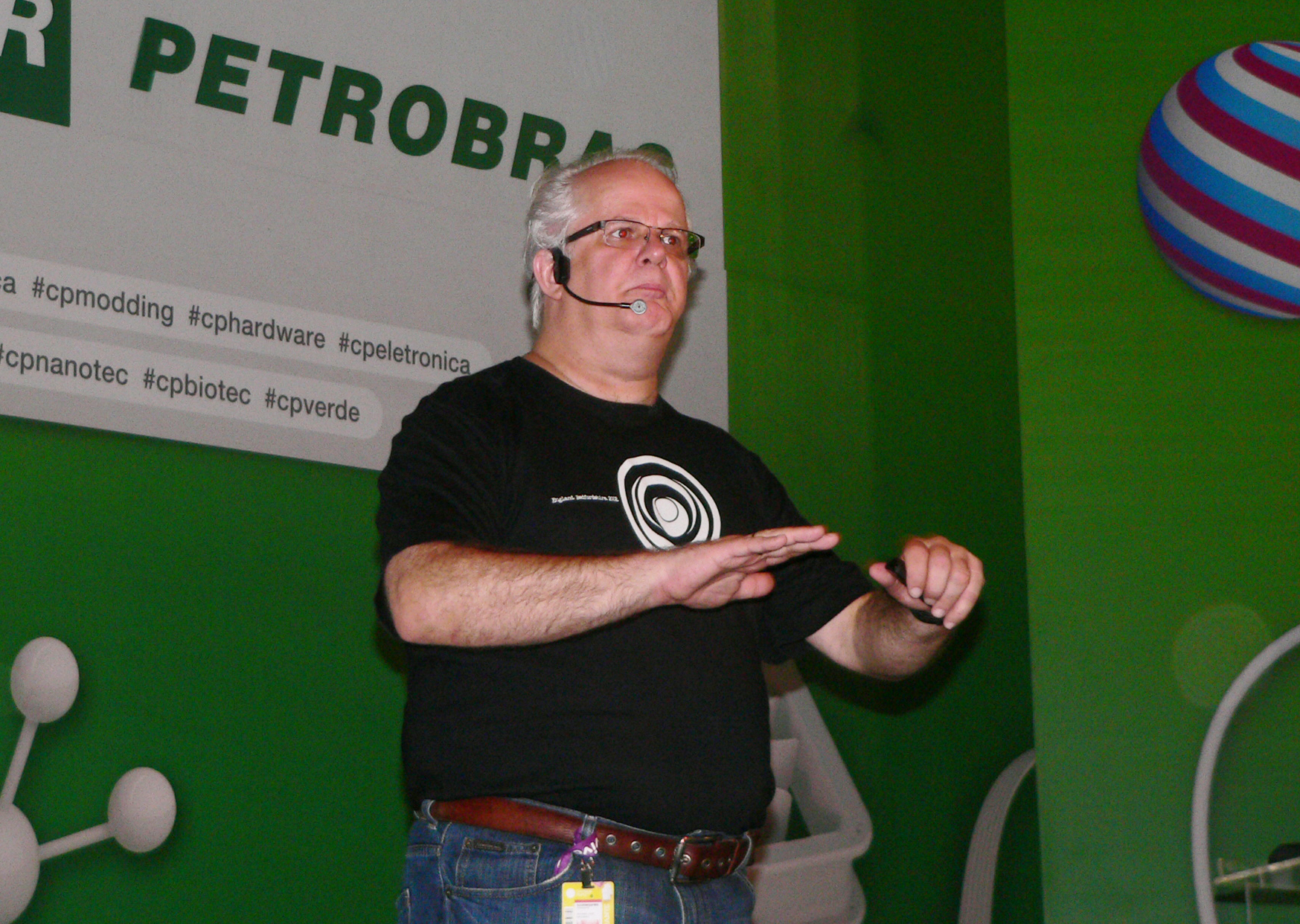
- A.J. Gevaerd delivering a lecture about crop circles at the 6th edition of Campus Party Brasil
- Born: Ademar José Gevaerd; 19 March 1962; Maringá, Paraná, Brazil
- Died: 9 December 2022 (aged 60); Curitiba, Paraná, Brazil
- Occupation: Ufologist
- Known for: Editor-in-chief of Revista UFO

Ademar José Gevaerd (19 March 1962 – 9 December 2022), also known simply as A. J. Gevaerd was a Brazilian ufologist. He was editor of Revista UFO (UFO Magazine), founder and director of the Brazilian Center for Flying Saucer Research (CBPDV) and Brazilian Director for Mutual UFO Network (MUFON). He represented Brazil at the Center for UFO Studies. He appeared on the Globo Network, the Discovery Channel and the History Channel. He spoke in many cities in Brazil and in other 29 countries, and conducted over 700 field investigations of UFO cases in Brazil. He was described as one of the most respected of ufologists.

== Early career ==
Gevaerd was born in Maringá on 19 March 1962, On 6 March 1982, spectators at a football match at the Morenão stadium in Campo Grande saw a cigar-shaped object with lights at each end flying overhead. At that time, Ademar José Gevaerd was teaching chemistry in Maringá, Paraná state. Convinced that the object was a flying saucer, and hearing of other sightings at the same time in São Paulo, Paraná, Argentina, Bolivia and Paraguay, he decided to undertake a deeper study of UFOs. In 1985 he launched the magazine Ufologia Nacional & Internacional, which ceased publication in 1986. In 1988 he started UFO Magazine, which still being published in 2014. In 1986 he left his teaching job to devote himself full-time to UFOs. The monthly UFO Magazine now has a circulation of 30,000. Gevaerd also ran the Brazilian Center for Flying Saucer Research, with 3,300 members. While attending a conference in Las Vegas in 1992, he personally experienced what may have been a UFO while driving in the Nevada Desert in the US, near the Area 51 military base.

== Views on UFOs ==
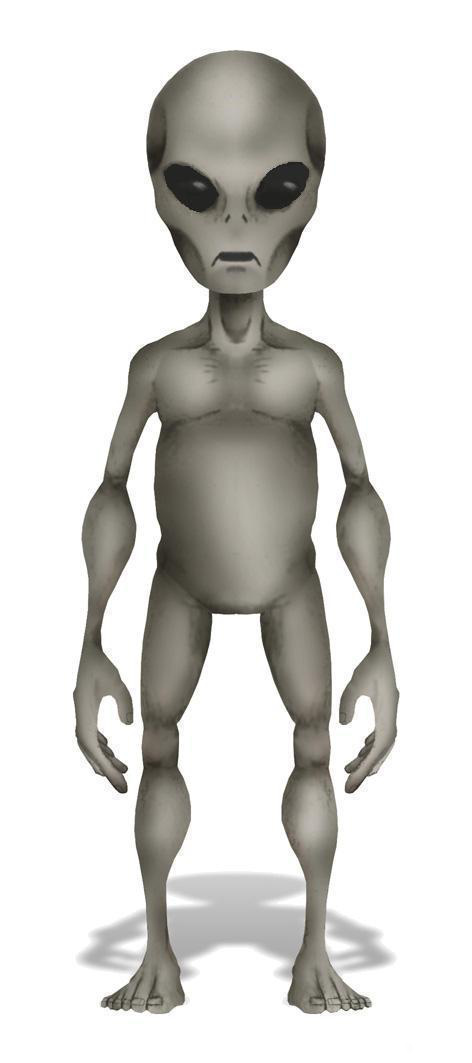
Artistic impression of a grey alien

At a 1996 conference in Chile, Gevaerd reported that UFO sightings around the world had risen by more than 200% in the past year. He said "there are places where there has been a 400 percent rise. This means a true wave of UFOs visiting Earth, and I have more then [sic] 100 slides to prove it." Speaking at the Australian International UFO Symposium in Brisbane, Queensland, Australia in October 1996, he discussed two aliens allegedly captured by the army after their space vehicle crashed in Varginha, Brazil on 20 January 1996. The description of one of the creatures was similar to that of the standard short grey alien, but it had greasy brown skin, red eyes and protuberances that could have been horns. Both aliens were viewed by many witnesses, but the army warned them not to discuss the subject. Speaking later, he said that six aliens were captured and several parts of their UFO. There were witnesses among the firefighters who were the first officials on the scene, and the military confirmed the story.

In 1997 Gevaerd's Brazilian Committee of Ufologists organized the First World Forum of Ufology in Brazil, held in Brasília. Answering questions from the audience during a 2001 talk show, he described the great advances that had been made in ufology in recent years, and particularly in Brazil, which he described as a leading center of research. He defended serious research into UFOs against quackers seeking to make money, and commentators who ridiculed the subject. He discussed the many documented sightings, including reports in the Bible. He noted that there was evidence that extraterrestrials had been involved in the construction of the Egyptian pyramids. He said that many different alien species had visited Earth, and that for some reason all had two arms, a torso, two legs and a head.

Gevaerd has denounced the controversial Urandir Fernandes de Oliveira, saying he had faked images of UFOs with devices such as laser pens. He discussed two flying saucer videos created by French-American artist, Barzolff and said "It was the largest UFO phenomenon over the past 10 years. But it was a deliberate fraud. These things, while they popularize ufology, they stink." He said that unmasking fraud is a major job for ufologists, easy to produce and release videos makes it difficult to separate what is fabricated from what is just inexplicable.

In July 2008 Gevaerd asked "If we already have machines that can investigate the soil of Mars, why should other extraterrestrial beings be unable to develop technology to reach Earth?" He said the problem is that the governments of various countries treat the issue as something top secret, but expressed hope that policy makers were beginning to change their attitude. In August 2008 he claimed that acceptance of ETs had never been higher. He said that 6 or 7 of every 10 persons polled are at least more sure than not, that we are not alone in the universe and that we are visited by other species.

In February 2007 the feature-length documentary Fastwalkers was released, featuring interviews of Gevaerd and others on the subject of UFOs and extraterrestrials. In July 2007 the offices of UFO Magazine were raided, with valuable information taken from filing cabinet folders, along with four computers. A police officer said "it is clear that the action was premeditated and carried out by elements that had knowledge of the activities of UFO Magazine, experience with computers and knew where to find the company's most important files." Gevaerd said that efforts to stop publication would have the opposite effect. That week the magazine launched its 25th DVD documentary, The Phoenix Lights, depicting one of the largest UFO waves in the news, in March 1997, in the city of the state of Arizona, USA.

Gevaerd was a keynote speaker in June 2008 at the first International Meeting of ufology experts in Lisbon, discussing the Varginha UFO incident. In August 2009 he was a keynote speaker at a ufology conference in San Clemente, Chile. He was slated as a speaker at the 18th Annual International UFO Congress Convention and Film Festival in Laughlin, Nevada in February 2009, speaking on the need for the public to demand that the government release information about extraterrestrial life.

== Crop circles ==
Discussing UFO sightings and crop circles that appeared near Riolândia, São Paulo in January 2000, he said that the bent reeds were not evidence. What counted was the appearance of discoidal objects. In 2002, Gevaerd investigated crop circles in the fields of Alton Barnes in southern England, 30 km from the resort of Avebury. He speculated that the circles and other designs in the British fields represented some kind of coded message. In November 2008, crop circles were found in the west of Santa Catarina. Gevaerd investigated the circles, which he said were similar to crop circles he had investigated in Europe, starting with fields located some 150 miles from London. Later he found that they were fraudulent. He said they differed in significant respects from genuine crop circles, and there was evidence of fabrication.

== Government information ==
Gevaerd said that one of the reasons why ufologists do not let themselves be discouraged by lack of proof for their theories is due to the fact most of them believe in the existence of a government conspiracy to hide the truth from the people. On 15 April 2004, Gevaerd's Brazilian Committee of Ufologists launched a campaign called "Freedom of Information Now!" with the goal of pressuring the government to release information on UFO sightings.

On 20 May 2005, Gevaerd led a delegation of ufologists who met with Brazilian Air Force officials in Brasília headed by Brigadier Telles Ribeiro, chief of the Air Force's Center for Public Communications. In an interview after the meeting, Gevaerd said his group had been shown information on three specific cases: the testimony of the head of Varig, Nagib Ayub, on a UFO seen in the airspace in Rio Grande do Sul in 1954, testimony from pilots who pursued 21 UFOs flying over São Paulo, São José dos Campos and Rio de Janeiro in May 1986, and a Brazilian Air Force investigation of UFOs held in 1977 in Pará, by Colonel Uyrange Hollanda, who died in 1997. According to Hollanda, "we detected at least nine forms of objects. Probes, flying saucer-shaped spaceships... All reports were sent by the 1st COMAR to Brasilia." At a 2007 seminar on UFOs in Chile, he disclosed "Operation Saucer", a highly secret UFO research project conducted by the Brazilian Air Force.

In August 2008 Gevaerd stated that the government has plenty of information that UFOs enter Brazilian air space every day, but refuses to publish it. Discussing the campaign for release of government information, at a September 2008 meeting of UFO enthusiasts he stated, "We are being visited by many civilizations from other planets. I have a feeling that we will soon have an answer to the questions we are all seeking."

In April 2009, Gevaerd described the declassification of documents that have always been declared TOP SECRET as a historic event. He said no country had gone so far in the disclosure of information on UFOs. In September 2009, Gevaerd announced receipt of a significant new set of UFO-related government documents, some of which had been secret for 80 years. The documents included fresh details of UFO reports from the night of 19 May 1986, when 21 spherical objects, which according to military sources were 100 feet in diameter, were detected by radar and sighted by civilian pilots and literally blocked the main airports in Brazil including São Paulo and Rio de Janeiro. However, Gevaerd said in an interview that tapes of the interception operations from that event had been destroyed. In March 2010, Gevaerd discussed the downgrading of UFO documents by the administration of President Luiz Inácio Lula da Silva, saying that in 2009 he had received between 50 and 80 documents with a total of four thousand pages contained information from armed forces investigation of the UFO phenomenon.

In an August 2010 interview with Terra Magazine, Gevaerd commented on the Federal Government decree that the air force should send records of any UFO sightings to the National Archives, saying the decision was in response to the campaign by the Brazilian Committee of UFO enthusiasts for freedom of information. He noted that documents already released confirmed that UFOs had been sighted frequently, and said that the government had more than 12 tons of documents about these sightings. Commenting on some initial documents released by the Air Force on 20 March 1996 sightings of UFOs in five cities in southern Brazil, he said "It's just the tip of the iceberg." The Air Force stated that they would not release any secret documents. Brigadier José Carlos Pereira, in charge of UFO records, said "If an extraordinary phenomenon happens, it is obvious that it will be kept under wraps."

== Personal life ==
Gevaerd had three children, Daniel, Daniela and Pedro. Daniel took part in the "Casa de Vidro" (Glass House), a preliminary stage of the Big Brother Brasil 9, but did not make it to the main stage. Daniela was the manager and administrator of Revista Ufo, and died on 8 March 2015 in Campo Grande in a car crash. Pedro is a high school student.

Gevaerd died in Curitiba on 9 December 2022, at the age of 60.
