= Campo Largo case =

2026 alleged UFO sighting in Brazil

The Campo Largo case refers to videos of unusual lights and sounds posted to social media by digital influencer Mayk Leão, who claimed he recorded unidentified flying objects from his farm on May 31, 2026, in the rural area of the municipality of Campo Largo, Paraná, Brazil. Leão's claims received widespread media coverage in Brazil, on social networks, and among UFOlogists. The lights in the video were later determined by image analysis as the misinterpretation of ground lights, likely from a nearby campsite called Chácara Paraíso.

== Claims ==
Mayk Leão, a nursing technician and digital influencer, lived alone on a rural property located in a region of forests and mountains within the municipality of Campo Largo. The site was known for housing hundreds of rescued animals and for its limited infrastructure, being accessible via an unpaved road and having restricted communication with urban areas.

According to Leão, on the morning of May 31, 2026 the animals on the property showed signs of agitation, and he initially believed it to be the presence of some wild predator. Leão said he found part of an electric fence knocked down, and claimed to have heard unusual sounds coming from the vegetation he described as metallic clicks, roars, and mechanical noises. Leão said that later in the day he heard noises resembled gears, ratchets, or the passage of a large vessel over his residence. Leão livestreamed and also posted recordings claimed to be of these sounds on his social media.

Leão claimed that on the same evening, he observed bright lights over a forested area located several kilometers from his residence. According to his account, the lights were above the trees and near a riverbed, remaining visible for approximately twenty to forty minutes. Leão posted media of lights in a circular formation alternating in intensity and position. The images were widely shared on social media, reaching millions of views within a few days. Subsequently, Leão claimed to have observed a second, larger object moving over the property, and produced a drawing representing the shape he believed he had seen.

== Reaction ==
The release of Leão's videos generated intense public reaction and media coverage in Brazil, and even some international media outlets. Leão's number of followers increased significantly.

The images in Leão's videos were attributed to various causes, including drones, atmospheric phenomena, conventional aircraft, or optical effects resulting from distance and filming conditions, while some UFOlogists claimed they could be evidence of UFO's and expressed interest in analyzing the site and the original recording files.

In a statement released to the press, the Brazilian Air Force, through the Department of Airspace Control, informed that no unknown object was detected by air defense radars in the region during the period of the alleged sighting, adding that airspace control occurred within normal parameters.

Internet users compared the sounds in Leão's video and sound effects present in the trailer for Steven Spielberg's film Disclosure Day, and speculated it was a marketing promotion.

The widespread reaction also led to statements from public figures and artists, including singer Anitta, who expressed support for the influencer following the threats and virtual attacks he reported as a result of his claims. Host and survivalist Luciano Tigre hiked to the location he believed to be the area where the sighting occurred.

According to Brazilian news site Jundiai Agora, by tracking coordinates from Leão's residence, an image analyst later showed that the lights recorded on the night of May 31st were most likely emanated from a specific escarpment near a campsite called Chácara Paraíso. The analysis concluded that the distance and atmospheric conditions produced an unusual visual effect, and that Leão probably didn't observe it every night since the campsite's lights are turned off during periods of no occupancy.

== See also ==
- List of reported UFO sightings
- UFO sightings in Brazil
