= Operação Prato =

UFO investigation by the Brazilian Air Force

Operation Plate (Operação Prato)
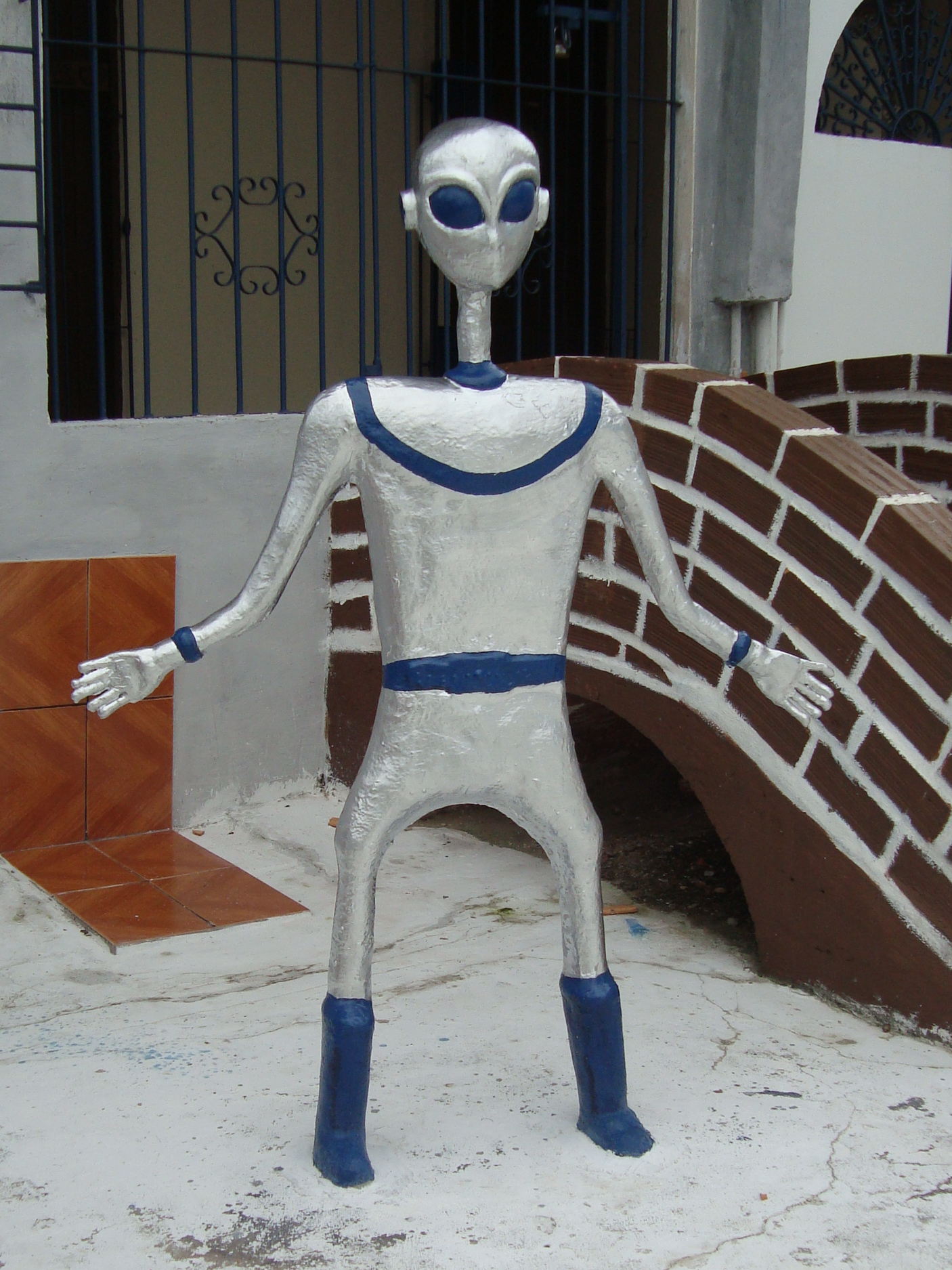
- Many restaurants on Colares show images that refer to the UFO flap
- Location: Colares, Pará, Brazil; 0°56′13″S 48°16′55″W
- Commanded by: Brig. Protásio Lopes de Oliveira (Strategical chief); Col. Camillo Ferraz (Tactical chief); Cpt. Uyrangê Hollanda (Operational chief); Sgt. João Flávio de Freitas Costa (rapporteur)
- Objective: Investigation of UFOs sightings in some municipalities of Pará
- Date: First phase: 20 October – 11 November 1977; Second phase: 25 November – 5 December 1977
- Executed by: Brazilian Air Force; National Information Service
- Outcome: Operation found no unusual phenomena

Operation Saucer (Portuguese: Operação Prato; literally, Operation Plate) was an investigation carried out between 1977 and 1978 by the Brazilian Air Force following alleged UFO sightings on the island of Colares. The investigation was closed after finding no unusual phenomena.

== History ==
=== Precedent events ===
In 1977, numerous UFOs were reported on the Brazilian island Colares, Pará. Local residents claimed that scars on their bodies were caused by the lights in the sky, and named the lights "Chupa Chupa" (literally Sucker-Sucker, local name for a "Lollipop"). Believing it would keep the lights away, residents of Colares organized night vigils, lit fires, and ignited fireworks. Mayor José Ildone Favacho Soeiro requested help from the Air Force.

=== The Operation ===
The operation was commanded by Captain Uyrangê Bolivar Soares Nogueira de Hollanda Lima. During late 1977, several pictures of lights were recorded but the military remained skeptical. After approximately four months, the operation was closed after finding no unusual phenomena. The official documents can be obtained from the Brazilian National Archives (Arquivo Nacional).

=== Conspiracy theories ===
In 1997, two decades after the operation, Captain Uyrangê gave an interview to Ufologists Ademar José Gevaerd and Marco Antônio Petit where he recounted his experiences living alongside his men. Three months after the interview, he was found dead in his home "after he seemingly hung himself using the belt of his bathrobe", attracting the interest of conspiracy theorists.

=== UFOlogists ===
According to ufologist Jacques Vallée, a number of individuals were reportedly killed as a result of the "lights" fired upon them by the UFOs, and injuries were consistent with radiation effects from microwaves. Other ufologists claimed that the lights from UFOs sucked blood from 400 people.

== See also ==
- Ball lightning
- UFO sightings in Brazil
- Varginha UFO incident
