= Gildas Bourdais =

French ufologist (1939–2024)

- Born: 13 June 1939; Nantes, France
- Died: 25 September 2024 (aged 85); Paris, France
- Education: HEC Paris
- Occupation: Ufologist

Gildas Bourdais (13 June 1939 – 25 September 2024) was a publishing executive, painter, and French ufologist writer who supported the "extraterrestrial hypothesis" (ETH).

== Biography ==
After preparatory classes at the Lycée Louis-le-Grand, he graduated from HEC Paris (1960–1962).

His research focused in particular on the Roswell incident, on stories of extraterrestrial apparitions in major religious texts, and on the COMETA report.

He translated several books on ufology by different authors, including American ufologists Roger Leir and Leslie Kean, into French.

He collaborated with Top Secret magazine, and often appeared on the Ici et Maintenant! radio programme.

== Bibliography ==
- 1990: Les modernes et les autres; Cent ans d'art moderne dans le monde, Livre Total SA, Lausanne (Switzerland), 367p. ISBN 2-88253-018-8
- 1994: Enquête sur l'existence d'êtres célestes et cosmiques, Filipacchi, Paris, 412p. ISBN 2-85018-246-X
- 1995: Sont-ils déjà là ? Extraterrestres, L'Affaire Roswell, Presses du Châtelet, Paris, 225p. ISBN 2-911217-04-7
- 1997: OVNIS : 50 ans de secret, les dossiers, les témoignages..., Presses du Châtelet, Paris, 311p. ISBN 2-911217-22-5
- 2001: OVNIS : La levée progressive du secret, JMG, coll. « Science-conscience », Agnières, 434p. ISBN 2-912507-38-3
- 2004: Roswell : Enquêtes, secret et désinformation, JMG, coll. « Science-conscience », Agnières, 480p. ISBN 2-915164-07-X
- 2007: Visions célestes, visions cosmiques, Le Temps Présent, coll. « Enigma », Agnières, 407p. ISBN 2-35185-017-3
- 2009: Le crash de Roswell : Enquête inédite, Le Temps Présent, coll. « Enigma », Agnières, 390p. ISBN 2-35185-034-3
- 2010: OVNIS : Vers la fin du secret ?, Le Temps Présent, coll. « Fonction Psi », Agnières, 432p. ISBN 2-35185-060-2
- 2017: Roswell. La vérité. Editions l'Archipel, May 2017, 288p. EAN 9782845927117
- 2017: Médias et complots. Manipulations et vérités, JMG Editions, May 2017, 281 p. ISBN 9782357840324

=== Translator ===
- 2004: Roger K. Leir, Des extraterrestres capturés à Varginha au Brésil, le nouveau Roswell, Le Mercure dauphinois, coll. « Les dossiers non classés », Grenoble, 200p. ISBN 2-913826-50-4
- 2008: Colm A. Kelleher et George Knapp, La science confrontée à l'inexpliqué sur un ranch isolé de l'Utah (Hunt for the skinwalker), translation with Francis Turcat, Le Mercure dauphinois, Grenoble, 381p. ISBN 978-2-35662-007-1
- 2012: Roger K. Leir, Contacts OVNI. La dernière frontière, translation with Alain Charoy, Le Mercure dauphinois, Grenoble, 221p. ISBN 978-2-35662-048-4
- 2014: Leslie Kean, Des généraux, des pilotes et des officiels parlent, Dervy Editions, 430 p. (Original title. "UFOs. Generals, Pilots, and Government Officials Go on the Record". Harmony Books, New York, 2010) ISBN 1024200310
