= Colares =

Colares may refer to:

- Colares, Pará, a municipality in the State of Pará, Brazil
- Colares (Sintra), a civil parish in the municipality of Sintra, Portugal
