= UFO sightings in Brazil =

List of alleged UFO sightings in the nation of Brazil

This is a list of alleged sightings of unidentified flying objects or UFOs in Brazil.

== 1947 ==
- On 23 July 1947, topographer José Higgins was working with laborers in Bauru, São Paulo, when they suddenly heard an extremely sharp sound. Some moments later, they saw a lens-shaped object landing near them. The workmen ran away, leaving Higgins alone. The man reported that three humanoid figures emerged from the UFO and spoke to him in an unknown language. After about a half hour, they returned to the UFO, which then departed.

== 1952 ==
- On 5 May 1952, the journalist Joao Martins and the photographer Eduardo Keffel claimed to have seen a flying disc in the vicinity of Barra da Tijuca. Keffel took some photographs of the UFO, which were published by the magazine O Cruzeiro.

== 1957 ==
- On 13 September 1957, the journalist Ibrahim Sued received an envelope containing a letter and three fragments of metal. The author of the letter wrote that he saw a UFO which exploded in the sky over the beach of Ubatuba; he collected some fragments and sent three of these to the journalist together with the letter. Sued sent the fragments to a laboratory which analyzed them and discovered that they consisted of pure magnesium. James Harder and other ufologists came to the conclusion that the fragments of Ubatuba have an extraterrestrial origin, but other investigators think that this story is a hoax.
- Antonio Villas Boas claimed to have been abducted by extraterrestrials on 16 October 1957. Though similar stories had circulated for years beforehand, Boas' claims were among the first alien abduction stories to receive wide attention.
- On the evening of 4 November 1957, two sentinels at the Itaipu Fort (Praia Grande, São Paulo) suffered moderate burns after being hit by a heat wave from an unidentified flying object, which allegedly came descending from the sky. The fort's electrical system, including the emergency circuits, went down during the incident. Afterwards, Brazilian Army and United States Air Force (USAF) personnel, along with investigators of the Brazilian Air Force, flew to the fort to interview the soldiers. USAF's Donald Keyhoe expressed his opinions on the case:

"In the search for a motive one U. S. Air Force officer recalled the Project Sign report. Some project members believed the Earth had been observed periodically by an advanced race, and their opinions were on record:

'Such a civilization might observe that on Earth we now have atomic bombs and are fast developing [space] rockets. In view of the past history of mankind [frequent wars indicating a belligerent human race] they should be alarmed. We should therefore expect at this time above all to behold such visitations.'

According to this, the aliens' main purpose was to keep watch on our space developments, in fear that we would become a threat to other worlds. If this theory were correct, it might be stretched to link the launching of the Sputniks with the Fort Itaipu attack.

But this seemed preposterous, as all the investigators agreed. It would mean that the aliens were worried by our first feeble steps into space, by tiny spacecraft as primitive as a dugout canoe compared with an ocean liner. It would also mean that the burnings were intended as a demonstration of superior weapons they could use against aggressive explorers from Earth. But we were years from manned space travel, even to the moon. By human logic, we could not possibly menace an advanced space race now — if ever."

In 2008, a document reporting the incident was written at the Brazilian Embassy in the United States.

== 1958 ==
- At 12:00 pm on 16 January 1958, the notable Trindade Island case occurred. The Brazilian ship Almirante Saldanha, taking part in projects of the International Geophysical Year, was preparing to sail away from Ilha de Trindade, off the coast of Espírito Santo. Captain Viegas was on the deck with several scientists and members of the crew when he suddenly noticed a flying object, which had a "ring" around it, just like Saturn. Everyone reportedly saw the UFO at the same time. It came to the island from the east, flew towards the Pico Desejado (Desired Peak), made a steep turn and went away very quickly to the northwest. As soon as the object was noticed, Almiro Baraúna was asked to photograph the apparent anomaly. After going up the quarterdeck, he stated that he managed to take pictures of the object.

== 1966 ==
- Two men were found dead near Niterói. Both were wearing lead masks. A UFO allegedly was seen flying near the point where both had died.
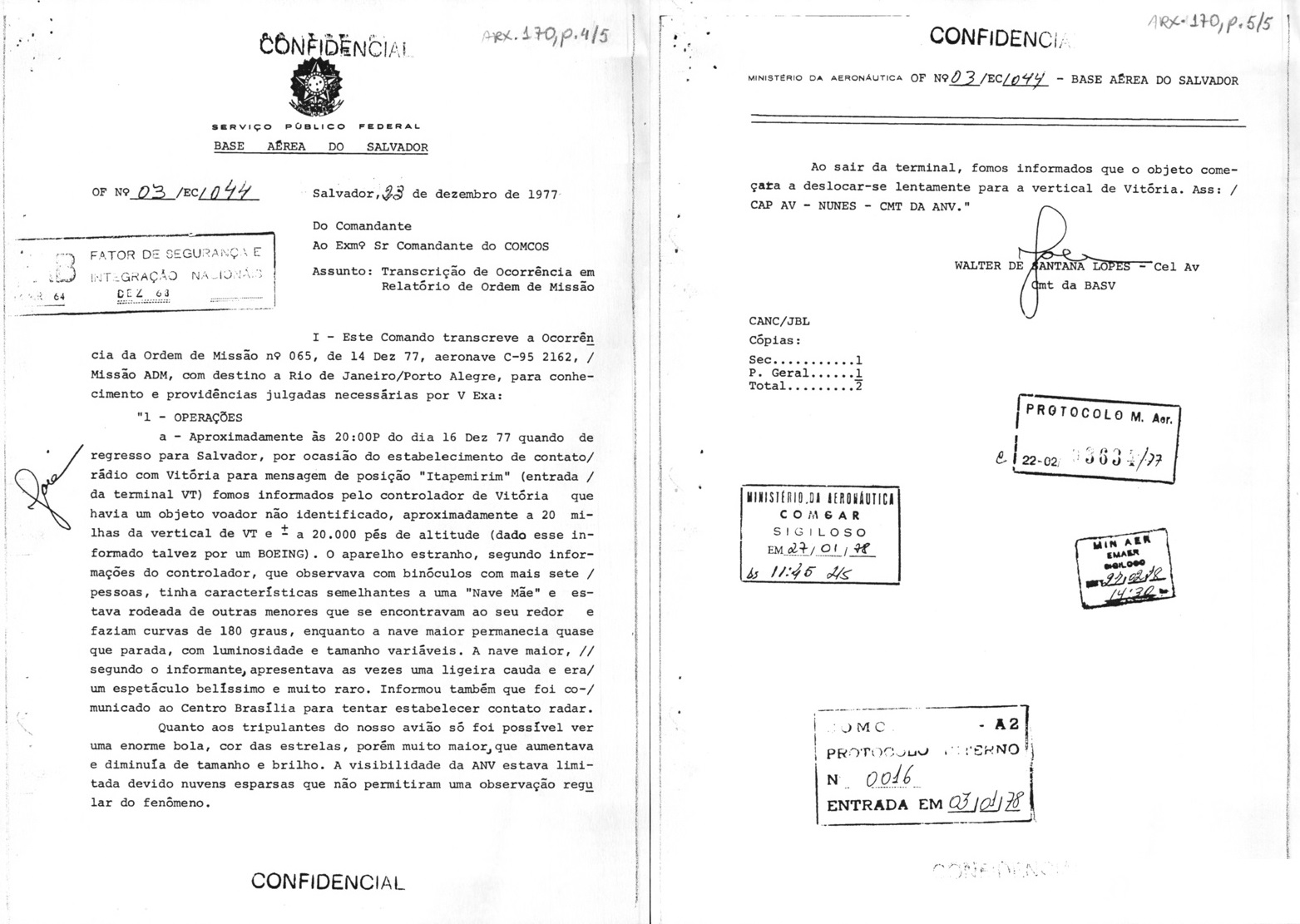
  UFO occurred in December 1977, in Bahia. National Archives of Brazil.
  According to veteran ufologist Alberto Francisco do Carmo, sightings and encounters northwest of São Paulo led to the development in 1966 of an office called SIOANI (for Serviço de Informação de Objetos Aéreos Não Identificados). Headed by Major Gilberto Zani de Melo, the study and office were shut down years after his retirement.

== 1977 ==
- The Colares UFO flap refers to an outbreak of UFO sightings that occurred in 1977 on the Brazilian island of Colares. During the outbreak, the UFOs allegedly attacked the citizens with intense beams of radiation that left burn marks and puncture wounds. These sightings led to the Brazilian government dispatching a team to investigate under the codename Operação Prato ("Operation Saucer"). The government later recalled the team and classified the files until the late 1990s. This was the first operation of the Brazilian Air Force conducted only to investigate UFO-related issues. This operation was started shortly after the Colares UFO flap.

== 1979 ==
- On 16 May, a farmer named Arlindo Gabriel reported the landing of four strange objects near Baependi, Minas Gerais. He was allegedly taken inside one of them, and interacted with its crew members. The occupants appeared to have ordinary human forms, but they stood approximately 1.5 metres (4.9 ft) tall and possessed large almond-shaped eyes. After the incident, a pressure mark was found at the scene, consistent with an object weighing more than 3 metric tons (3.3 short tons; 3.0 long tons). A cloth with images and an unidentified language was also reportedly recovered.
- On the evening of 28 July, security guard Antonio Carlos Ferreira was allegedly abducted from his workplace, a furniture factory in Mirassol, São Paulo. According to his own accounts, he was approached by three humanoid figures who tranquilized him and took him aboard a small ship, which ferried him to a larger craft further away. There, he said he was positioned in front of a large television-like device and presented with a variety of images before being forced to mate with a female humanoid, after which he was tranquilized again and returned to the ground. Ferreira described the beings as being approximately 1.2 metres (3.9 ft; 120 cm) tall with pointed ears, slanted eyes, and human-like mouths. They lacked eyebrows or eyelashes and spoke in a language that superficially resembled Japanese. Some were said to have dark skin and red curly hair, while others had light skin and straight black hair. The ship was spherical with three undercarriage-like legs protruding from the bottom, with the interior lit by bright red and green lights. Ferreira stated that he encountered the humanoids again in 1982, with the craft supposedly landing close enough for him to see the female being and a childlike being observing him from a distance. He said he experienced a third encounter later in 1982, in which he was taken into the hangar of a craft via a green beam of light before being injected with a yellow substance. He said he was then taken to meet the two beings once more, the younger of whom he was led to believe was his own child. Other encounters are said to have followed, a total of 16 or 20 between 1979 and 1989.

== 1980 ==
- In 1980, Elias Seixas de Mattos, a truck driver from Rio de Janeiro, claimed to have experienced an abduction by unknown beings. His story, along with those reported by his two friends, has become noteworthy in Brazilian ufology because of the quantity of details he described.

== 1982 ==
- A sighting occurred on 6 March 1982, during a match of the 1982 Campeonato Brasileiro Série A between Operário-MS and CR Vasco da Gama. The Morenão stadium hosted an audience of more than 24,000 people, and several sightings of unidentified objects were reported, including from players such as Cocada and the match referee, José de Assis Aragão. Ademar José Gevaerd, a prominent Brazilian UFO researcher, began his career in the field of ufology as one of the witnesses to this phenomenon.

== 1986 ==
- A series of UFO sightings occurred over the states of southeastern Brazil, which led to several jet fighters being scrambled to intercept. During the attempted interceptions, pilots reported the objects were capable of 90-degree turns and hypersonic flight.

== 1995 ==
- In the early hours of 12 January 1995, a luminous object was seen falling vertically onto a farm in the Jaíba district, east of Feira de Santana, Bahia. Shortly after the UFO fell, a major power outage occurred that spread across dozens of nearby cities.

== 1996 ==
- The Varginha UFO incident is a particularly well-known event in Brazilian ufology. In Varginha, Brazil, unidentified flying objects and unknown humanoids (allegedly extraterrestrials) were reported. The beings were supposedly captured by Brazilian officials.
- Above Saragonha Island, located in the Patos Lagoon, Haroldo Westendorff witnessed a cone-shaped UFO, 50 to 60 metres (160 to 200 ft) tall, with a base as big as a soccer stadium. He flew around the object for some 15 minutes, keeping a distance of 100 metres (330 ft; 110 yd). The rotating object was heading towards the sea. The Infraero airport operator at Pelotas confirmed that he also witnessed an anomalous object in the direction of Westendorff's reported sighting. It was not detected by Cindacta II in Curitiba, Paraná, which was responsible for watching the skies of southern Brazil. Westendorff also reported a smaller object coming out of the top of the big UFO, which climbed into the skies at a very fast speed, with the larger UFO following shortly thereafter. The Ministry of Aeronautics launched a secret investigation into the sighting.

== 2008 ==
- In 2014, a document called "Dossier Riolândia" was produced by the amateur organization Inape (Instituto de Astronomia e Pesquisa Espacial (Institute of Astronomy and Space Research)) which alleged that UFOs appeared in the city of Riolândia on 20 January 2008.
- The Cláudio Case was particularly well-documented by Brazil's Military Police. It occurred on 19 and 20 November 2008, when members of the Military Police reportedly chased luminous humanoids and photographed UFOs in Cláudio, Minas Gerais. The case report was signed by seven military personnel and includes three photographs and a police report.

== 2013 ==
- On 19 June, a light was visible in the sky over one of the then-protests in Brazil, and seen by thousands attending the event. It was reported to be a UFO, but it is currently believed to have been a drone used by local newspaper Folha de S. Paulo in order to shoot aerial images of the demonstrations.

== 2020 ==
- On 12 May 2020, residents of the city of Magé, Rio de Janeiro, recorded videos of lights in the sky between 10:40 pm and 2:00 am. The recordings were shared on social networks, revealing that the anomalous lights were of different colors. Activity ranged from circular objects to strong flashes occurring on the horizon.

== 2022 ==
- On 4 and 5 November, several pilots reported a strange light over the banks of the Guaíba River, near Salgado Filho Airport, Porto Alegre. To date, no explanation has been given for this phenomenon.

== 2025 ==
- On 8 July 2025, residents of the municipalities of São Pedro and Piracicaba, São Paulo, spotted lights in the sky, which they alleged had been appearing in the region since the previous year. Cameras spotted an object flying abnormally in the night sky at around 8:30 pm.
- On 13 December, there were reports of mysterious lights appearing in the skies of Barras, Piauí. They were reported to have approached the residents of the community, especially on roads and near homes.

== 2026 ==
- On 31 May, digital influencer Mayk Leão discussed what is known in Brazil as the Campo Largo case. Leão held a series of live streams about an object with multiple lights filmed from his ranch in the Campo Largo region. Days after the event, a group of ufologists investigated and suggested the lights were instead a misidentification, originating from an inn located 10 kilometres (6.2 mi) away from the location of the sighting.

== See also ==
- List of reported UFO sightings
