= Arachnotermes =

Scientific classification
- Kingdom: Animalia
- Phylum: Arthropoda
- Subphylum: Chelicerata
- Class: Arachnida
- Order: Araneae
- Infraorder: Araneomorphae
- Family: Salticidae
- Subfamily: incertae sedis
- Genus: Arachnotermes; Mello-Leitão, 1928
- Species: A. termitophilus

Binomial name
- Arachnotermes termitophilus Mello-Leitão, 1928

Genus of spiders

Arachnotermes is a genus of jumping spiders. Its sole described species, Arachnotermes termitophilus, is only found in Brazil.

The female of this species has a body length of 2.5 mm. The body is hairy with black erect hairs and small white scales. The general color is white. On the cephalothorax is an arc of white scales. Two large transverse white lines are found on the abdomen. The underside is black.

This species is found in the nests of termites. It was first described from Varginha, Brazil. Its taxonomic relationships within the family Salticidae are uncertain.
