= Varginha UFO incident =

Purported UFO incident in Brazil in 1996

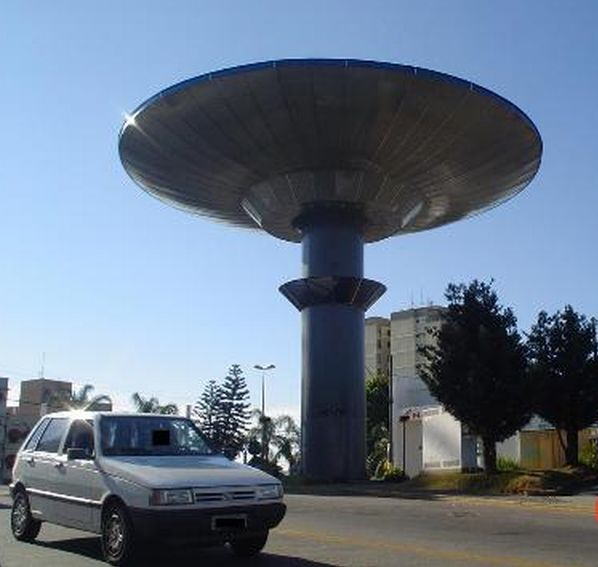
The spaceship-shaped water tower at the central park of Varginha City is a symbol of the UFO incident.

The Varginha UFO incident involves a series of events in 1996 wherein residents of Varginha, Brazil, claimed to have seen one or more strange humanoids and at least one unidentified flying object (UFO). The reports garnered extensive media coverage. Other associated claims included the capture of one or more extraterrestrial beings by the Brazilian authorities and unexplained animal fatalities at a zoo. An investigation by the Brazilian Army concluded that a city resident was mistaken for an alien being and the movement of military personnel in the region was routine.

== Overview ==
Around 3:30 p.m. on 20 January 1996, three females ranging from 14 to 22 years old claimed to have sighted an unknown being near a subdivision on a street known as Rua Dr. Benevenuto Braz Vieira. According to media reports, the women described the being as a large-headed biped with "spots like veins on the skin and three bumps on the head", further adding that the "eyes were two red balls". Later termed the "ET de Varginha", the alleged humanoid seemed to be wobbly or unsteady, which the women assumed was due to injury or illness. They said that they fled and told their mother that they had seen the "devil".

Rumors then spread through the area. Some people reported having observed UFOs in the days leading up to the incident. Further claims were later made of additional unidentified beings or extraterrestrials being collected and observed at a hospital, activity by military/police/government vehicles and personnel in the area, an unidentified animal "prowling" a local forest, the death of a police officer, and the unexplained deaths of a tapir, an ocelot, and two gray brockets occurring at the local zoo. Ufologists would later allege links between these and other claims.

== Official inquiry ==
In 1997, an official inquiry led by the Brazilian military concluded that the young women had encountered a mentally unstable man nicknamed "Mudinho" (lit. "Little Mute", real name Luiz Antônio de Paula). The commander of the 24th Military Police Battalion provided photographs of the man, stating that he "probably has some mental disability" and alleging that his "physical characteristics matched the description" of the reported being. Further, he concluded that this strengthened the hypothesis that "this citizen, probably being dirty, due to the heavy rains and seen crouching by a wall, was mistaken by the three terrified girls as a space creature". The head of the official inquiry also reported that the military trucks and personnel were performing routine duties on the night they were observed, stating, "the presence of the Firefighters in Jardim Andere, the parking of Army trucks in the vicinity of the concessionaire where their periodic maintenance would be carried out ... and the departure of EsSA vehicles ... were real facts ... incorrectly interpreted as Firefighters and the Military participating in the capture and later the transport of the alleged creature to Campinas."

Skeptic Brian Dunning criticized sensational media accounts and ufologists' claims. According to Dunning, "It is the most compelling example of a case where literally nothing at all happened that was remotely unusual, and was magnified into a case considered unassailable proof of alien visitation by many. To those believers, I would suggest recalibrating where you set the bar for quality of evidence."

== Tourism ==
These claims have markedly affected tourism to the city of Varginha. Grey alien dolls with football uniforms are sold at the location of the incident. Grey alien designs were used in advertising campaigns for the municipality. Bus stops were built in the form of spaceships and a 20-metre-tall (66 ft) water tower with a disc-shaped water reservoir was erected in the town center called the Nave Espacial de Varginha.

== Media ==
=== Books ===
- Incidente em Varginha, a 1996 Brazilian nonfiction book in Portuguese by ufologist Vitorio Pacaccini and writer Maxs Portes.
- O Caso Varginha, a 2001 Brazilian nonfiction book in Portuguese by Ubirajara Rodrigues, a ufologist and the main investigator of the case.
- UFO Crash in Brazil, a 2005 nonfiction book in English by American surgeon and ufologist Roger Leir.
- O.V.N.I L'affaire Varginha, a 2009 comic book in French by author Philippe Auger.
- Varginha, Toda a Verdade Revelada, a 2015 nonfiction book in Portuguese by ufologist Marco Antônio Petit (Revista UFO).
- Ginho – o ET de Varginha, a 2016 Brazilian comic book in Portuguese by cartoonist Marcio Baraldi.
- ETs de Varginha: Montando o Quebra-Cabeça, a 2022 nonfiction book in Portuguese by ufologist Edison Boaventura Jr.

=== Films & Documentaries ===
- "Alien Encounter", Episode 6 of the first season (1998) of Beyond the Truth directed by Bruce Burgess.
- "Alien Castaways", Episode 7 of the first season (2012) of National Geographic's Chasing UFOs series.
- 1996, a 2020 short film by director Rodrigo Brandão, revisits the event in a horror story made along the lines of a documentary (in the style of The Blair Witch Project). The story involves two teenagers going to the city of Varginha on 20 January 1996, who get lost in the woods at night and are found by an extraterrestrial.
- Moment of Contact, a 2022 documentary film by director James Fox.
- O Mistério de Varginha, a 2025 documentary by director Ricardo Calil and Paulo Gonçalves.

=== Others ===
- Incidente em Varginha, a 1998 Brazilian video game by Perceptum Informática inspired by these events.

== See also ==
- UFO sightings in Brazil
- 1986 Brazilian UFO incident
- Operação Prato
