= Nave Espacial de Varginha =

Coordinates: 21.559167°S 45.44°W

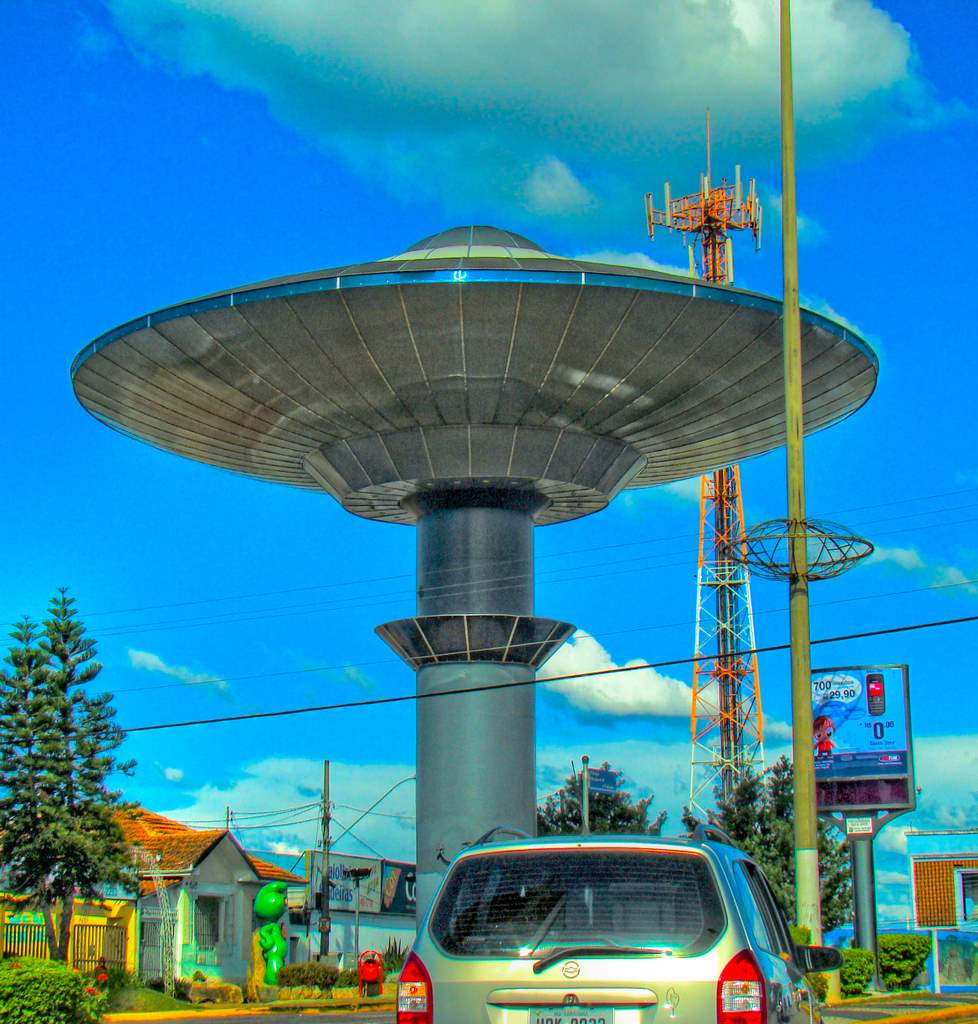
Nave Espacial de Varginha

The Nave Espacial de Varginha (Portuguese pronunciation: [ˈnavjispasiˈaw dʒi vaʁˈʒĩɲɐ], Varginha's spacecraft), located in Varginha, Brazil, is a 20-meter-tall water tower with a disc-shaped water reservoir. It was built in 2001, and commemorates the so-called Varginha UFO incident of 1996.
