= Roger Leir =

American physician

Roger Krevin Leir
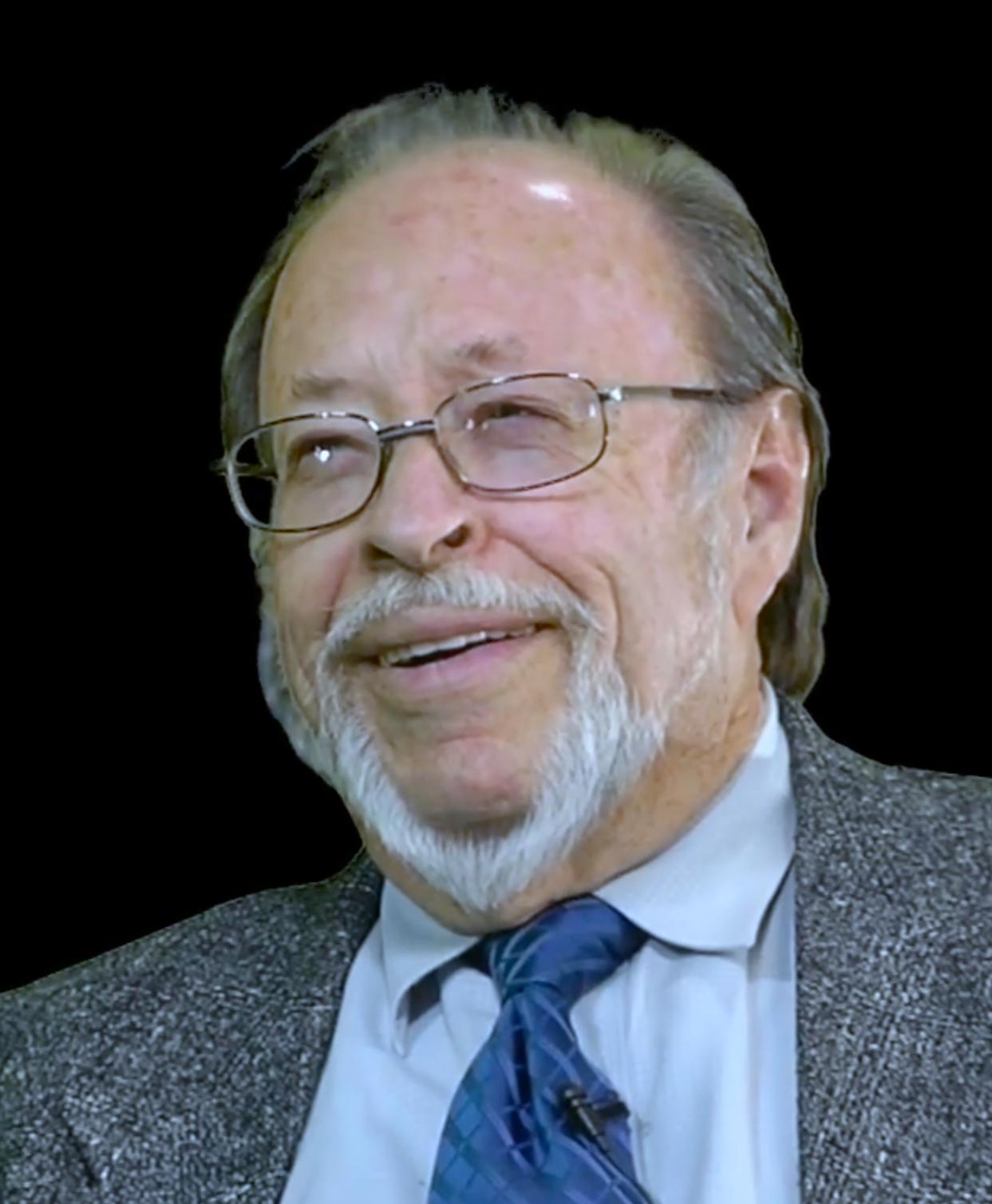
- Born: March 20, 1935; San Francisco, California, US
- Died: March 14, 2014 (aged 78); Thousand Oaks, California, US
- Occupations: Podiatric surgeon, ufologist
- Years active: 1964–2014
- Known for: Investigating of alien implants

Roger Krevin Leir (March 20, 1935 – March 14, 2014) was an American podiatric surgeon and ufologist best known as an investigator of alleged alien implants. Leir wrote books such as The Aliens and the Scalpel, and appeared on various radio and television shows, including Coast to Coast AM, claiming he had discovered proof of "non-terrestrial experimentation on man".

== Career ==
Leir was born in the San Francisco Bay area in 1935. He moved to southern California at age 13. He described his childhood imagination as “wild and vivid”, often fantasizing that he was able to fly. He attended the University of Southern California and graduated with a bachelor's degree in Science in 1961. In 1964, he qualified as a podiatrist, and later became involved with the local chapter of the Mutual UFO Network (MUFON).

At a MUFON conference in 1995, Leir examined X-rays from a woman who believed she was an abductee. He later extracted two small metallic foreign objects from her, and also from a second patient. The objects were analyzed by the New Mexico Institute of Mining and Technology, which determined that they were "composed of commonly found elements", such as iron or aluminum. In describing some of these elements, the lab report made reference to the composition of meteors. Leir interpreted this to mean that the objects removed from his patients were "of extraterrestrial origin". He came to believe the objects were devices implanted by aliens and "scientific proof of non-terrestrial experimentation on man". Leir soon became prominent in the alien abduction and UFO communities. He hired a dentist, a radiologist and a general surgeon to assist him in his practice. Leir claimed the objects he removed from patients emitted “deep space frequency radio waves", had strange magnetic properties, or contained odd crystalline structures. According to skeptical investigator Joe Nickell, the "implants" Leir claimed to have discovered were most likely ordinary objects such as shards of glass or fragments of metal that become lodged in arms, hands, legs and feet due to accidental falls or barefoot walking. When asked to provide a forensic medical institute with specimens or photos for analysis, Leir's associate, Derrel Sims, refused.

Leir wrote The Aliens and the Scalpel in 1999, describing his “implant” surgery. His next book, Casebook: Alien Implants, was published in 2000. He began appearing on various radio and television shows, and spoke at UFO conferences. In 2001, a journalist visiting his office in Ventura, California reported that it contained UFO magazines and a shelf full of “bug-eyed alien dolls”. In 2003 he traveled to Varginha, Brazil to investigate the alleged crash of an alien spacecraft, and produced a book in 2005 titled UFO Crash in Brazil.

Dr. Leir wrote "The Smoking Gun" article for Un-X News Magazine which was published on March 2, 2014, just days before his death. Leir told the publisher that it was the most detailed article he had written to date.{{https://un-xnews.blogspot.com/2020/11/the-smoking-gun-by-dr-roger-leir.html?m=1 }|date=April 2021}}

== Death ==
Leir died six days before his 79th birthday on March 14, 2014. The cause of death was determined as a heart attack.
