= Varginha Airport =

Major-Brigadeiro Trompowsky Airport Aeroporto Major-Brigadeiro Trompowsky
- IATA: VAG; ICAO: SBVG; LID: MG0019

Summary
- Airport type: Public
- Serves: Varginha
- Time zone: BRT (UTC−03:00)
- Elevation AMSL: 922 m (3,025 ft)
- Coordinates: 21°35′20″S 045°28′24″W

Map
- Location in Brazil VAG (Brazil)

Runways
Direction	Length		Surface
Direction	m	ft	Surface
04/22	2,100	6,890	Asphalt
- Sources: ANAC, DECEA

Major-Brigadeiro Trompowsky Airport (IATA: VAG, ICAO: SBVG) is the airport serving Varginha, Brazil. The airport is named after Armando Figueira Trompowsky de Almeida (1889–1964) former Minister of the Brazilian Air Force.

== Airlines and destinations ==
Airlines	Destinations
Azul Conecta	Belo Horizonte–Confins

== Access ==
The airport is located 8 km (5 mi) from downtown Varginha.

== See also ==
- List of airports in Brazil
