= Alien implants =

Ufology subject

In ufology, alien implants are alleged physical objects claimed to have been surgically placed in the bodies of purported alien abductees. The reported capabilities of such implants have included telepresence, mind control, and a form of biotelemetry analogous to humans tagging wild animals for study. As with UFO subjects in general, the idea of "alien implants" has seen very little attention from mainstream scientists.

== History ==
According to Peter Rogerson writing in Magonia magazine, the earliest mention of alien implants can be traced to a March 1957 Long John Nebel radio show interview with ufologist John Robinson, where Robinson recounted a neighbor's claim of being kidnapped by aliens in 1938 and kept subdued by "small earphones" placed behind his ears.

Massachusetts resident Betty Andreasson claimed that aliens had implanted a device in her nose during her supposed abduction in 1967, first publicized by Raymond E. Fowler in his book The Andreasson Affair. A Canadian woman named Dorothy Wallis described a similar experience in 1983. In later years, the claims of authors like Whitley Strieber would further popularize commonly reported patterns of alien abductions in general, including the topic of unusual "implants" associated with such alleged encounters. John E. Mack wrote in his book Abduction: Human Encounters With Aliens that he examined a "thin, wiry object" that was 0.5 to 0.75 inches (13 to 19 mm) in length, given to him by a 24-year-old female client who stated that it came out of her nose following an abduction experience. California podiatrist Roger Leir also claimed to have removed implants from patients.

According to skeptical investigator Joe Nickell, the supposed implants appear to be ordinary materials such as shards of glass, jagged pieces of metal, and carbon fibers. The objects are often found lodged in extremities such as toes, hands, and shins. Nickell cites Kaplan Medical Center department head Virgil Priscu's opinion that there's "No mystery, no implants", explaining that normal objects picked up during a fall or by walking barefoot often become surrounded by scar tissue.

== Popular culture ==
Alien implants, pictured as small needles inserted into victims' necks and stomachs, first appeared in the 1953 film Invaders from Mars.

== See also ==
- Matchbox sign, a similar phenomenon related to delusional parasitosis.
