= Barzolff =

Visual artist

- Born: David Nicolas; 1973 (age 52–53); Paris, France
- Occupations: Graphic artist; graffiti artist

David Nicolas (born 1973) or Barzolff, is a French-American visual artist, graffiti artist, and computer animation artist and graphic designer. His specialty is surreal paintings of humans. He became known on YouTube for his animated videos depicting flying saucers flying over islands such as Haiti. The videos and their authenticity were questioned due to the advanced graphics.

== Biography and career ==
He was a local graffiti artist under the name Numéro 6 and studied visual arts and animation.

He created two videos on YouTube of UFOs flying. These videos went viral online and many questioned their authenticity including Los Angeles Times. He confirmed the videos were created by him.

His video "UFO Haiti" has 20 million views on YouTube.

In 2011, he moved from Burgundy to Los Angeles and held an exhibit, Write A Book About What? It was held at Pacific Design Center.
