= Colares, Pará =

Colares
- Location of Colares
- Coordinates: 00°56′13″S 48°16′55″W
- Country: Brazil
- Region: Norte
- State: Pará

Government
  - Mayor: Ivanito Monteiro Goncalves

Area
  - Total: 609.776 km^{2} (235.436 sq mi)

Population (2020)
  - Total: 12,131
  - Density: 20.2/km^{2} (52/sq mi)
- Time zone: UTC−3 (BRT)

Colares is a municipality in the north part of Pará, Brazil. The island became famous because of the Colares UFO flap, which later originated the Operação Prato.

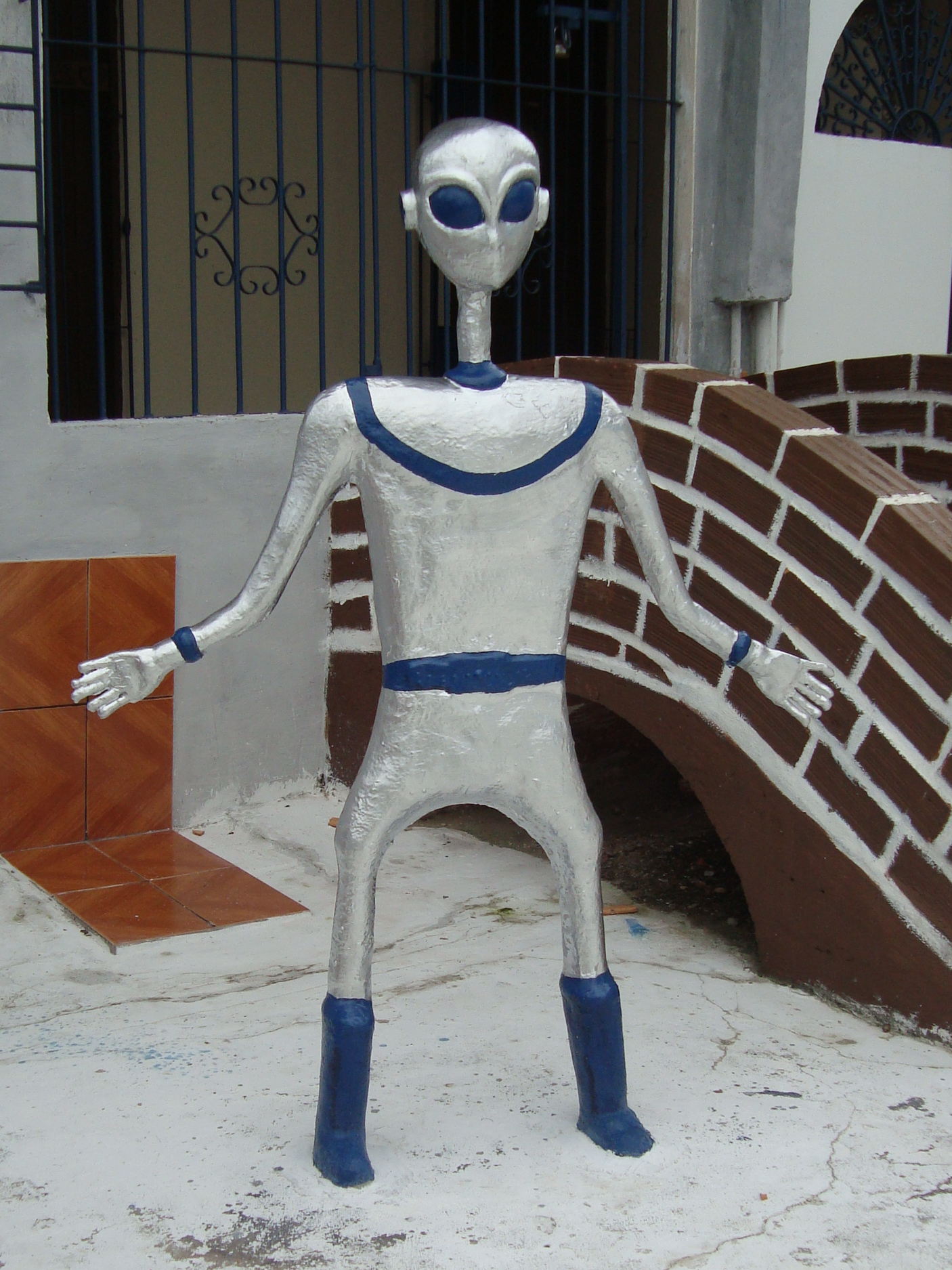
Many restaurants on Colares show images that refer to the UFO flap
