= Campo Largo, Paraná =

Campo Largo
- Municipality
- Municipality of Campo Largo
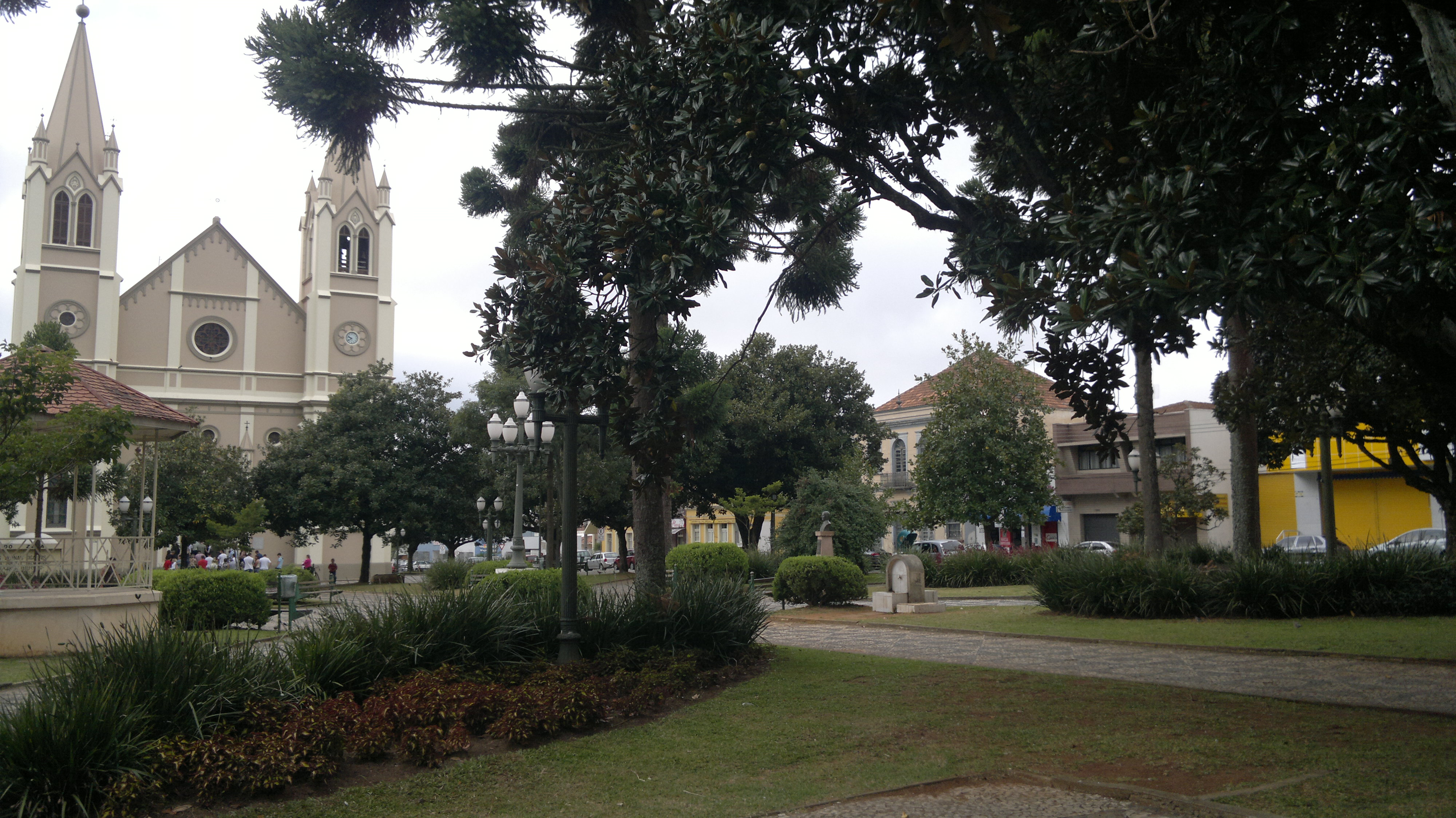
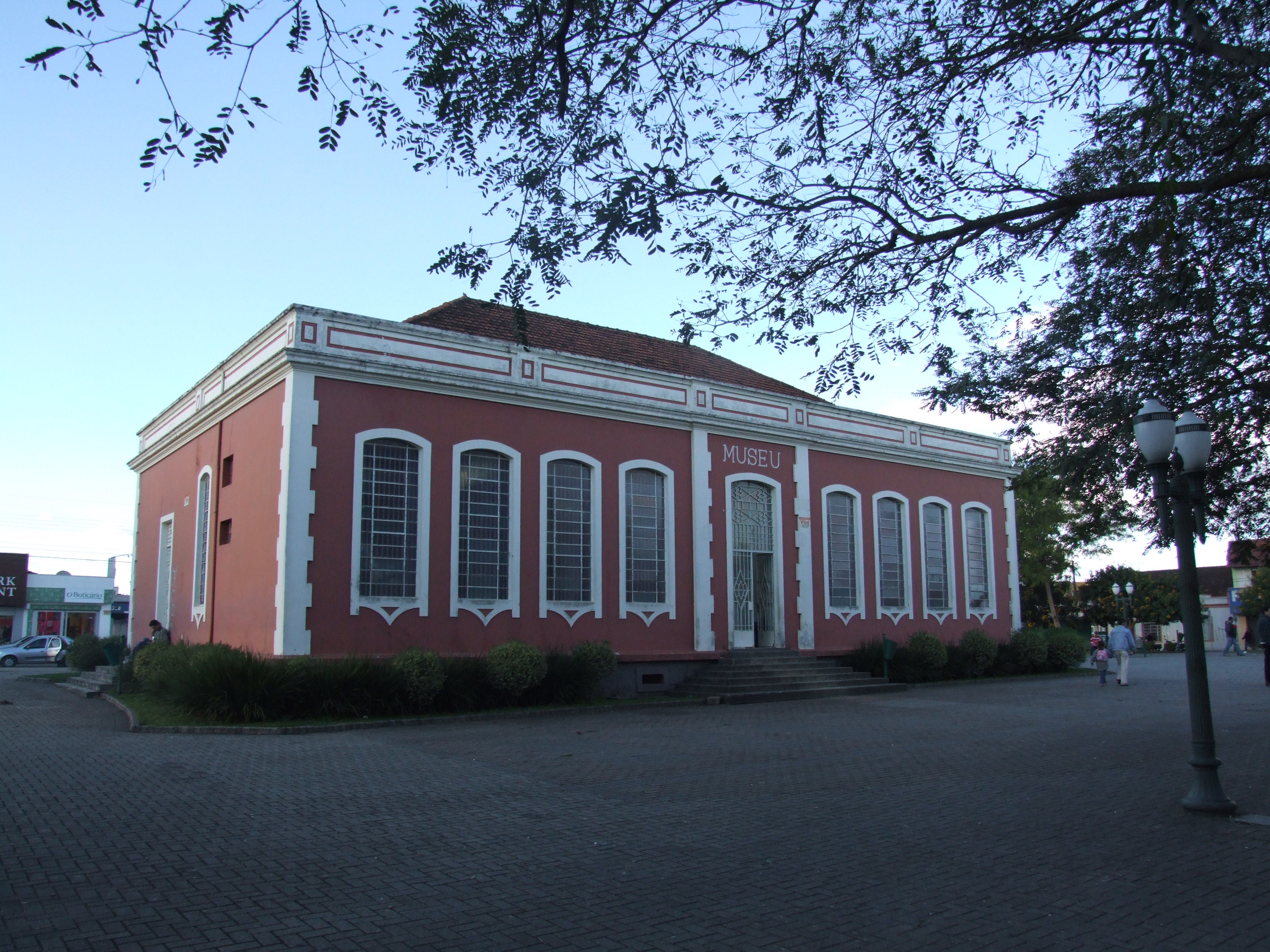
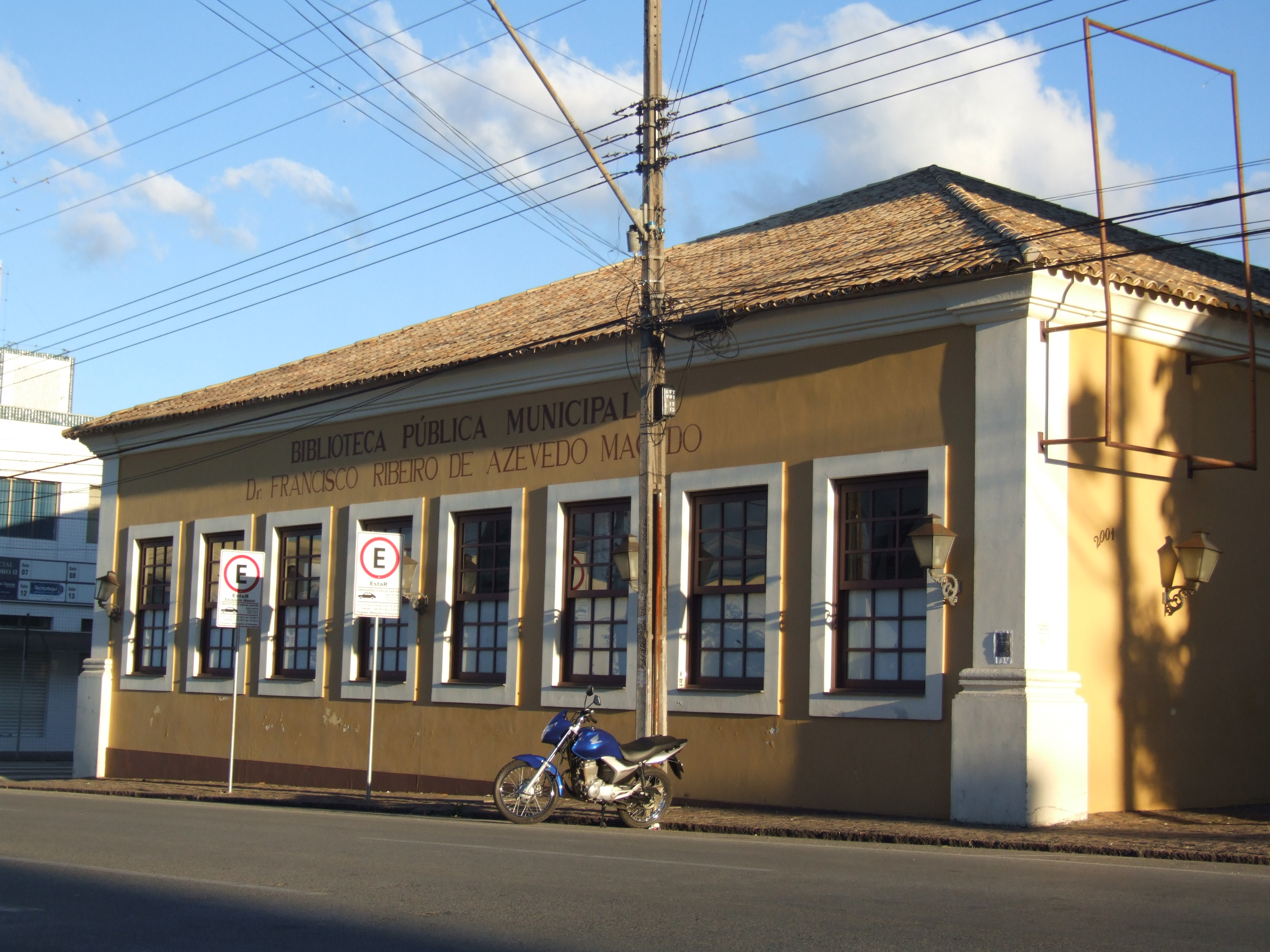
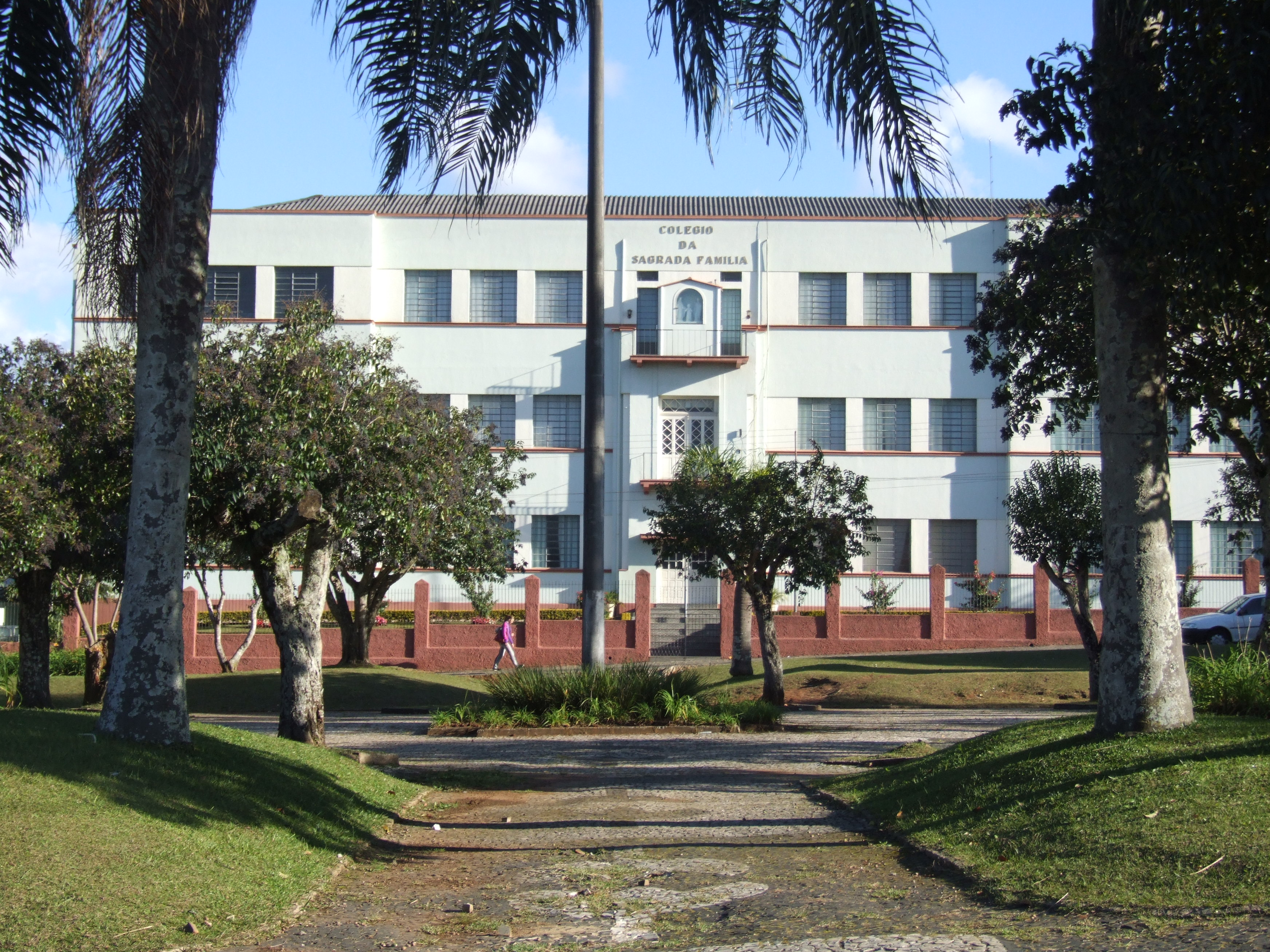
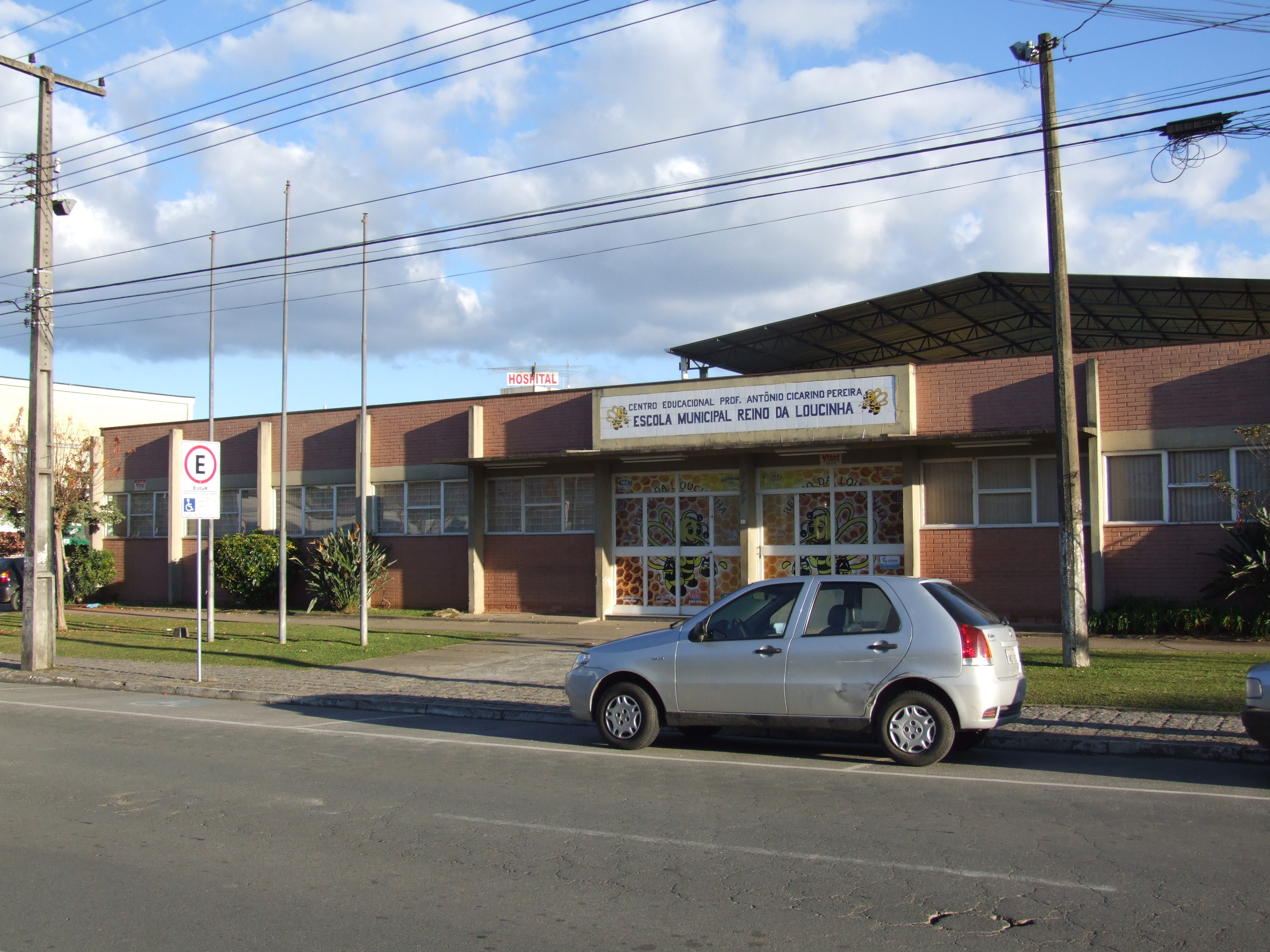

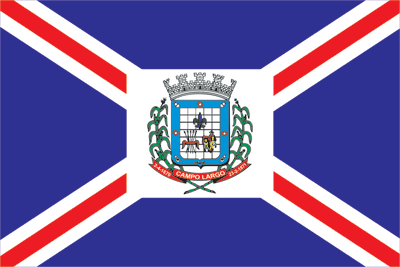
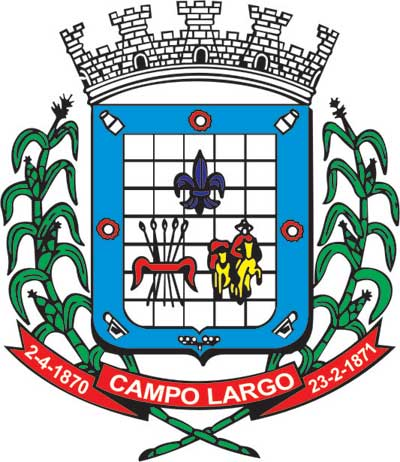
- Flag Coat of arms
- Nickname: Capital da louça ("The porcelain capital")
- Location in the Paraná
- Coordinates: 25°27′32″S 49°31′40″W
- Country: Brazil
- Region: South
- State: Paraná
- Founded: April 2, 1870
- Incorporated: February 23, 1871

Government
  - Mayor: Edson Basso (PSDB)

Area
  - Total: 1,243.552 km^{2} (480.138 sq mi)
- Elevation: 956 m (3,136 ft)

Population (2022 Census)
  - Total: 136,327
  - Estimate (2025): 144,504
  - Density: 109.627/km^{2} (283.933/sq mi)
- Time zone: UTC−3 (BRT)
- CEP: 80000-000 to 82999-999
- Area code: +55 41
- HDI (2010): 0.745 – high
- Website: campolargo.atende.net

Campo Largo is a municipality in Paraná, Brazil. The inhabitants are known in Brazil as campolarguense. It is also a near suburb of Curitiba. The town is best known for its large product of porcelain. It is headquarters to companies such as: 'Incepa', 'Porcelana Schmidt', 'Germer', 'Lorenzetti'. 'Ouro Fino' mineral water also comes from this town.

According to IBGE (Brazilian Institute of Geography and Statistics) Census from 2022, its population was 136,327, making it the 14th most populous city in Paraná and the 4th most populous in its microregion. The native inhabitants of the municipality of Campo Largo are called Campo-Larguenses (people from Campo Largo). The city of Campo Largo was separated from Curitiba in the 1870s. The municipality comprises the districts of Bateias, Três Córregos, São Silvestre, and Ferraria, and is subdivided into 147 neighborhoods, subdivisions, and residential areas. The etymology suggests that the name has a geographical origin and denotes the vastness of the region's horizons at the time of the municipality's founding, although its lands were then nothing more than a pine forest.

== History ==
The gold rush on Paraná in the middle of 16th century was the main reason to the first settlements which gives origin to the city. Gold extraction was followed by cattle and stop points to explorers on the way to São Paulo.

Colonization was made by the original Brazilian population of that time, mainly Portuguese and Africans, in combination with the recent immigration wave of European immigrants, mainly from Poland, Italy and Germany, which were attracted by the Brazilian government incentives and the temperate climate preferring to immigrate instead of continuing in a Europe devastated by poverty and religious prosecutions.

== Climate ==
In Campo Largo, the climate is classified as oceanic climate (Cfb), according to the Köppen climate classification.
