= Varginha =

- Municipality
- Municipality of Varginha
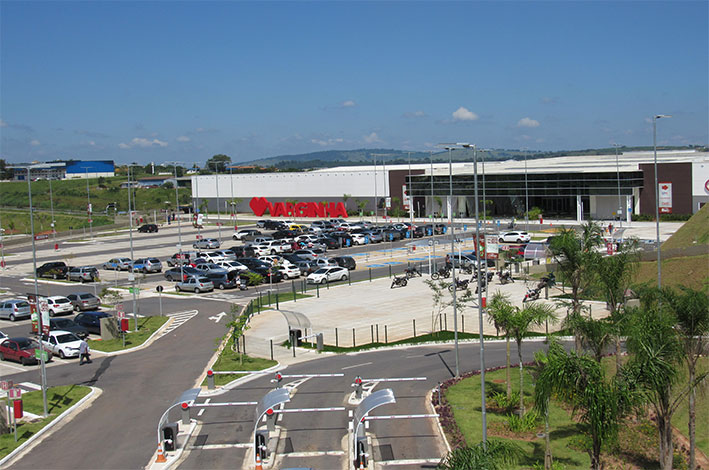

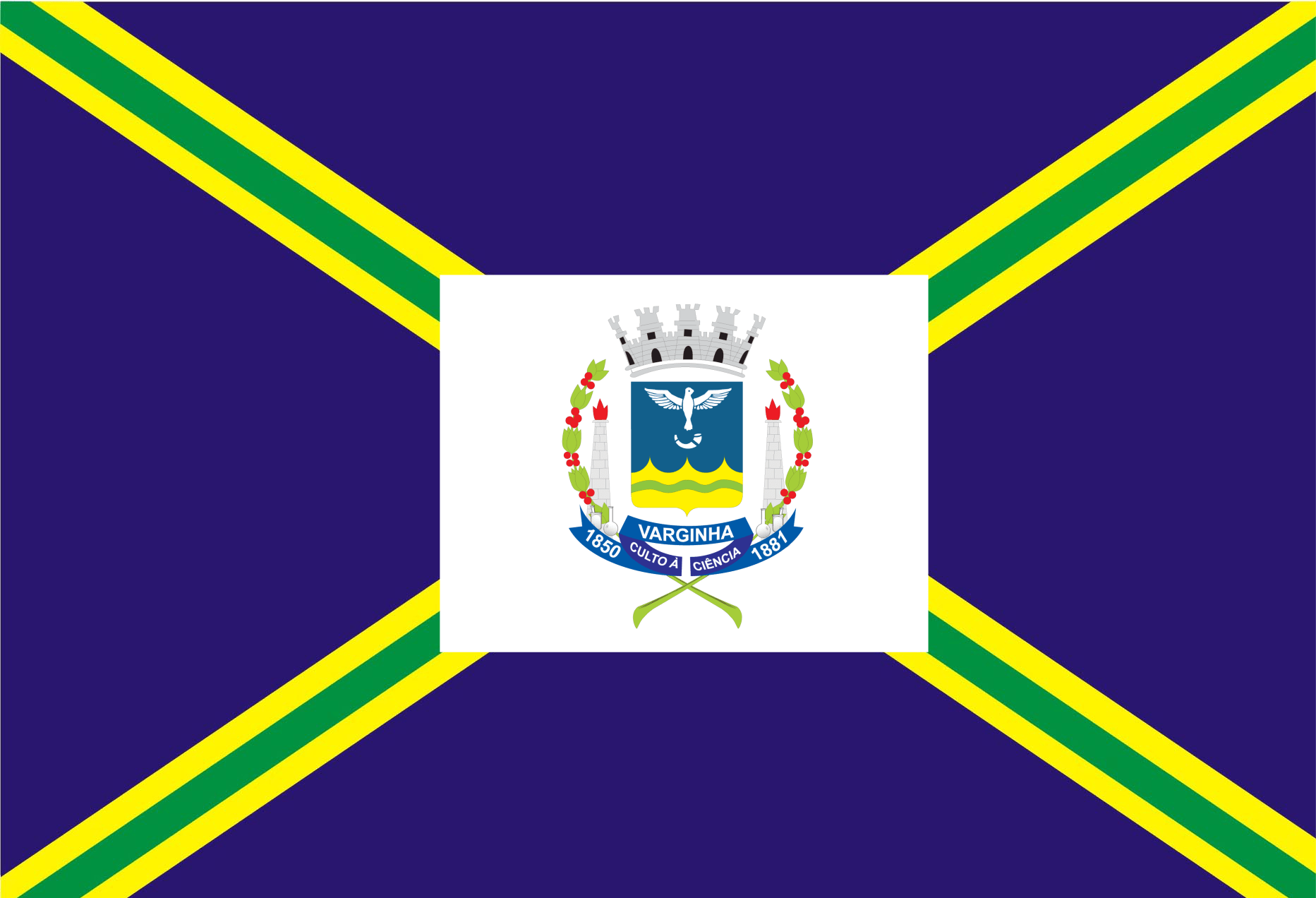
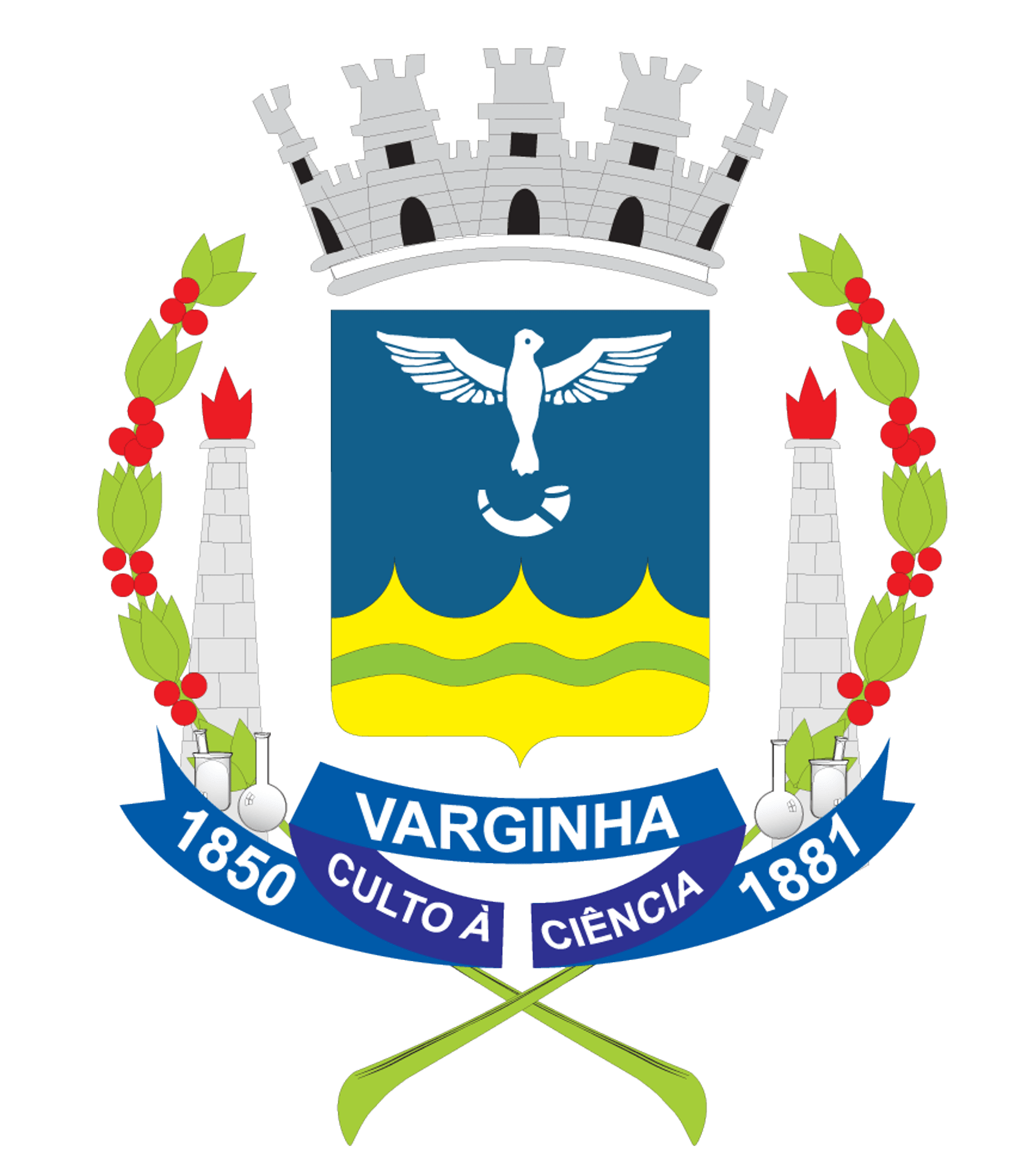
- Flag Coat of arms

- City location in Minas Gerais

- Location within Brazil
- Coordinates: 21°33′06″S 45°25′48″W
- Country: Brazil
- Region: Southeast
- State: Minas Gerais

Government
  - Mayor: Leonardo Ciacci (PSD)

Area
  - Total: 395.647 km^{2} (152.760 sq mi)
- Elevation: 980 m (3,220 ft)

Population (2022 Census)
  - Total: 136,467
  - Estimate (2025): 143,676
  - Density: 314.7/km^{2} (815/sq mi)
- Time zone: UTC−3 (BRT)
- HDI (2010): 0.778 – high
- Website: www.varginha.mg.gov.br

Varginha (Brazilian Portuguese pronunciation: [vaʁˈʒĩ.ɲɐ]) is a municipality in southwest Minas Gerais state, Brazil. Varginha stands out as one of the major centers of commerce and coffee production in Brazil and the world. The city is a center for export of coffee draining most of the production of the south of Minas Gerais, making the grain trade with several countries. The city is equidistant from the three largest metropolitan areas in Brazil (Belo Horizonte, Rio de Janeiro and São Paulo). The city is close to Rodovia Fernão Dias. The city is served by Maj. Brig. Trompowsky Airport (IATA: VAG, ICAO: SBVG).

Varginha achieved moderate fame in UFO circles due to the so-called Varginha UFO incident in 1996, in which two extraterrestrial beings were allegedly spotted by locals and later captured by the Brazilian Army, along with the local police and fire department. After this episode, the city began to invest in "UFO tourism". Today there are bus stops with the shape of spaceships and a water tower downtown also in the shape of a spaceship. In August 2004, UFO researchers from all over Brazil came together at the UFO Congress of Varginha, organized with the support of the City Hall.

== Geography ==
According to the modern (2017) geographic classification by Brazil's National Institute of Geography and Statistics (IBGE), the city is the main municipality in the Intermediate Geographic Region of Varginha.

=== Distances to cities ===
- São Paulo – 316 km (196 mi)
- São Paulo–Guarulhos International Airport – 305 km (190 mi)
- Rio de Janeiro – 390 km (240 mi)
- Belo Horizonte – 315 km (196 mi)
- Campinas – 311 km (193 mi)
- Viracopos International Airport – 325 km (202 mi)
- Santos – 379 km (235 mi)
- Juiz de Fora – 310 km (190 mi)
- Pouso Alegre – 120 km (75 mi)
- Ribeirão Preto – 320 km (200 mi)

== History ==
The colonization of southern Minas Gerais began in the 17th century, when the region still belonged to the Captaincy of São Paulo.

The bandeirantes coming from São Paulo via the Paraíba Valley crossed the Mantiqueira mountain range in the region of the Embaú gorge, today's Passa Quatro. Among the São Paulo bandeirantes, the first and foremost was Fernão Dias Pais Leme, who explored the region and headed north into the backlands in search of the indigenous legend of Sabarabuçu. The bandeirantes, who were in search of precious stones and gold regions, passed through the region along the banks of the Rio Verde and Rio Grande, making one of their first points of support near the present-day town of Baependi.

Many São Paulo traders (tropeiros) also passed through the region frequently, selling products from São Paulo and Portugal. These traders traveled in troops and slept in huts built every six leagues. The current Vargem neighborhood was one of these resting places.

The first known documents about the history of Varginha date back to 1780.

The muleteers, who were passing through Varginha on a regular basis, built a small chapel in 1785, close to where the Divine Holy Spirit parish church now stands. In 1806, the chapel of the Divine Holy Spirit of Catanduvas was built and, in the same year, the land required for the district estate was donated. The town was then given the name of Catanduvas or Catandubas; a word originally from the Tupi language, meaning "undergrowth, closed, rough and thorny, of small size". Because of the chapel's patron saint, it was renamed Espírito Santo das Catanduvas.

With the expansion of coffee-growing around 1870 in the states of São Paulo and Rio de Janeiro, the southern region of Minas Gerais also began growing coffee on its farms, which was highly profitable and made many of the region's producers rich.

In order to meet the need for an alternative labor force to slavery, since there were no more slaves due to the abolition of slavery, the Brazilian government made an agreement with Italy, in which many Italians came to Brazil with their expenses paid by the Brazilian government; in return, the Italians had to work for a certain period of time in coffee production, receiving a certain percentage of the production.

Varginha was one of the municipalities that received the most Italian immigrants in Brazil during this period. With enormous commitment and hard work, many Italians went on to buy their own land and start their own businesses, which generated great economic development for Varginha and the south of Minas Gerais at the end of the 19th century and the beginning of the 20th century.

The Italians spread trade and founded the wheat mill, now Moinho Sul Mineiro, in partnership with Varginhenses of the time. The construction of the Theatro Capitólio, which follows the Tolentino style and whose decoration is attributed to the Italian Alexandre Vallati, is also attributed to the Italian colony.

At the beginning of the 20th century, the small town of Varginha already had many coffee processing establishments. The product has always been an important factor in the region's development, mainly due to the strong influence of São Paulo in the area.

Another considerable influx was that of Syrian-Lebanese immigrants in the early decades of the 20th century, most of whom made their living in the produce trade in São Paulo.

During the Second World War, Varginha sent reinforcements to join the Brazilian troops fighting in Italy. This was an unusual move by the Brazilian government, since many of the soldiers known as "pracinhas", who left Varginha and other regions of Brazil, had direct relatives such as uncles and grandparents in the country to which they were sent to fight.

In the 1970s, Varginha also received several Japanese families, who immigrated as a result of the Japanese acquisition of a German company at the time, CBC, which had a factory in the city.

Nowadays, due to the transfer of Taiwanese companies to the region, the city hosts Taiwanese immigrants, who invest, create jobs and work in Varginha.

== Economy ==
Varginha is a major regional hub for services and industries. Several factories are established in the city such as Philips-Walita, Inovacon, Plascar, Cooper-Standard, SteamMaster and Samsung. There are also a large number of small enterprises in the industrial sector with regional success. It is also one of the biggest producers of coffee in the world.

The city's main economy sectors are agriculture (especially coffee), engineering, steel, car parts and metal-mechanics.

Varginha has the biggest GDP in the southern region of Minas Gerais, a prosperous area with a high HDI and close to big economy centers in the state of São Paulo. The city was ranked 7th by Veja Magazine for the Top 20 mid-size cities to invest and live in Brazil.

Opened in 2012, the CIT-Centro Industrial Tecnológico (portuguese for Industrial and technological center) is a new industrial complex in the city's airport area and its home for the Porto Seco Sul de Minas (South Minas Dry Port), an imports/exports company for the city's coffee industry.

Its location is considered one of the best for the logistics and transportation industries, close to Brazil's biggest economy centers.

== Gallery ==
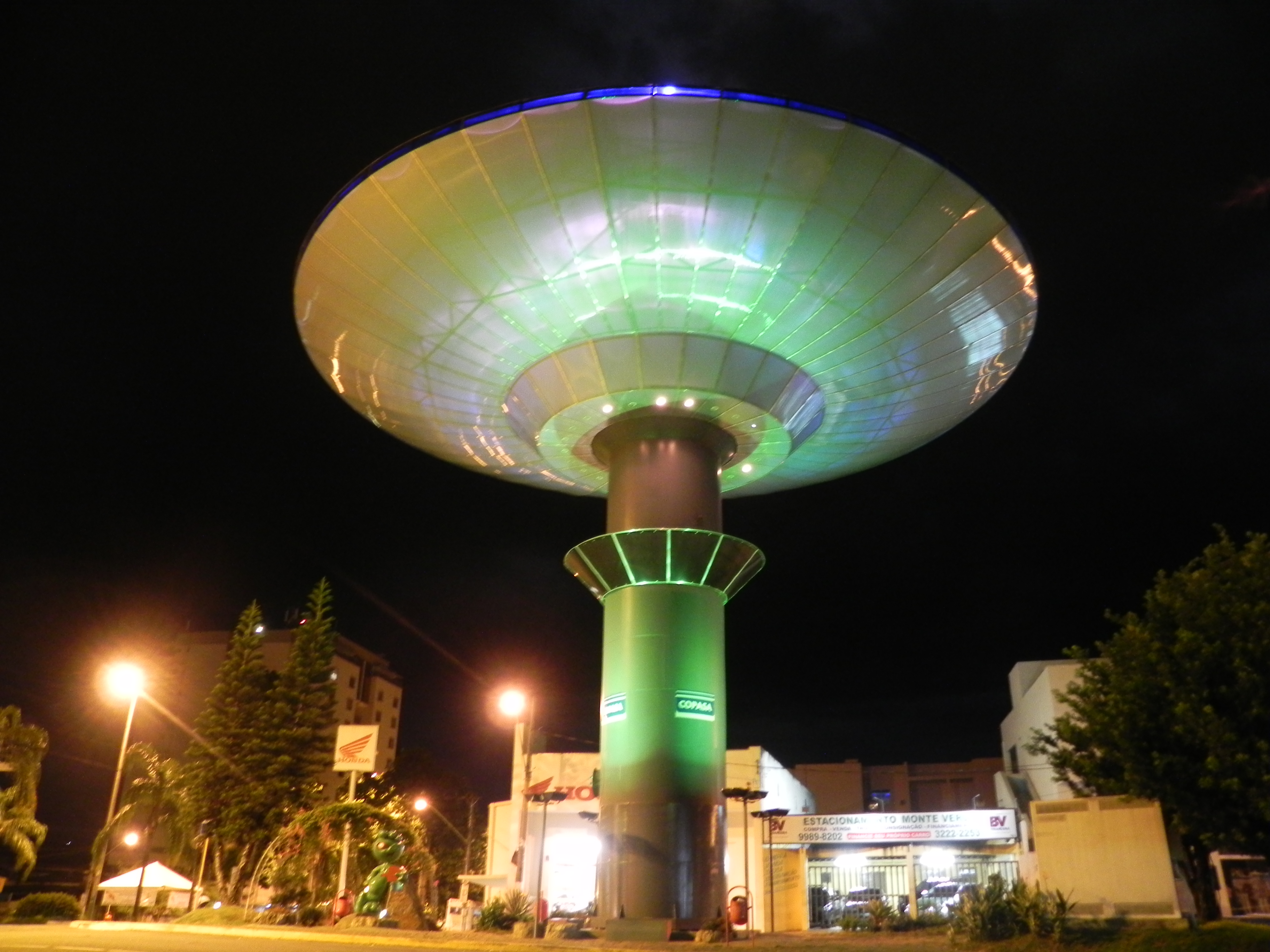
Illuminated spaceship

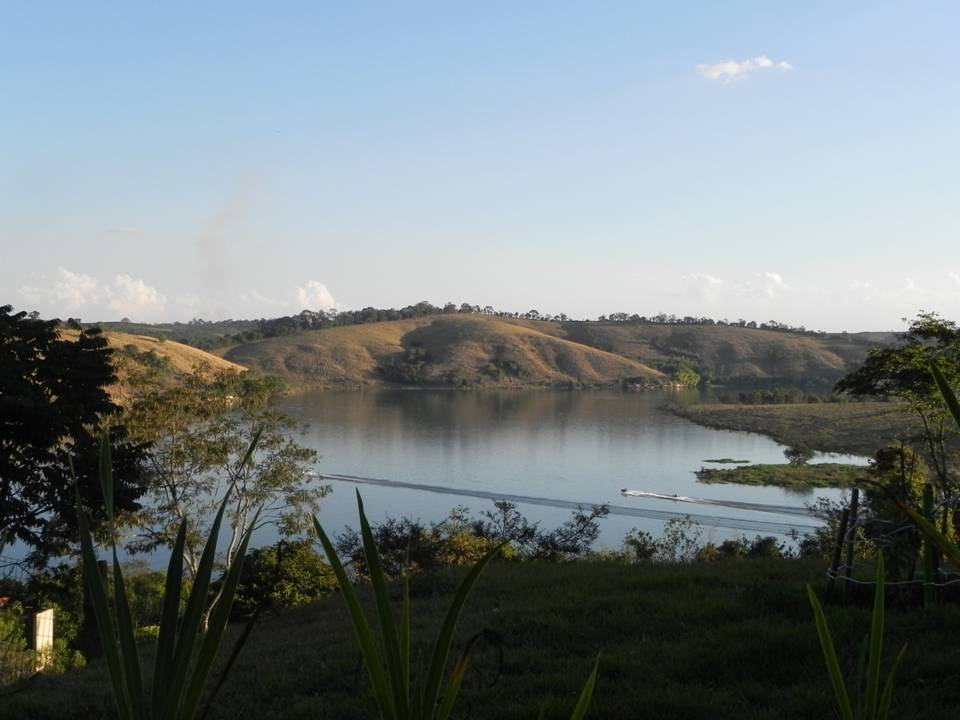
Furnas Lake

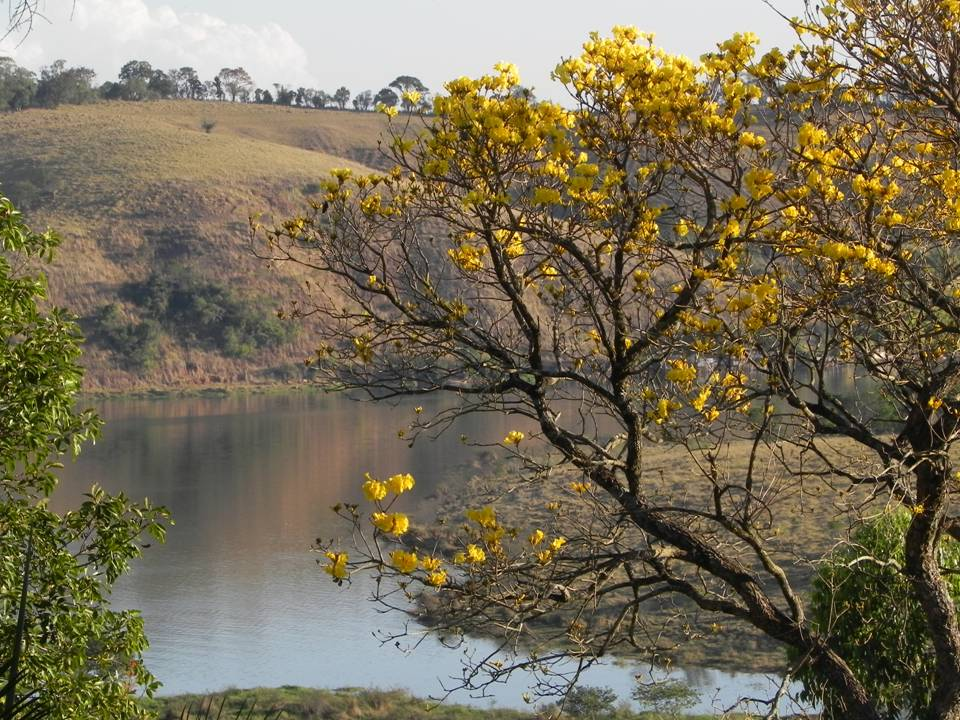
Yellow blossoms at Furnas Lake

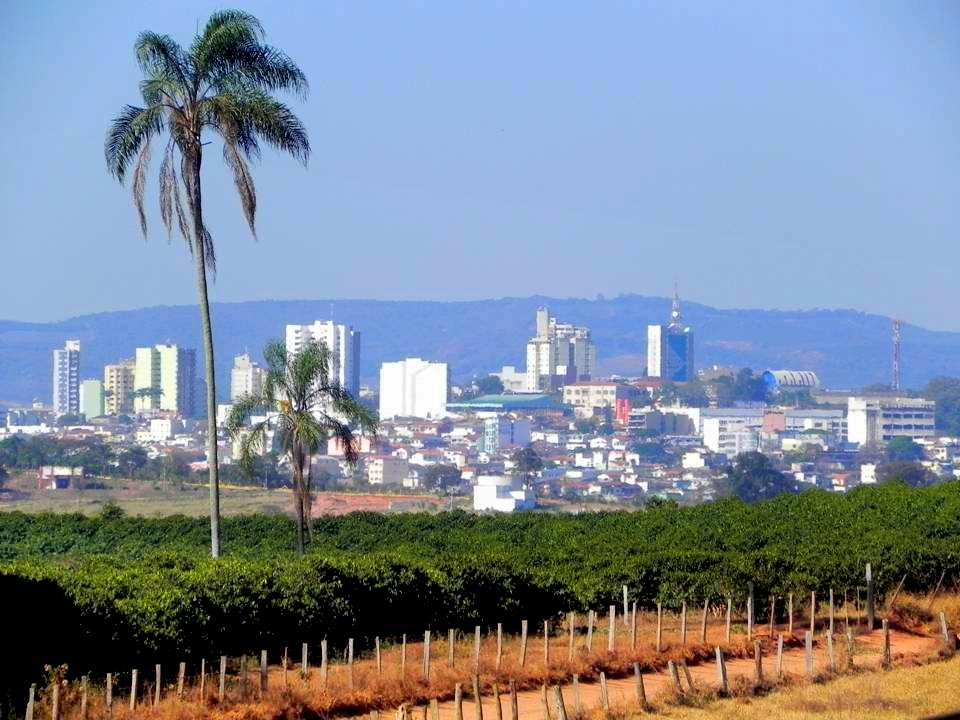
Coffee plantation

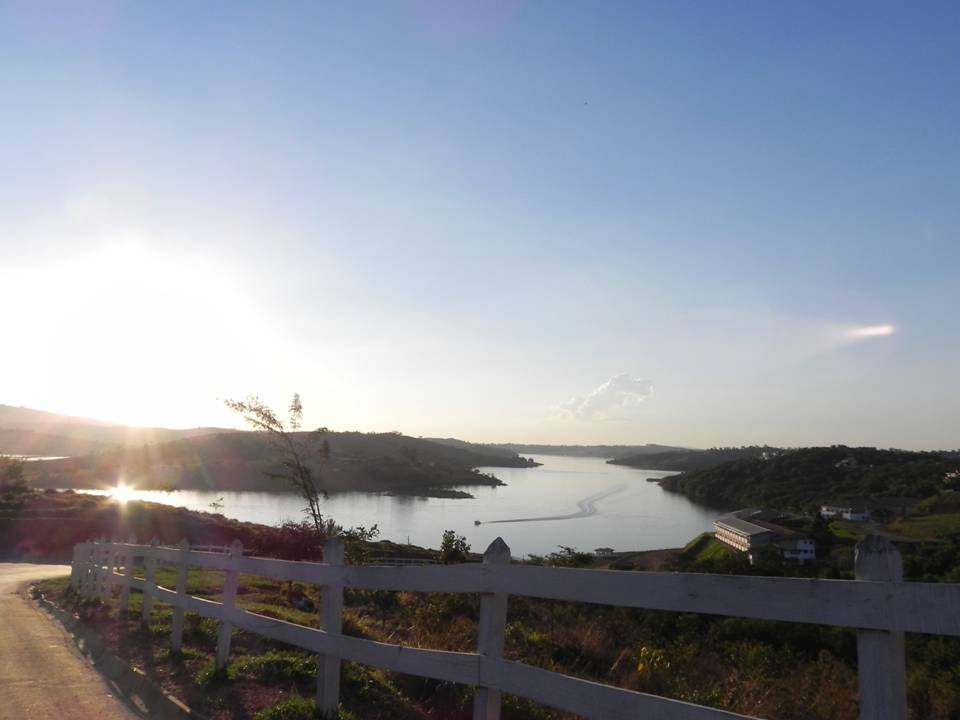
Marina and Resort

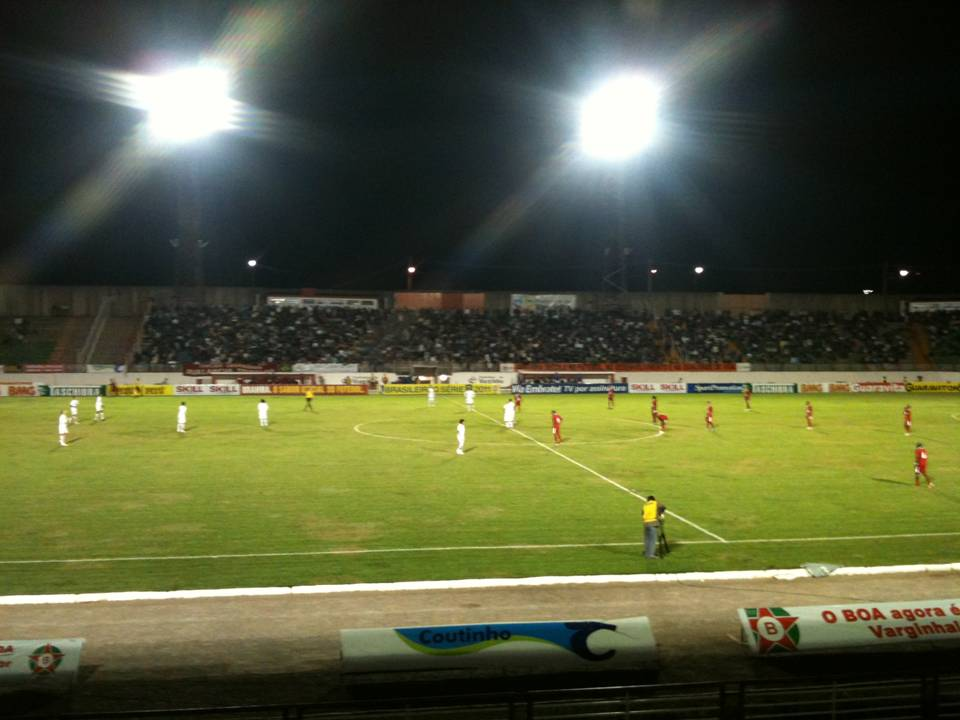
Football game

== See also ==
- List of municipalities in Minas Gerais
- Varginha UFO incident
