= Rhodes UFO photographs =

UFO photographs taken in 1947 by William A. Rhodes

Coordinates: 33.498843°N 112.051887°W

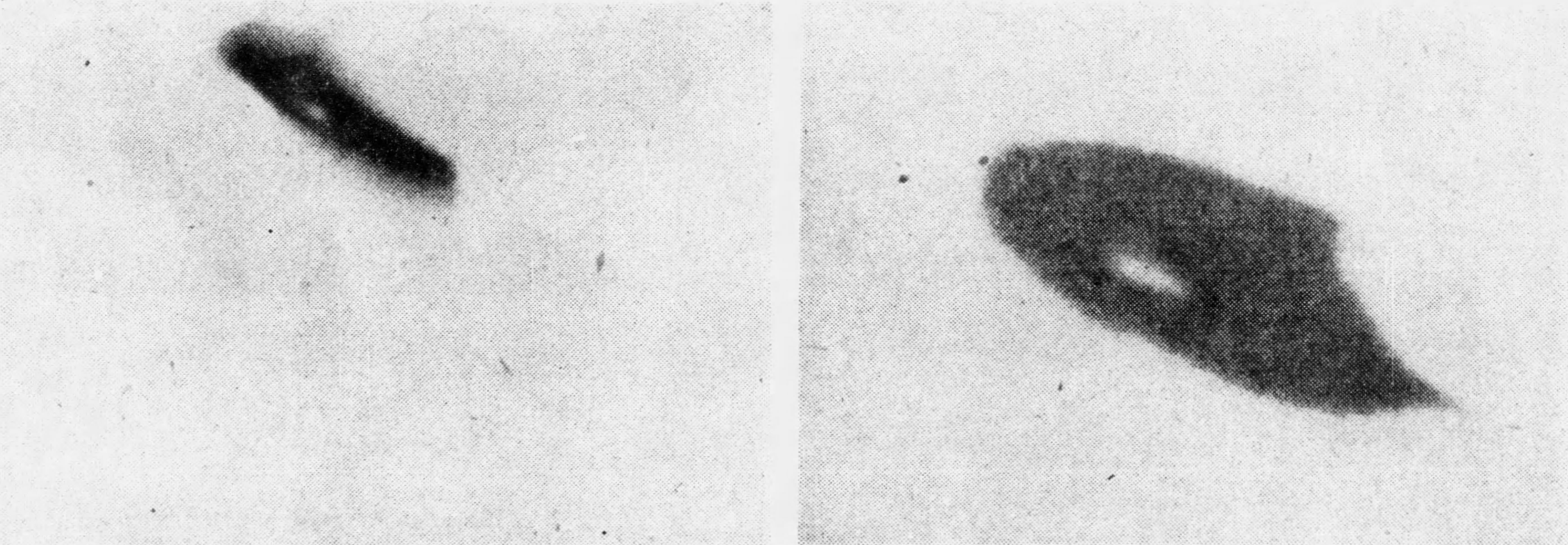
The Rhodes UFO photographs

The Rhodes UFO photographs, sometimes called the shoe-heel UFO photographs, purport to show a disc-like object flying above Phoenix, Arizona, United States. The two photographs were reportedly taken on July 7, 1947, by amateur astronomer and inventor William Albert Rhodes. They were printed in the newspaper The Arizona Republic on July 9, along with Rhodes's account of his sighting of the object. Published near the end of the 1947 flying disc craze, the photographs were among the first showing an unidentified flying object. Discussion by commentators has continued into the 21st century.

== Background ==
On June 24, 1947, civilian pilot Kenneth Arnold reported that he had seen nine objects flying over Washington State. From his description of the objects, the press invented the term flying saucers. By June 27, airborne objects were being reported nationwide. Sightings began occurring in Arizona by the second week of July. The Arizona Republic published a story on July 7 about Tempe resident Francis Howell, who reported seeing a "circular object about two feet [60 cm] in diameter floating to the earth" near his home. According to Howell, when he approached the object, it "slowly went into the air at a 45-degree angle headed in the direction of Phoenix". On July 8, the same newspaper reported two "silvery balls" in the skies north of Phoenix. The paper stated that the objects were "estimated to be about twice as large as an airplane".

== Publication ==
On July 9, 1947, the front page of The Arizona Republic featured Rhodes's photographs under the headline "Mystery 'Whatsis' Photographed over Phoenix". The newspaper characterized the object depicted in the photographs as "the shape of a heel of a shoe, with a small hole in the center". The accompanying article described Rhodes as an amateur radio operator and a model airplane manufacturer, who was lauded in the model aircraft community for advances in radio control. The newspaper recounted that Rhodes was walking to his home workshop when he heard a loud "whoosh". He believed that it was from a jet-propelled Lockheed P-80. Rhodes grabbed a camera and took two photographs. He noted that after the initial "whoosh", the object was completely silent, and said that the object made three passes over his home and left two trails of vapor.

== Investigation ==
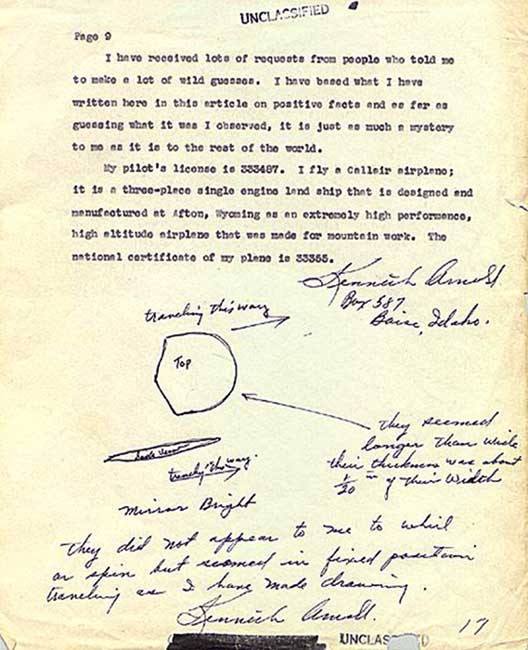
On July 12, 1947, Kenneth Arnold drew a crescent shape to describe the disc he claimed to have witnessed, June 24, 1947. (Note: "[Rhodes's] photographs were printed in a local newspaper and drew the attention of the FBI, who obtained his negatives and declared them to be genuine photographs, though of what, we don't know. Perhaps it was the heel of a shoe, but it's a decent match to Arnold's own initial sketch of what he saw on 24 June, with a rounded front and straight sides meeting at a convex end.") According to Arnold, he was shown the Rhodes pictures and told they were considered possibly authentic.

Files released in 2015 detail the official investigation into Rhodes and his photographs. On July 8, the FBI obtained copies of the photographs from the managing editor of The Arizona Republic. On August 29, Rhodes was interviewed by special agent Brower of the FBI and George Fugate Jr. of the Army's Counterintelligence Corps at Hamilton Field. Rhodes gave the men photographs and negatives. Two Air Materiel Command officers visited Rhodes in Phoenix. Additionally, an agent had discovered that the science fiction magazine Amazing Stories, which of late had been including UFO reports submitted by readers, had printed a letter from Rhodes, in which he asked the magazine for advice on suing the government to get back his photographs and negatives. However, Rhodes had never made a request to the government for their return. As well, the report noted, Rhodes's "character and business affiliations are presently under investigation".

In 1949, the Air Force internally published its first secret study of UFOs, titled Analysis of Flying Object Incidents in the United States. The report included the Rhodes photographs. Project Blue Book designated the case "Incident 40".

=== Explanations ===
==== Windblown debris ====
The Air Force stated in a report that it had consulted four "expert photographers" about the Rhodes photographs, and they had "disagree[d] with each other as to the possibility of filming such an occurrence under the conditions described. Considering that the object was grey as described, and at a distance of 2000 feet [600 m], it seems unlikely that it would appear pure black on the print." The report also noted that Rhodes referred to himself as chief of staff of a laboratory, the specialties of which included photography; "Yet, the negative was carelessly cut and faultily developed. It is covered with streaks and over a period of six months, has faded very noticeably." Finally, the report stated that "Dr. Irving Langmuir studied subject photographs, and after learning of the prior passage of a thunderstorm, discounted the photographed object as being merely paper swept up by the winds. ... In view of the apparent character of the witness, the conclusion by Dr. Langmuir seems entirely probable."

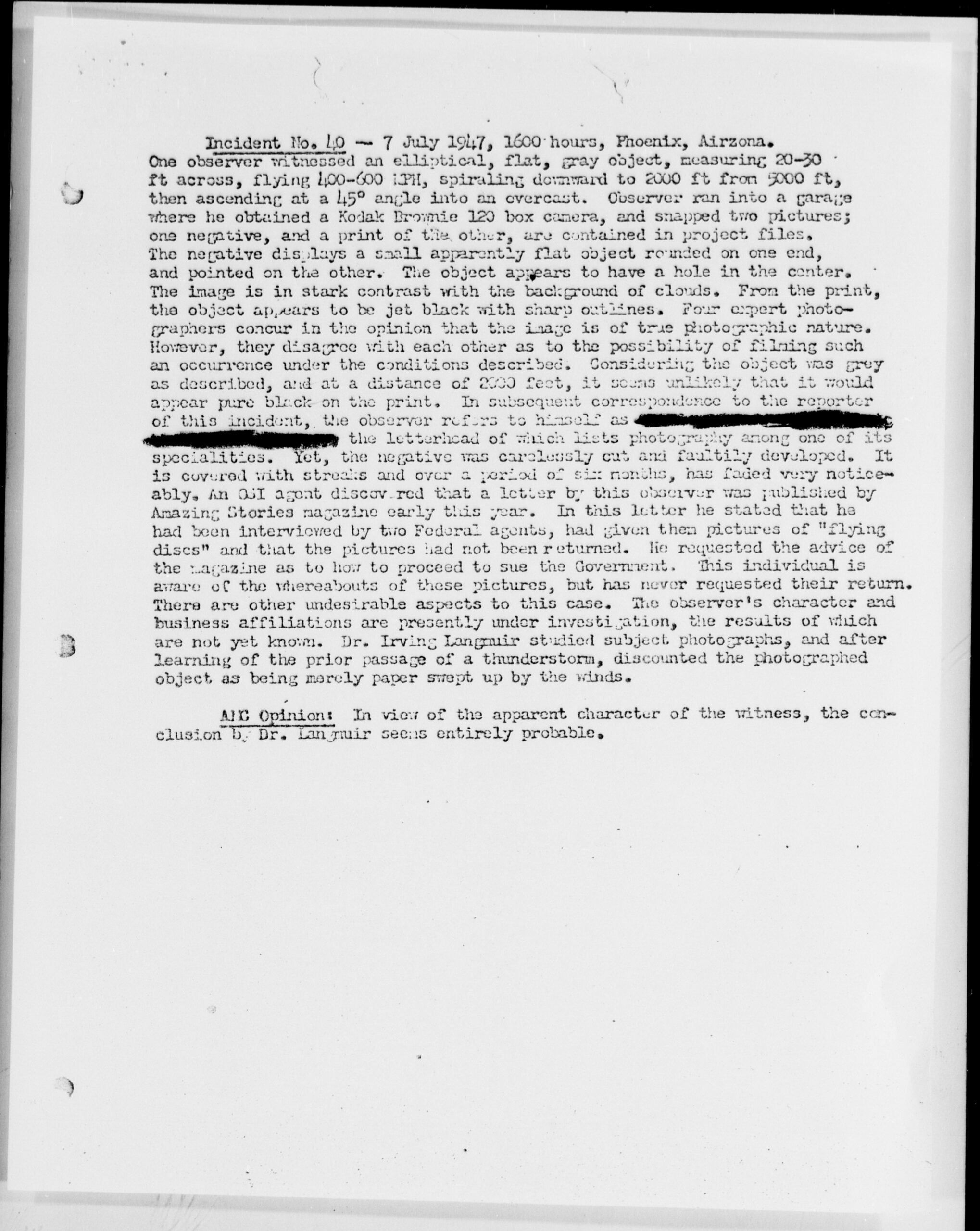
The Air Force concluded that the photographed object was likely windblown debris.

==== Potential hoax ====
On the same day that Rhodes claimed to have taken his photographs, it was reported that the FBI was investigating a letter received by the Los Angeles Examiner, asserting that the flying discs that had been widely sighted were atomic-powered Soviet craft. The newspaper had consulted a "top-flight atomic scientist", who assessed the letter as "not all nonsense", and recommended that it be given to authorities.

One historian argues that Rhodes faked his photographs, using the story of the Soviet craft as a model: "The similarities between the images in the Rhodes photographs and the touted Russian 'invention' are fairly marked. The alleged Russian device was said to be only 18 inches [46 cm] thick and of a kidney-shape outline with the pilot in a prone position while guiding its flight. Generally, this matches Rhodes' U-shaped object with the 'nonprotruding' canopy, thus was it an accident that the first good saucer photo compared so well with the supposed Communist design? This could confirm the Russian rumor, or it could mean Rhodes faked his story and pictures since the Soviet missive saw print the same day as the claimed Phoenix UFO flyby".

== Legacy ==
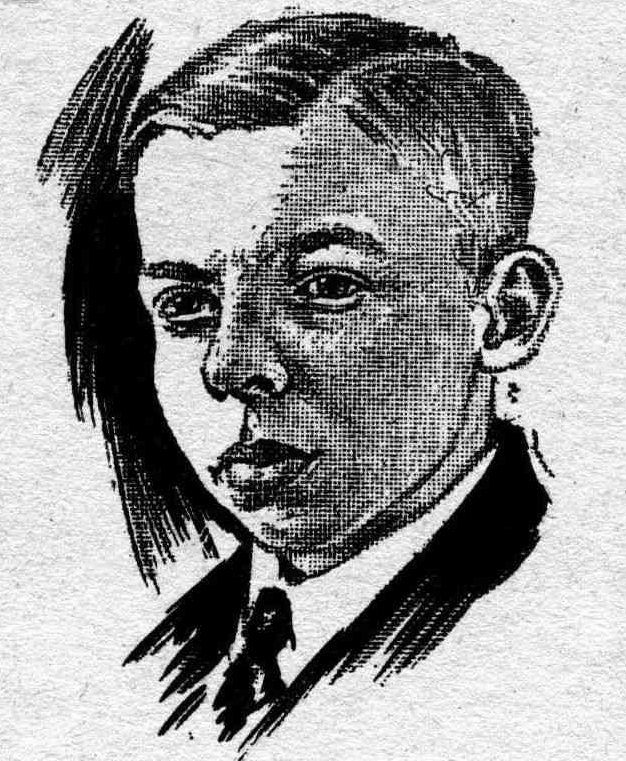
Raymond A. Palmer

Raymond A. Palmer was a magazine editor and publisher who first found success as editor of Amazing Stories, beginning in 1938. Palmer blended fact and fiction into a conspiracy theory, combining actual reports of UFOs with fictional stories, as epitomized by the Shaver Mystery. In the first issue of his magazine Fate, published during the spring of 1948, Palmer reprinted the Rhodes photographs, along with the text of the original article from The Arizona Republic. He cited the photographs, along with "a great many witnesses", as "proof positive that these objects were ... flying disks of an aeronautical design unrecognizable by experts". Palmer questioned the lack of subsequent reporting by other newspapers on the photographs, which he claimed "were the hottest news in the world" on the day that they were printed in The Arizona Republic.

Palmer continued to use the Rhodes photographs as evidence of his UFO theories, notably in The Coming of the Saucers, a 1952 book written by Palmer and original flying-saucer witness Arnold.

In a 1958 issue of Flying Saucers, yet another of Palmer's magazines, he claimed that attempts had been made by the government to suppress the Rhodes photographs, in part by recalling issues of The Arizona Republic containing them: "All the copies ... were seized by the army, in a house-to-house canvass, and all plates from the newspaper, plus the photo negatives and prints. The only known copy of the paper, plus duplicate negatives, prints from the original negatives, and statements of witnesses outside secret army files at the time were secured by Flying Saucers editor prior to the arrival of the army on the scene". Palmer was derided by Arizona Republic columnist Dan Dedera, who noted, "Circulation of three editions then was about 64,000 ... door-to-door army confiscation ... would have demanded the services of many army divisions".

The Riddle of the Flying Saucers, a 1950 book by Gerald Heard, discusses the Rhodes photographs.

In a 1952 article, an Arizona Republic reporter stated that he had sighted a flying disc in 1947 near White Sands, New Mexico, and later "was startled to see the tremendous likeness between what I had seen and the object photographed by William A. Rhodes".

Rhodes was interviewed in 1998 by KSAZ-TV. His photographs continued to be discussed by Arizona media into the 21st century.

== See also ==
- List of reported UFO sightings
- McMinnville UFO photographs (May 1950)
- Mariana UFO film (Aug 1950)
- Passaic UFO photographs (1952)
