= L. Taylor Hansen =

American writer (1897–1976)

- Born: Lucile Taylor Hansen; November 30, 1897
- Died: May 1976 (aged 78) Phoenix, Arizona, U.S.
- Occupation: Writer

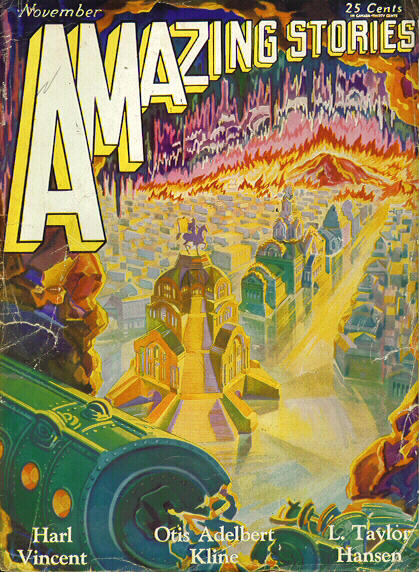
Hansen's "The Undersea Tube", her first published story, took the cover of the November 1929 issue of Amazing Stories

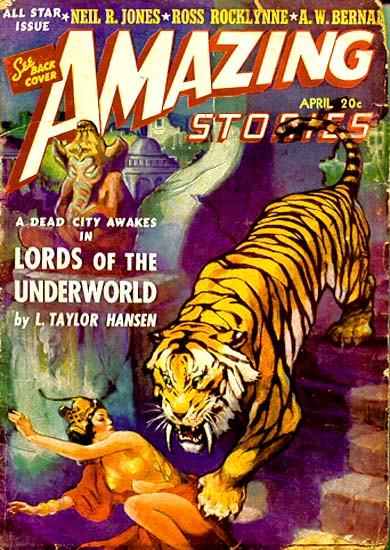
Hansen's novella "Lords of the Underworld" was the cover story in the April 1941 issue of Amazing Stories

Lucile Taylor Hansen (November 30, 1897 – May 1976) was an American writer of science fiction and popular science articles and books who used a male writing persona for the early part of her career when published as L. Taylor Hansen. She is the author of eight short stories, nearly sixty nonfiction articles popularizing anthropology and geology, and three nonfiction books.

== Early life ==
An autobiographical sketch by Hansen begins with her memory of staying with her parents in an abandoned fort after the "Indian Wars." In 1919, she writes, she was initiated into an Ojibwe tribe after she suggested to the tribe that they not kill the agency doctor but instead protest his appointment to Washington administrators. She then enters into a lifelong project to study of Native American legends.

She attended classes at the University of California, Los Angeles during the 1920s but did not receive a degree.

== Science ==
Starting with the September 1941 issue of Amazing, Hansen wrote "Scientific Mysteries", a regular column of non-fiction articles that continued until 1948. Combined with her other non-fiction articles, she wrote nearly sixty articles during this period, appearing from five to twelve times per year. Her first article picks up on the work of her father regarding continental drift. She reviews criticisms of the theory and presents evidence that supports it, such as geologic continuities and homologous species that appear on different continents. She presents a field of researchers working together so that "the veils of mystery are being pushed back from the library which is the past." Hansen credits this series of articles as being the start of her investigation of how the different stories of the Americas might have some common origins.

Hansen did not shy away from the controversial issues surrounding anthropology as the last vestiges of scientific racism fell away in the years before World War II. A July 1942 article, for instance, asserts that contemporary "standards of color are far too superficial". She points out that the skull shape of the Mayans, which would have supported the craniometric proposition that races differ culturally because of their distinctive skull geometries, does not "affect their intelligence". While she reports on findings that are now discredited, such as the idea that the population of Africa is a recently evolved type, she is remarkable for suggesting that Africans are not primitive but more evolved than other human types.

Later, Hansen began experimenting with pseudonyms. The article "America's Mysterious Race of Indian Giants" appeared in the December 1946 issue of Amazing, and while the writing style was "recognizable as that of columnist L. Taylor Hansen", it was credited to "Chief Sequoyah". A second story by Chief Sequoyah, "Spirit of the Serpent God", appeared in the June 1948 issue of Amazing. The story "The Fire-Trail", credited to a Navaho Oge-Make, appeared in the January 1948 issue of Amazing. She also credited a second story to Oge-Make, "Tribal Memories of the Flying Saucers", that appeared in another magazine Palmer edited, Fate, in the September 1949 issue.

As she completed her survey of Native American legends, Hansen published three nonfiction books. The first, Some Considerations of and Additions to the Taylor-Wegener Hypothesis of Continental Displacement (1946), details the elaboration of the continental drift theory proposed by Frank Bursley Taylor. Her second book, He Walked the Americas (1963), is a frequently cited taxonomy of Native American legends that report of a light-skinned prophet. Her last book, The Ancient Atlantic (1969), surveys the culture and geography of the Atlantic Ocean and touches on the legend of Atlantis.

Hansen wrote the book He Walked the Americas in 1963. In the book drawing from Native American legends, folklore and mythology discussed that a "White Prophet" had visited many different parts of America. Some Mormons have used this book as evidence supporting the Book of Mormon, which depicts Christianity practiced in the ancient Americas, including a visitation of the resurrected Jesus Christ.

== Science fiction ==
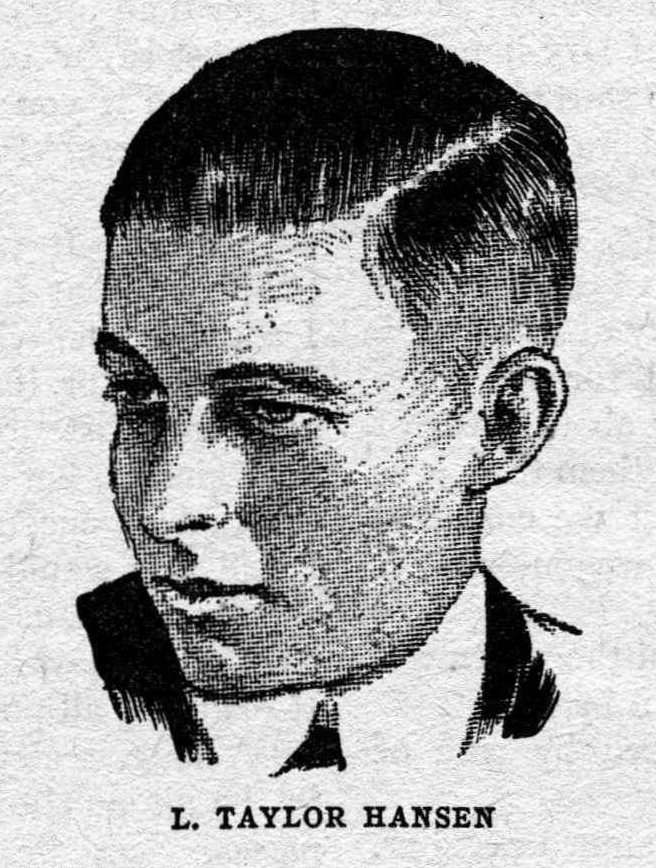
The image used to conceal Hansen's sex in Wonder Stories in 1930

While Hansen's science fiction career was brief, she was one of the first women in a genre dominated by male authors. Her first story, "What the Sodium Lines Revealed," appeared in Hugo Gernsback's Amazing Stories Quarterly in the Winter 1929 issue. This story, while a Gernsback-era adventure, hinges upon scientific ideas in that a message is detected in a spectrograph by an amateur astronomer. That same year, her second story "The Undersea Tube," details an underground civilization that is uncovered while developing a pneumatic commuter train between New York and Liverpool.

Eric Leif Davin reports that L. Taylor Hansen was apparently the only female science fiction author of the era who actively concealed her sex. The subterfuge was extensive. An illustration of a young man, purportedly Hansen, appeared with Hansen's fifth story, "The City on the Cloud." Hansen continued the subterfuge by asserting on the telephone to fan Forrest J. Ackerman that she was not the author of her stories but only handled them for her brother. Jane Donawerth suggests that Hansen's creation of a world-traveled, male brother was a "probably social crisis" in that she did not want to violate the convention of a male narrator in science fiction and so her persona allows her to "protect herself from social disapproval."

However, as reported by Davin, the facts of the encounter between Ackerman and Hansen are somewhat contradictory. A letter from Hansen was titled "L. Taylor Hansen Defends Himself" in the July 1943 issue of Amazing Stories, but Davin asserts this is because she was a private person and not because she was trying to maintain credibility. The editor, Raymond A. Palmer, had "little trouble working with women" as evinced by the many women who were published in Amazing during the 1940s.

== Bibliography ==
- What the Sodium Lines Revealed, Amazing Stories Quarterly (Winter 1929)
- The Undersea Tube, Amazing Stories (November 1929)
- The City on the Cloud
- Lords of the Underworld, Amazing Stories (April 1941)
- Some Considerations of and Additions to the Taylor-Wegener Hypothesis of Continental Displacement (1946)
- He Walked the Americas (1963)
- The Ancient Atlantic (1969)

== See also ==
- Women science fiction authors
- James Tiptree, Jr.
