= The Coming of the Saucers =

Book by Kenneth Arnold and Raymond Palmer

- Front cover
- Author: Kenneth Arnold and Raymond Palmer
- Original title: The Coming of the Saucers: a Documentary Report on Sky Objects that have Mystified the World
- Language: English
- Subject: Unidentified flying objects
- Publication date: 1952
- Publication place: United States
- Media type: Hardcover
- Pages: 192
- OCLC: 4432597
- LC Class: TL789 .A7

The Coming of the Saucers is a 1952 book by original 'flying saucer' witness Kenneth Arnold and magazine publisher Raymond Palmer. The book reprints and expands early articles the two had published in Palmer's magazine Fate. The work blends first-person accounts attributed to Arnold with third-person summations of UFO reports.

The book features the first publication known of the concept of a "man in black", later expanded into UFO folklore by Gray Barker in his 1956 work They Knew Too Much About Flying Saucers.

== Contents ==
In the book's first chapter, "How the Big Story Happened", Arnold describes his initial report of flying disc-like shapes near Mount Rainier, his role in the 1947 flying disc craze, his collaboration with the crew of the Flight 105 UFO sighting, and his being contacted by Raymond Palmer.

In Chapter Two, "The Tacoma Affair", Arnold describes his initial investigation of the Maury Island Incident and his meeting with Fred Crisman. In Chapter Three, "The Mysterious Informant", Arnold becomes convinced that he is being bugged electronically and summons military investigators. Chapter Four, "Death Takes A Hand", features the crash of a B-25 aircraft carrying the investigators and an anonymous claim that the airplane had been shot down. Chapter Five, "Get Out - For Your Own Good!" describes Arnold's departure from Tacoma.

The sixth chapter, "Project Saucer Report", summarizes a report by J. Allen Hynek on Project Saucer, including the Mantell UFO incident, the Chiles-Whitted UFO encounter, and the Gorman dogfight. Chapter Seven, "Comments on the 'Project Saucer' Report" features conspiratorial speculation about military secrets and a chemical analysis of the slag rocks from Tacoma.

Chapter Eight, "One Thousand Years of Flying Saucers" details historic reports of unusual airborne sightings; Chapter Nine, "The Strange Foo Fighters", examines sightings during World War Two. The tenth chapter, "Foreign Sightings" and Chapter Eleven "American Reports" detail respectively international and domestic reports from 1947 to 1951.

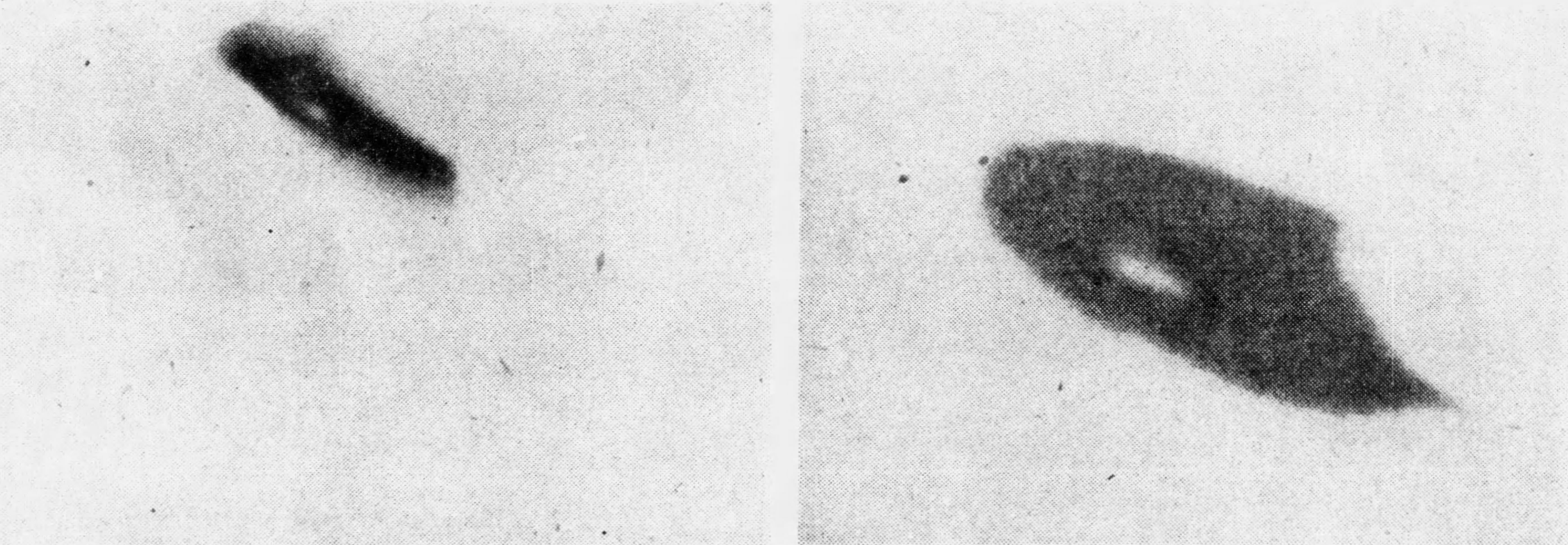
The Rhodes flying disc photos of Phoenix were reprinted in book.

Chapter 12 presents concluding analysis, while the remainder the book, Chapter 13 "Camera Story of the Saucers", features alleged photographs of the discs, such as the Rhodes UFO photographs.

== Reactions and legacy ==
One journalist recalled his skeptical response to the book: "It was a hair-raising account -- an adventure straight out of pulp fiction. I was fascinated, but also suspicious: Palmer had been a publisher of science fiction, so how much of the book was fact and how much was fiction?" Air Force UFO investigator Edward J. Ruppelt doubted the book's accuracy, noting: "As Arnold's story of what he saw that day has been handed down by the bards of saucerism, the true facts have been warped, twisted, and changed. Even some points in Arnold's own account of his sighting as published in his book, The Coming of the Saucers, do not jibe with what the official files say he told the Air Force in 1947."

For his role in promoting UFO folklore, Palmer would later be dubbed "The Man Who Invented Flying Saucers". Popular science writer Martin Gardner argued that "no one can deny that [Palmer] played an enormous role ... in tirelessly promoting the craze". The book "fueled" the extra-terrestrial hypothesis among "an increasingly saucer-hungry public". Despite coming to no definitive conclusion about the origin of the disc shapes, the book argued the issue was "vitally important".

The flying disc craze described by the book might be regarded as an example of mass hysteria. The Coming of the Saucers would be cited as influence on Bill Cooper, author of 1991 conspiracy tome Behold A Pale Horse which popularized UFO conspiracy theories among anti-government extremists.
