= William Albert Rhodes =

American astronomer and inventor (1916–2007)

Inventor William A. Rhodes

William Albert Rhodes (December 29, 1916 – January 22, 2007) was an astronomer and inventor who developed a novel method for the production of oxyhydrogen – initially named "Rhodes' Gas" after the inventor.

== Early life ==
Rhodes was born in Garden City, Kansas on December 29, 1916, to George E. and Bertha G. Rhodes. Rhodes was awarded an honorary science doctorate by Columbia University.

== Career ==
In 1929, he relocated from Loveland, Colorado, where he studied music, to Phoenix, Arizona. In 1936, Rhodes attended a meeting of The Society for Research of Meteorites. In 1939, he married Doris Fern Browning; At that time, he was a musician known professionally as "Wee Willie" and an instructor at the Institute of Educational Music. In 1940, Rhodes was profiled by the newspaper The Arizona Republic after he created a radio-controlled model airplane. In 1941, Rhodes and his life was described by an article after he spent four months constructing a telescope.

In 1947, Rhodes announced he had photographed a UFO over his house – the photos were published in The Arizona Republic.

In 1949, Rhodes authored a letter to the editor concerning a matter involving the city's garbage dumps. That same year, Rhodes was visited by a friend and colleague, inventor Lee de Forest; The visit was the subject of an article in The Arizona Republic.

In 1950, Rhodes again photographed an unidentified object, this time through a high-powered telescope. In 1951, Rhodes constructed a 16-inch portable telescope which was featured in the local newspaper. In October 1951, Rhodes reported the theft of a lethal load of radium bromide from his home laboratory; The lead-lined container, still holding the radium, was discovered the next day.

In 1952, Rhodes was mentioned in the magazine Popular Mechanics for his recent invention of a television light amplifier. In 1952, Rhodes was featured in Newsweek magazine for this TV work.

In July 1952, Rhodes again featured in the Arizona Republic which described him as an "amateur astronomer and professional electronics engineer"; Rhodes and fellow amateur astronomer Harry E. Lang speculated that flying-saucer reports might be associated with the proximity of the planet Mars. In 1955, he participated with an exhibition of solar-powered machines; Rhodes constructed a device which used solar power to create hydraulic pressure. In 1956, Rhodes and others formed the "Institute for Advanced Research".

In 1958, Rhodes authored a letter to the editor, objecting to a recent high court ruling against individuals practicing architecture without a license; Rhodes argued that "police powers of this state are being used to protect the vaunted who who, like most of us human beings, dislike competition". Also in 1958, Rhodes was profiled after building a bomb shelter.

In 1957, Rhodes again was consulted by the Arizona Republic, where he debunked a recent unidentified sighting – Rhodes explained the object was a first magnitude star.

In August 1959, he authored a letter comparing Socialism and Communism.

In 1960, Rhodes helped the Republic compute schedules for when the US satellite Echo 1 would be visible from Phoenix. In 1960, after local skywatchers reported an unidentified light, Rhodes explained that the object, which he viewed through his telescope, appeared to be a Sabre jet. In 1961, Rhodes helped develop a heat detection device for local firefighters. In 1962, Rhodes applied for (and later received) a patent for an invention concerning the electrolytic production of oxyhydrogen – initially named "Rhodes' Gas" and later "Brown's Gas".

== Personal life and death ==
Rhoades’ first wife was Doris Fern Browning (married 1939). They were divorced in 1942, and had a son, George Wyatt Rhodes. In 1959, Rhodes authored a tribute to his recently deceased wife Maxine. In 1959, Rhodes married Eileen Tremble Baker. followed in the 1960s by marriages to Betty Brown and Phillis (last name not known by the editor). In 1980, he married Nancy Virginia Ross. They remained married until his death.

Rhodes died on January 22, 2007.
