= Flying Saucers (magazine) =

- Founder: Raymond A. Palmer
- First issue: 1957; 69 years ago
- Final issue: 1977; 49 years ago
- Country: United States

Flying Saucers was a monthly magazine published and edited by Raymond A. Palmer, devoted to articles on UFOs and the Shaver Mystery.

== History ==
The magazine was first published as Flying Saucers from Other Worlds in 1957, before evolving into Flying Saucers in 1958. The initial title was designed to create confusion with a science fiction magazine Other Worlds, which Palmer also published and which overlapped for two issues. Such confusion may have been designed to overcome the difficulty that a new magazine in a new category would have in finding space on news stands, to help attract readership, or more likely both. The confusion continues to tax magazine collectors to this day.

Flying Saucers From Other Worlds was first published in June 1957 and cost 35 cents an issue. The editorial by Ray Palmer on page 4 begins with "This is the first Flying Saucers From Other Worlds. Ray A. Palmer was Editor, Gray Barker was Eastern Editor and August C. Roberts was Photo Editor. Col. Ron Ormond was Western Editor several issues later. The front cover of issue number one was a composite from the movies Forbidden Planet" and "Captive Women". The editorial address was in Amherst, Wisconsin. The magazine itself was published by Palmer Publications, Inc. in Evanston, Illinois.

The Flying Saucers From Other Worlds May 1958 Issue No. 29 was the last one by that title. In the July–August 1958 Issue No. 30 the name of the magazine was changed to Flying Saucers, The Magazine of Space Conquest. Ray Palmer was still editor at that time. The title was later changed to Flying Saucers, Mysteries of the Space Age and the magazine continued until June 1976 when it ceased publication.
