= Raymond A. Palmer =

American editor and novelist (1910–1977)

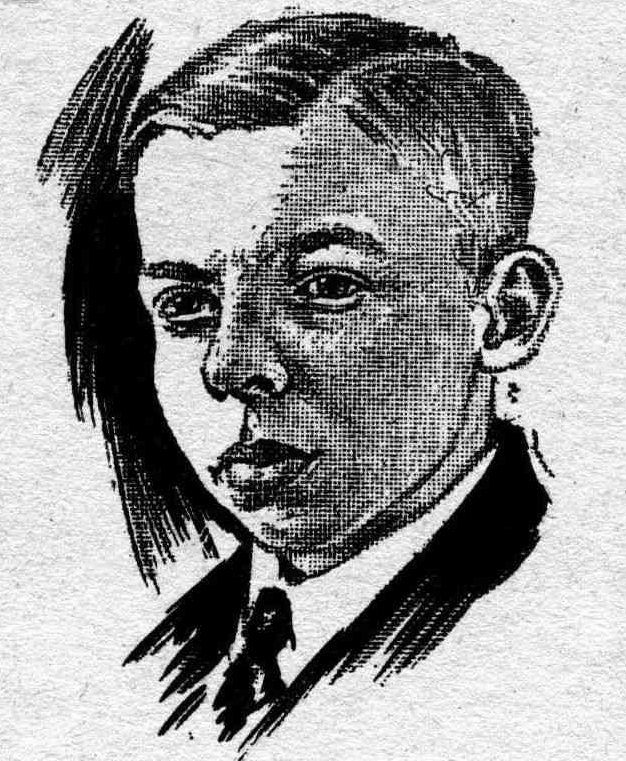
- Raymond A. Palmer c. 1930
- Born: Raymond Alfred Palmer; August 1, 1910; Milwaukee, Wisconsin, U.S.
- Died: August 15, 1977 (aged 67); Portage, Wisconsin, U.S.
- Occupations: Writer, editor
- Writing career
- Genre: Science fiction

Raymond Alfred Palmer (August 1, 1910 – August 15, 1977) was an American author and magazine editor. Influential in the first wave of science fiction fandom, his first fiction stories were published in 1935.

Ziff Davis named him editor of the science fiction magazine Amazing Stories in 1938 and editor of its sister publication, Fantastic Stories, in 1939. He began promoting the "Shaver Mystery", a series of stories about ancient aliens, lost civilizations, and underground inhabitants, in 1944. He claimed the stories were true, which caused a deep rift in science fiction fandom and readership. On the orders of the magazine's owners, he ended the Shaver Mystery in 1948.

Palmer established his own publishing house in 1947. After leaving Ziff Davis in 1949, he began publishing the magazines Fate, Other Worlds Science Stories, Mystic (later renamed Search), and Flying Saucers, among others.

He wrote a short autobiography titled Martian Diary, co-wrote The Coming of the Saucers with Kenneth Arnold, edited Richard Sharpe Shaver's The Hidden World, and republished the original edition of the spiritualist work, Oahspe: A New Bible.

Palmer frequently pushed fringe beliefs and conspiracy theories, and was investigated by the FBI at least once. He was linked to an inquiry into the publication of pornographic paperback books, but his involvement was tangential at best.

Raymond Palmer's editing of Amazing Stories has a mixed legacy, primarily due to his promotion of the Shaver Mystery. His editing of Other Worlds Science Stories has been praised, and he is an important early figure in the history of the flying saucer and New Age movements.

== Early life ==
Raymond Alfred Palmer was born August 1, 1910, in Milwaukee, Wisconsin. (Note: Biographer Fred Nadis gives a date of August 10, but a Stevens Point Journal obituary, biographer Richard Toronto, Florida Death Index, and the Social Security Master Death File all give a birthdate of August 1.) His parents were Roy and Helen (née Steber) Palmer. His father was of Irish ancestry who had held jobs as an electrician, machinist, and timekeeper at a marble company. He became a firefighter in 1911. The Palmer family were Ulster Protestants who emigrated from Northern Ireland. According to Palmer family lore, the Pricketts (as they were then known) were driven out of Northern Ireland by Catholics. Once in the United States, the family converted to Catholicism. His mother was from northern Wisconsin, the daughter of German Lutheran immigrants.

Roy Clarence Palmer was an alcoholic whose excessive drinking left the family impoverished. He also physically beat his wife.

The Palmers lived a peripatetic existence, moving to a new home almost every year from 1912 to 1921. (Note: The family did not move in 1917, 1918, or 1919.) Ray's sister Evelyn was born in 1917, and his brother David in 1918. The family moved into the home of Ray's paternal grandparents in 1920 after Helen Palmer's health declined severely.

When Palmer was seven years old, he ran out into traffic. His leg was caught in the spokes of a passing truck, (Note: Palmer himself said, at various times, it was a beer, butcher, or milk truck.) and he was spun around and beaten against the pavement until it came to a stop. The accident badly broke several of his vertebrae. Roy Palmer refused to have his son taken to a hospital, probably because the family could not pay. A social worker visited a few days later, and took Ray to a hospital. (Note: It was most likely Milwaukee Children's Free Hospital, which provided free healthcare to the indigent.) According to Ray's friend, Frances Hamling, Ray became infected with Pott's disease (tuberculosis of the spine), and by the age of nine could no longer stand or walk.

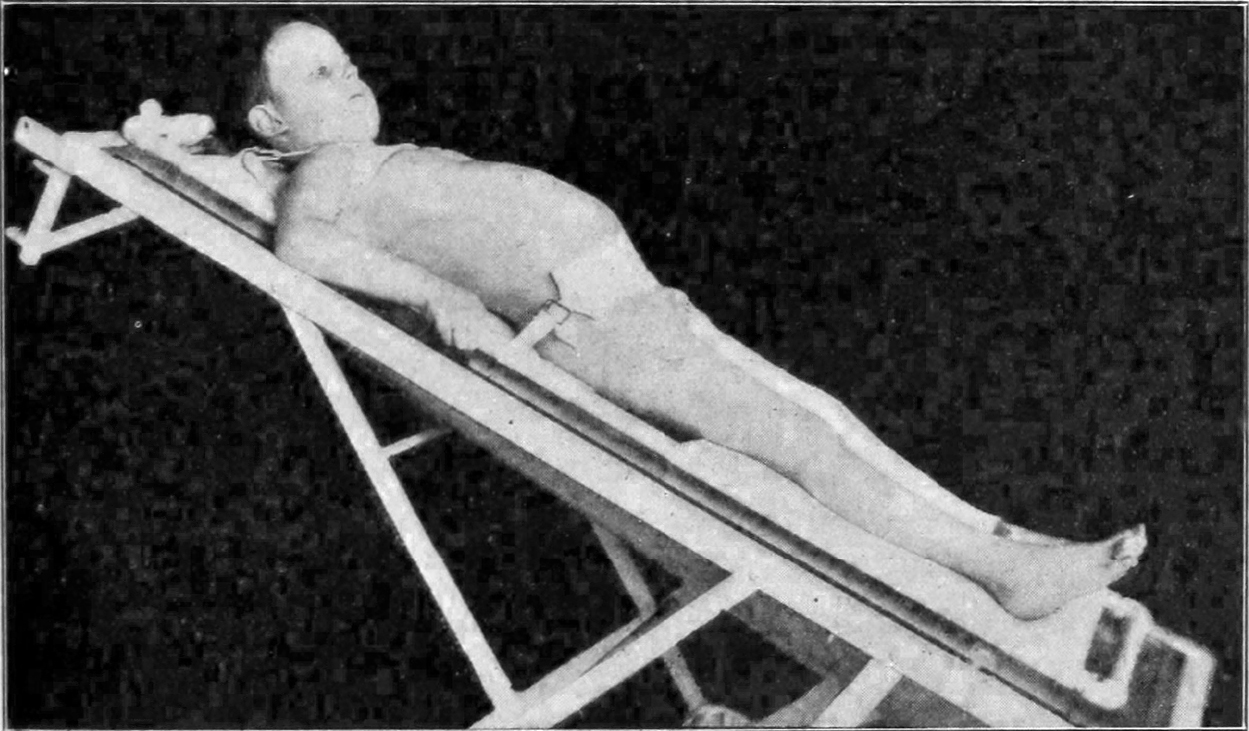
A boy in 1907, strapped supine to a Bradford frame.

Palmer underwent a spinal column bone graft performed by Dr. Frederick J. Gaenslen. (Note: Palmer claimed he was the first in the nation to receive one. Dr. Fred H. Albee pioneered the spinal bone graft in 1909, reporting the results in 1911. None of the cases reported by Albee match those of Ray Palmer.) Pott's disease is often accompanied by kyphosis (hunchback), and Gaenslen's standard recuperative treatment required the patient to be in the prone position in a Bradford frame (a full-body metal rectangle with a canvas sleeve) for up to a year. Palmer's graft became infected, and he was given morphine for the pain. Combination of illnesses and trauma stunted Ray's growth, and as an adult he stood just slightly over 4 feet (1.2 m) tall. (Note: Palmer himself put his height at 4 feet 8 inches (1.42 m).) He spent most of the next five years prone in a Bradford frame.

Palmer's mother died of peritonitis and pneumonia on January 26, 1923, and Palmer blamed his father for his disability. As he grew older, he became embittered, isolated, stubborn, and plagued by an inferiority complex. He was embarrassed by his hunchback, and worried that he would never lead a normal life.

Ray's paternal grandparents moved in with the family to care for the children. Roy Palmer remarried in 1924. His new wife, Mathilda, was 14 years his junior. In 1928, Mathilda gave birth to Ray's half-brother, Robert. Ray delivered newspaper to make money, and his father seized the income to make Ray pay for "room and board".

During his convalescence, Ray was largely educated by a tutor provided by the Milwaukee public school system. He read on a wide range of topics, sometimes as many as 15 books a day. It was during this period that he became a fan of Ancient Egyptian history and science fiction. Palmer recovered enough to begin attending Washington High School in February 1924. He left in June 1925, most likely due to a relapse in health. He spent two more years bedridden. At the age of 16, Palmer enrolled at St. Anne's School, a Catholic school in Milwaukee. After completing the ninth grade, he dropped out. (Note: Journalist and science fiction fan Harry Warner Jr. claims Palmer relapsed in 1923, but Richard Toronto points out that paperwork from Washington High School and St. Anne's Catholic School indicates a relapse in 1925.) (Note: Although Palmer claimed to have graduated from high school at the age of 16, Richard Toronto says there is no evidence for this. Palmer's schooling stopped at age 16; there is no evidence that he ever attended high school.)

Palmer began reading Amazing Stories magazine after discovering its first issue in the spring of 1926. He wrote his first science fiction story, "The Time Ray of Jandra", in high school. His English teacher was so impressed, she read it aloud to her class.

Roy Palmer moved his family once again in 1929.

=== Fanzines and fandom ===
Ray got a job as a bookkeeper at the P.J. Lavies sheet metal company after high school, and began writing short science fiction stories in his spare time. Palmer had several of his letters to the editor published in Amazing Stories. To encourage science fiction fandom, the magazine published addresses of its letter-writers. Walter Dennis, a Chicago fan, traveled to Milwaukee to meet Ray.

Palmer and Dennis created a "Science Correspondence Club" in May 1930 to help fans connect with one another. This was, according to science fiction historian Mike Ashley, the first organized sci fi fandom group.

The two men also created and edited the first fanzine, The Comet, which first appeared in May 1930. Initially focused on spreading the word about new scientific discoveries and inventions, it refocused on science fiction writing in its second issue in July 1930. During Palmer's second bout with TB, the magazine's name was changed to Cosmology. Its publication became erratic due to lack of funds, and in January 1932 Palmer resigned as editor.

The Science Correspondence Club was reorganized as the International Scientific Association in January 1932. Although it disbanded the next month, by then it was the longest-lasting science fiction fandom club in the United States.

Palmer co-founded a second fanzine, The Time Traveller, with Forrest J Ackerman, Julius Schwartz, and Mort Weisinger. It began publication in December 1932 and lasted just over a year.

=== Second illness ===
In May 1930, Palmer was diagnosed with Pott's disease again. It caused the bone graft and six of his vertebrae to disintegrate. In September 1930, Palmer went to Muirdale Tuberculosis Sanatorium. A physician told him he had six months to live until his spinal cord was exposed. The tuberculosis was already in remission, but Muirdale physicians did not want to operate and debride the bone for fear of reactivating the infection. Ray only received palliative care. For the next year, Palmer lay flat on his back, holding himself rigid and visualizing his body healing itself. When he did not die, doctors ordered new X-rays and discovered that the damaged area had become encased in a new mass of bone. Palmer was discharged in 1931.

Palmer biographer Richard Toronto suggests that Ray Palmer now showed many of the signs of a classic trauma victim. He sought out any way in which to build his resilience, a typical coping method. He also exhibited a strong urge to control the world around him. Palmer often spoke of "knowing" that he would survive Pott's disease. Toronto notes that "precognition of survival" is not uncommon among victims of trauma. To show his resilience, Palmer temporarily left his job as a bookkeeper at P.J. Lavies and became a steeplejack, installing aluminum roofs and gutters. He also took up bowling, jogging, and softball. To control his world, Palmer came to believe that his dreams could show him visions of what was happening around the world at that moment, and could foretell the future. He had visualized his own healing, and now believed that goal-directed visualization and imagination had not only been critical to his own survival but was critical to humanity's survival.

== Writing ==
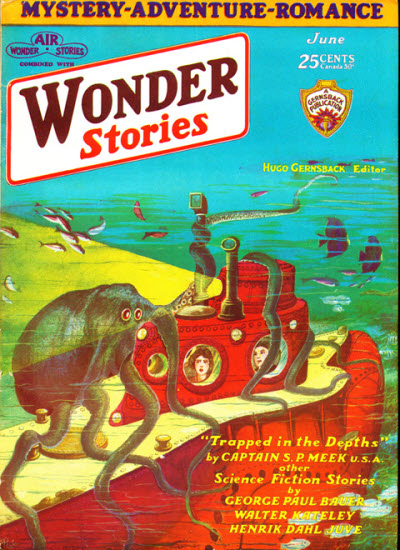
Palmer's first science fiction story, "The Time Ray of Jandra", saw publication in Wonder Stories in June 1930.

Throughout the 1930s, Palmer had his stories published in science fiction magazines of the era. Palmer's first professionally published story was "The Time Ray of Jandra" in Wonder Stories in June 1930. Lester del Rey believed Palmer was the first fan to publish professionally.

About 1932, Palmer joined the Milwaukee Fictioneers, a group of about 20 or so working writers who met every other week to talk about their stories, discuss writing, and figure out ways to sell their work. Members included founder Lawrence A. Keating, Moritz "Morry" Zenoff, Larry Sternig, Leo A. Schmidt, Bernard Wirth, Dudley Brooks, Gus Marx, Al Nelson, Roger Sherman Hoar (who wrote under the pen name Ralph Milne Farley), Stanley G. Weinbaum, Robert Bloch, Jim Kjelgaard, and Arthur Tofte. The Fictioneers were the most significant influence on Palmer's writing.

In 1936, the Fictioneers published Dawn of Flame, a fix-up of two of Stanley Weinbaum's unpublished stories ("Dawn of Flame" and "The Black Flame"). It was the first anthology ever published featured the work of a science fiction author. Palmer wrote the foreword. Weinbaum's wife felt it was far too personal, and asked that a new forward be written. Lawrence Keating wrote the replacement. Only six copies of the "Palmer edition" were sold, and only 250 copies sold of the "Keating edition" (many of them unbound).

In March 1936, Palmer began writing crime stories full-time for Shade Publishing Company's Associated Authors subsidiary, which published racy detective magazines. His pay was $150 a month. Palmer wrote two entries for the "Jim Grant" character created by Hoar (Note: Under his Farley pen name, Hoar had created the detective Jim Grant for Shade's True Gang Life magazine.) as well as stories for Murder Mysteries, True Gang Life, Scarlet Adventuress, Scarlet Gang Stories, Spicy Detective, and Thrilling Wonder Stories. Among the pen names Palmer used for his crime fiction were Alexander Blade, Henry Cade, G.H. Irwin, Joseph J. Millard, Frank Patton, Wallace Quitman, Rap, A.R. Steber, Morris J. Steele, Robert N. Webster, and Rae Winters.

From 1935 to 1938, Palmer also wrote science fiction for Amazing Stories, Astounding Science Fiction, Marvel Tales, and Wonder Stories. Palmer was a prolific writer. He later estimated that from December 1934 to March 1935 he wrote 150,000 words for pulp magazines.

Palmer's personal life was going through a difficult period. Roy and Hilda separated in 1933, and moved out of Milwaukee in 1934. When Roy Palmer returned to Milwaukee in 1936, he was divorced. One day, Roy moved out, taking everything with him. Ray returned home to an empty apartment. Ray was now in charge of 19-year-old Evelyn, 18-year-old David, and eight-year-old Robert. Ray quit his job as a bookkeeper in March 1936 to write full-time. His father lost his job in June 1937 after a fire at his place of employment, and Palmer returned to work at the P.J. Lavies sheet metal firm in order to support his father. The firm shut down about February 1938 when the owner fell seriously ill.

== Ziff Davis magazines ==
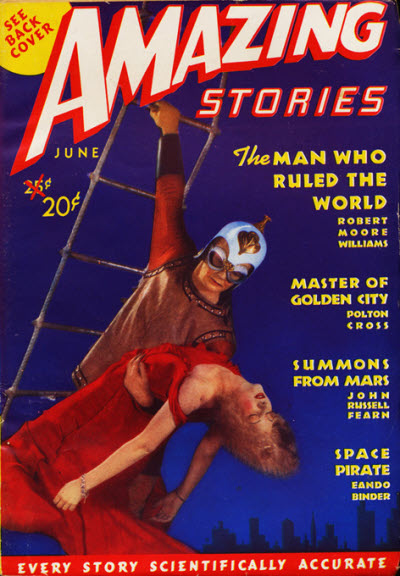
Palmer's first issue of Amazing Stories introduced a redesigned logo and the unlikely claim "Every Story Scientifically Accurate"

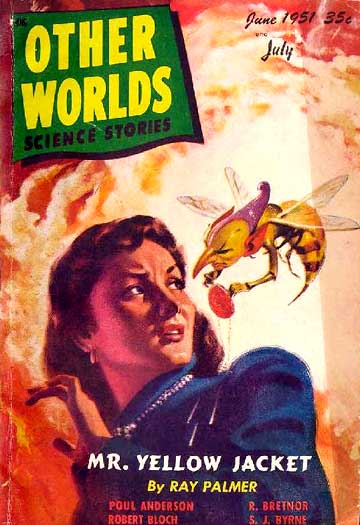
Palmer's short story "Mr. Yellow Jacket" was cover-featured on Other Worlds in 1951

In August 1932, Palmer, Ackerman, Schwartz, Weisinger, Maurice Z. Ingher, and Conrad "Conny" Ruppert began publication of a professional magazine, Science Fiction Digest. The first issue was published in September. Retitled Fantasy Magazine in January 1934 and lasting until December 1934, its primary audience was fandom and it proved to be a watershed in the science fiction movement. It published original stories as well, its most famous being the serial novel Cosmos. The idea of a serial novel written in round-robin style was Palmer's idea. The 17-chapter serial was written by some of the top names in science fiction, including Roger Sherman Hoar, David H. Keller, George Henry Weiss (using his pseudonym Francis Flagg), John W. Campbell, Otis Adelbert Kline, Abraham Merritt, Edward E. "Doc" Smith, P. Schuyler Miller, Lloyd Arthur Eshbach, and Edmond Hamilton. Palmer also wrote a column for the magazine, titled "Spilling the Atoms", a mix of news about fandom and contests intended to boost the magazine's readership—all written in a chatty, informal style. He used the byline "RAP", a nickname bestowed on Palmer by Ackerman, Schwartz, and Aubrey Clements (a prominent member of science fiction fandom and, by 1930, president of the Science Correspondence Club).

=== Amazing Stories ===
In mid January 1938, magazine publisher Ziff Davis acquired Amazing Stories. Under 86-year-old editor Dr. T. O'Conor Sloane, the magazine was failing and nearing bankruptcy. Readership had fallen from 100,000 readers in 1926 to just 40,000 in 1938. Sloane's editorial tone was "courtly and reserved". He favored science fiction stories that conveyed information about cutting-edge science and science writing that was Victorian (scientists were treated as unerring, highly respected individuals, while science writers translated their inevitably complex ideas into simple terms for an adoring, respectful readership). Ziff Davis fired Sloane.

Bernard G. Davis moved the Amazing Stories editorial office to Chicago, where Ziff Davis was headquartered. Davis sought out Roger Sherman Hoar, partly because he was an accomplished writer of science fiction and partly because he was from Milwaukee and would be willing to relocate to Chicago. Hoar declined the position, and suggested Raymond Palmer for the job.

Davis hired Palmer to edit Amazing Stories in February 1938. (Note: Palmer claimed that Hoar went to Davis in person to determine if Ziff Davis would purchase his work, and Davis offered Farley the job. Robert Bloch, however, says Davis called Hoar on the phone. Palmer further claims that Davis called him that night, and the very next day Palmer moved to Chicago to take up the position.) His first day on the job was February 14, 1938, and the pay was $75 a week.

Palmer was told to significantly boost circulation in the next issue, or the publication would be shuttered. Davis encouraged Palmer to target a young male audience, and Palmer did not want to "aim too high". Palmer was in complete agreement: The competing magazine Astounding Science Fiction was for intellectuals, and Amazing Stories was not going to compete with them. His intent was to publish the kind of thrilling adventure-romance stories that had so excited him as a teenager.

Palmer described his editorial approach as focusing more on story than on science. He wanted dramatic action, fast narrative pacing, suspense, and snappy dialogue. His intended audience for Amazing Stories was the teenager on the street and military servicemen.

Palmer discovered the material purchased by his predecessor was quite poor, and he quickly asked his Fictioneer friends to supply new stories. At Amazing Stories, Ray Palmer published the first science fiction stories by Robert Bloch and Isaac Asimov, and the first of the Adam Link stories by "Eando Binder" (the pen name of brothers Earl and Otto Binder). Palmer's old friends Julius Schwartz and Mort Weisinger had founded Solar Sales Service, a literary talent agency for science fiction authors, and Palmer sourced stories frequently from Solar Sales clients. In time, Palmer established a coterie of writers who turned in a set quota of words per issue, in return for a steady paycheck.

Palmer also published his own work in Amazing, using a wide range of pen names. He often ran fake biographies of these pen names in the magazine, and in editorials attacked the "author" for various literary, scientific, and personal faults. Palmer took delight in fooling readers, but at times would signal the hoax by making ludicrous claims or humorous injections. Palmer was poor, isolated, and lonely in Chicago in his early months there. This changed over time as he initiated employee poker nights at his apartment and coffee klatsches in cafés, and hosted visiting writers in his home. He also played on various Ziff Davis sports teams. Privately, he remained lonely and angry, and his writing, in stories like "Outlaw of Space" and "Lone Wolf of Space", reflected his emotional state.

Ray also revamped the magazine internally. He began running single-panel cartoons, the occasional humor article, quizzes about science, and short pieces on history. He greatly expanded the letters section, and published notices of fan events and fan publications. The tone of his new editor's column, "The Observatory", was "brash, silly, and chummy".

Palmer also changed how the magazine looked. Cover art for the magazine was racy and lurid, supplied by artists such as Harold W. McCauley and Robert Gibson Jones. (In April 1941, Amazing Stories became the first science fiction pulp magazine to show a quasi-bare-breasted woman.) He replaced the advertisement on the back cover with relatively science-accurate scenes of planets, "cars of the future", and cutting-edge devices like atomic power plants. Such prominently placed educational illustrations were innovative, and often painted by Frank R. Paul.

According to Palmer, Amazing Stories sold only 27,000 copies per issue when he took over. His first issue sold 45,000 copies, and his second 75,000. Circulation continued to rise. Palmer's assistant editor, William Hamling pegged circulation at about 200,000 in 1940.

Amazing Stories began running war stories in 1940, many of them featuring German or Japanese villains.

Palmer turned almost all editing of Amazing Stories over to William Hamling in 1948, although Palmer remained on the masthead as editor. Howard Browne took over editorship of Amazing Stories with the January 1950 issue.

=== Fantastic Adventures ===
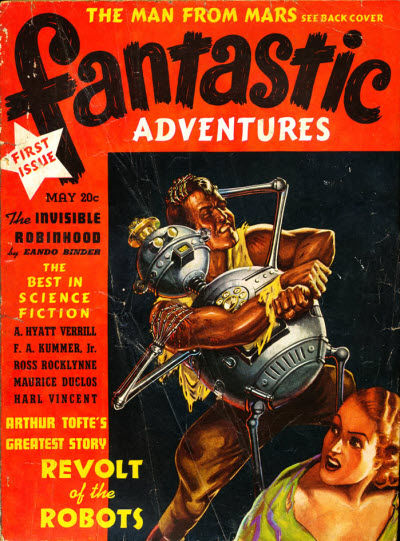
First issue of Fantastic Adventures, May 1939.

The rapid rise in readership for Amazing Stories prompted Palmer to successfully propose that Ziff Davis launch a sister "weird stories" magazine, Fantastic Adventures. The first issue appeared in May 1939. Fantastic Adventures was an immediate hit, with the first issue selling 45,000 to 75,000 copies. (Note: Warner Jr. reported that the first issue of Fantastic Adventures sold 45,000 issues, and then leveled off at 90,000 copies a few issues later. Palmer, however, claimed the magazine sold 75,000 copies its first issue, and within a year was selling 185,000 copies per issue.)

The magazine, published in the large-size bedsheet format, focused on "lost world" fiction epitomized by the writing of Edgar Rice Burroughs. Palmer wanted to publish high-quality stories that retained "the lusty appeal of the pulp". He told potential writers to "Gimme bang-bang" or "When a story stops moving, that is the exact spot where the writer should drop a corpse through the roof". "Swift, dramatic action, with plenty of suspense and the anticipation of the fearful" was his charge to authors, and initially Fantastic Adventures published both fantasy and science fiction. (Note: Palmer likely used the higher-quality work submitted to Amazing Stories for the new magazine at first.) But after the success of Nelson S. Bond's "The Amazing Invention of Wilberforce Weems", published in the September 1939 issue, Palmer pushed for whimsical fantasy.

Among the early fiction published by Fantastic Adventures were "The Scientists Revolt" by Edgar Rice Burroughs and "The Golden Amazon" by Thornton Ayre (pseudonym of John Russell Fearn). The four Golden Amazon stories published by Fantastic Adventures, which featured heroine Violet Ray, were among the most popular Golden Amazon stories published. (Note: After the four initial short stories, Fearn began a serial novel in the Toronto Star Weekly. The Golden Amazon series stopped only with Fearn's death in 1960.)

Bi-monthly at first, Fantastic Adventures went monthly from January to May 1940. Barely profitable, it went bi-monthly again and converted to digest size in June 1940. Ziff Davis intended to cancel the magazine in October 1940, but that issue saw the story "Jongor of Lost Land" by Robert Moore Williams. Sales doubled, and the magazine was given a reprieve. Palmer then convinced Burroughs to write a new Carson of Venus story. This work, "Slaves of the Fish Men", ran in the March 1941 issue. Sales finally stabilized at a high level.

Palmer continued to feature a mixture of whimsy and "lost land" stories in Amazing Stories through 1945. He became a believer in Richard Sharpe Shaver's "Hollow Earth" conspiracy theory stories (which Shaver alleged were true, not fiction), publishing them frequently in Amazing. This gave the magazine a "crackpot" reputation.

Howard Browne resigned from Ziff Davis in the spring of 1947 to pursue a writing career in Hollywood. William Hamling was made managing editor of Fantastic Adventures as his replacement.

=== Other Ziff Davis magazines ===
In 1939, Ziff Davis launched the pulps South Sea Stories and Air Adventures, with Palmer editing both. Air Adventures lasted just two issues, (Note: December 1939 and February 1940. A special issue, celebrating the end of World War II, appeared in November 1945.) and South Sea Stories ended publication in October 1940.

Palmer was also editing Mammoth Adventures and Mammoth Western.

== The Shaver controversy ==
The Shaver Mystery was a series of fiction and (allegedly) non-fiction stories which appeared primarily in Amazing Stories from March 1945 to May 1948. The stories, primarily written by Richard Sharpe Shaver, maintained that the world was ruled by insane descendants of aliens who lived in a Hollow Earth. (Note: The Hollow Earth theory can be traced to the writings of John Cleves Symmes Jr. in 1818. It gained much popularity in the early 20th century with the publication of books such as William Reed's The Phantom of the Poles (1906), Willis George Emerson's The Smoky God (1908), Marshall B. Gardner's A Journey to the Earth's Interior (1913), and Ferdynand Ossendowski's Beasts, Men and Gods (1922). Ossendowski claimed there was a subterranean world beneath Asia named Agarthi. There, millions of inhabitants were ruled by a "King of the World" who would one day lead all "good" people in a crusade against evil. In Palmer's story "Tales From Tibet" (Amazing Stories, February 1946), he suggested Agarthi was an evil realm. His readers bitterly complained. He followed up with "King of the World?" (Amazing Stories, May 1946), in which he claimed the King of the World was actually a Venusian.) The Shaver Mystery is the most prominent event in Palmer's writing and editorial career, and a deeply influential event in science fiction literature and fandom.

From 1945 to 1949, Palmer published two dozen Shaver stories, most of them featured on the cover of Amazing Stories.

=== Beginning of Shaverism ===
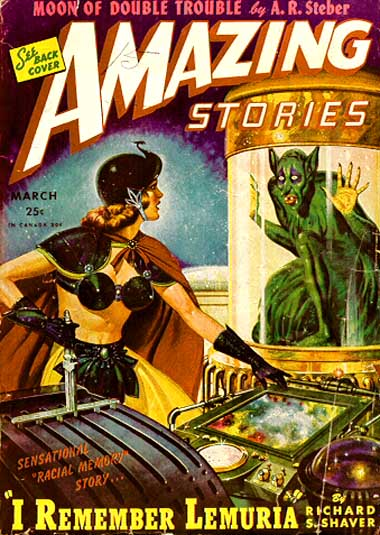
Cover art for Amazing Stories of March 1945, featuring "I Remember Lemuria!". This was the first Shaver Mystery story.

Richard Shaver was a schizophrenic who had spent nearly a decade in psychiatric hospitals. (Note: In Search magazine in the summer of 1977, Palmer claimed that Shaver had actually spent these years in a catatonic state, while his mind visited other realms.) In October 1943, he sent a letter to Amazing Stories claiming secret knowledge of two underground races (the "Deros" and "Teros") manipulating humanity. He had even deciphered "Mantong", an ancient alien "mother tongue" from which all modern languages were descended (a barely-concealed version of the modern English alphabet). Palmer famously rescued the letter from a wastebasket, where assistant editor Harold Browne had tossed it. He sensed that Shaver's ramblings could be turned into an excellent series of science fiction stories, and asked Shaver to send him a story.

Shaver sent Palmer a 10,000-word manuscript titled "A Warning to Future Men". Amazing Stories purchased the manuscript on January 14, 1944. Palmer told Shaver that he wanted to publish the basic story as a fiction piece in Amazing Stories, but it would need some heavy editing. Shaver and Palmer agreed that Palmer should essentially ghostwrite it. For most of 1944, Shaver wrote nearly every day to Palmer, corresponding about the "mystery" and Palmer's changes to the first story. Palmer began the rewrite in May 1944, transforming what Shaver believed to be truth into Palmer's idea of a fiction story that could generate intense reader interest (and sales) as well as additional material. Just how much Palmer changed Shaver's manuscripts is a matter of dispute. Palmer claimed he made significant changes, but Shaver said very few were made (most of them cuts, not edits).

Palmer published the letter "An Ancient Language" by Richard S. Shaver (writing as "S. Shaver") in the January 1944 issue of Amazing Stories. It contained Shaver's "discovery" and explanation of the working of the Mantong alphabet. In a comment on the letter, Palmer claimed Shaver had tapped into a "racial memory" and that "testing" had found his Mantong alphabet to be "90 percent true". (This changed. Shaver objected to the term "racial memory" and said his visions were "thought records". In a June 1945 editorial, Palmer changed his terminology to "thought record".) (Note: The term "thought record" had been introduced in the story "I Remember Lemuria!" According to Shaver, Teros in caves transmitted this "thought record" into his mind via an invisible ray.)

In May and December 1944, Palmer discussed the upcoming Shaver story in his editorial column in Amazing Stories to build reader anticipation. Palmer depicted the story as true. For his part, Palmer wrote that he believed Shaver was sincere. (Note: In letters written to friends and colleagues during the Shaver Mystery period, Palmer said that he honestly believed Shaver really had come into contact with rays.)

The first Shaver story, the 31,000-word "I Remember Lemuria", was published in the March 1945 issue of Amazing Stories. (Note: Palmer would have published it in mid-1944, but a wartime paper shortage delayed publication.) In his "The Observatory" editorial in the March 1945 issue, Palmer announced that five more Shaver stories were coming. He claimed that fact had now outstripped fiction, and science fiction was dying. Therefore, "science fiction" was henceforth to be defined as speculative articles about mysteries from the past. According to Palmer biographer Fred Nadis, what Palmer was proposing was a blend of science fiction with the occult.

The Shaver stories were immediately and immensely popular. Palmer convinced executives at Ziff Davis to give him a load of scarce pulp paper intended for use by Mammoth Detective magazine. This was used to print an extra 50,000 copies of the March Amazing. Palmer's instincts paid off: The March issue sold 185,000 copies and the May issue 200,000. Sales continued to rise significantly for the next two issues. Hundreds of letters poured in, although a good many of the pro-Shaver letters initially published in Amazing Stories were written by Palmer himself. Over time, Palmer's public opinion of Shaver's writing rose, and once he even called it "almost lyrical". (Note: Richard Shaver was extremely interested in BDSM, cannibalism, sex, and torture. His stories included so much of it that Palmer frequently had to tone it down significantly for publication.) Palmer increased Shaver's pay from 1 to 2 cents a word in June 1945.

=== Palmer-Shaver friendship ===
Palmer traveled in March 1945 to Shaver's home in Barto, Pennsylvania, to meet the author. While staying at Shaver's home, Palmer claimed to have heard as many as five disembodied Dero and Tero voices during the night. Palmer claimed in Amazing Stories that there was no possible way that Shaver had created these voices. Palmer later said the voices did, in fact, come from Shaver. But Shaver was in a trance, and "possessed" by Deros and Teros. Linda and Jennifer, Palmer's daughters, witnessed Shaver speaking in voices one December in the early 1950s. Shaver replied that he never entered trances and made these voices. Palmer's claim opened a rift in the Palmer-Shaver friendship which widened over time. In June 1947, Palmer admitted that he had "self-hypnotized" the night he heard voices in Shaver's home.

Palmer and Shaver became friends, a friendship which deepened once Shaver moved next door to Palmer in Wisconsin in 1945.

William B. Ziff, co-owner of Ziff Davis, was worried by Palmer's claims that the Shaver Mystery stories were true. He feared Palmer was making Ziff Davis into a laughingstock. When Palmer proposed that Ziff Davis publish a book of Shaver's writings in 1945, Ziff personally nixed the effort.

At some point prior to 1945, Palmer read Oahspe: A New Bible, an 1882 spiritualist work by American dentist John Ballou Newbrough. Oahspe talked about "Atmospheria", multiple layers of the Earth's atmosphere, each one a different plane of existence inhabited by spirits of the dead in various stages of enlightenment. Palmer shared Oahspe with Shaver. Shaver, a dedicated atheist and materialist, rejected Oahspe and thought it had confused Palmer's thinking.

=== Claims that Shaver stories are true ===
Palmer's editorial stance on the Shaver Mystery was that it was at least partly true. He first made this claim in an editorial in Amazing Stories in September 1945, even going so far as to declare that he had evidence supporting the "mystery". He editorialized in June 1946, "For those of our readers (they are in the minority!) who are 'certain' the Shaver Mystery is a hoax, let it be definitely placed on the record that your editor 'believes' it is a legitimate mystery, and that he 'knows' it is neither a hoax on his part nor on Mr. Shaver's!" In March 1947, he repeated his claim: "Every word uttered editorially in Amazing Stories is my 'firm conviction', not any attempt at a hoax", and in April attacked those who claimed he was hallucinating. However, in the May 1955 issue of Other Worlds Science Stories, Palmer claimed that the "Shaver Mystery" was his own creation.

Palmer's personal beliefs are harder to pin down. Chester Geier claimed that, at a minimum Palmer saw deep meaning in the Shaver stories, and more likely Palmer believed that contained at least some truth. Howard Browne believed Palmer knew it was a hoax, and he pushed it solely to make money. The Shaver Mystery certainly fascinated Ray, says author Richard Toronto. In a private letter to Harlan Ellison, Palmer said the Shaver stores were tall tales, and intended merely to improve sales. Walter Dunkelberger, editor of the fanzine Fanews, met with Palmer and concluded that Palmer really believed Shaver. In private letters to Shaver, however, Palmer came across as a true believer. He wrote to Shaver in March 1944: "I know the dero have failed with me, because my thinking has been greatly sharpened, and in two months I have been able to entirely revise my concept of the universe, and everything has fallen into order." In a 1957 letter to flying saucer believer Gary Barker, Palmer admitted that pushing the Shaver Mystery made good business sense, but he also pushed it because the stories resonated with him.

In June 1946, Palmer reported in his "The Shaver Mystery" column that a group of spiritualists had warned Palmer that "Deros" were after him for publishing "the truth" about Shaverism. Palmer scoffed at the source (as he did not believe in spiritualism), but did affirm that someone had attempted to kidnap him and his family and replace them with perfectly trained "Dero" doubles. (Note: According to Shaver, evil Deros used ray machines to confuse human beings, cause them to do wrong, and hinder them through accidents and other incidents. Palmer claimed in the June 1946 Amazing Stories to have received schematics and instructions for building a machine that stops Dero ray machines. A Tero gave it to him, he said. He even claimed that staff had Radio News magazine had checked out the diagrams, and that the machine would operate, although no one knew if it would actually stop Dero rays.) Information about the kidnapping plot "[came] to Mr. Shaver by means of telaug ray operated by tero in the caves..."

In September 1945, Ray urged readers of Amazing Stories who had experiences similar to Shaver's to write in, and many did so. Palmer wrote that he believed many readers knew they were on Earth for a secret purpose, and he encouraged them to share "things today unknown to science" with Amazing Stories. More than 2,500 letters poured in. Palmer published letters from members of occult societies like the Brotherhood of the White Temple as well as readers who had simply had frightening experiences. A vocal minority of Amazing Stories readers responded to these letters by calling Shaver supporters lunatics.

A few fans went so far as to prank Palmer by submitting letters that contained outlandish "Shaverist experiences". Palmer was usually able to sense which letter-writers were honest and which were deceitful, but his enthusiasm for "Shaverism" led his instincts astray and many letters made it through. Palmer hoaxed his sceptics in turn. In 1946, he published a letter (allegedly from William Hamling) in Amazing Stories which claimed that Ray Palmer had suffered a nervous breakdown. Palmer pranked his readers in order to find out who his enemies were. Those who gloated over Palmer's "breakdown" were quickly ostracized by him. (Note: Palmer later claimed that he had a list of 173 fans who hated him.)

As readers began to point out the scientific impossibility of Shaver's claims, Palmer responded in an editorial in December 1945 that the Shaver Mystery could be neither proven nor disproven scientifically. Palmer also asserted that scientists were "changing their minds" all the time about what was scientifically possible. Therefore, he wrote, he was no longer going to take "scientifically disproven" claims seriously.

As circulation soared, Palmer began devoting more and more space in each issue of Amazing Stories to the Shaver Mystery. He even dropped stories by Ray Bradbury and Henry Hasse to make room for more Shaverism. The long-running science quiz was dropped, and in September 1945 Palmer instituted the feature "Report From the Forgotten Past?". It was a readers' forum, dedicated to discussion of the Shaver Mystery. (Note: To emphasize that Palmer no longer considered Shaverism theoretical, the question mark was dropped from the title of the feature after September 1945.) A new feature, "What Man Can Imagine", began running in February 1946 which encouraged readers to discuss new scientific theories, new belief systems, metaphysics, mythology, and conspiracy theories.

=== Popularity of the Shaver Mystery ===
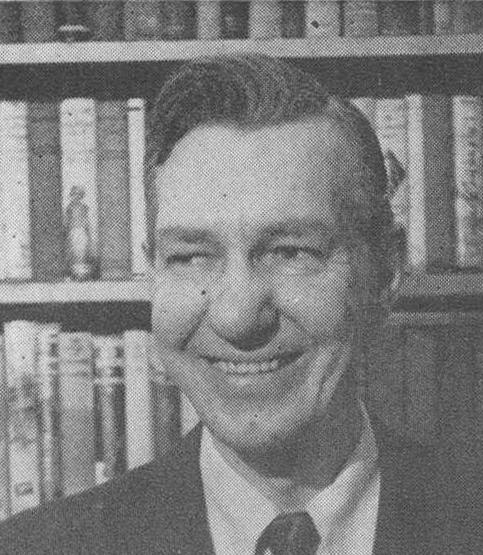
Roger Phillips Graham, a.k.a. "Rog Phillips", was hired by Palmer to write Shaver stories, intervene with fans opposed to the Shaver Mystery, and run "The Club House" column in Amazing Stories.

New writers were brought in to write "Shaver stories". The first of these was Roger Phillips Graham, who wrote under the pen name "Rog Phillips". Graham claimed to be a Titan (one of Shaver's alien races), firmly believed in the teaching of Oahspe, said he could see invisible beings, and told Palmer that he received mathematical equations from "beyond his own mind". His first Shaver story, "The Shaver Mystery" appeared in Amazing Stories in February 1946. Other new "Shaver" writers included Vincent Gaddis, L. Taylor Hansen, and John McCabe Moore. The husband and wife writing team of John and Dorothy de Courcy began to write Shaver stories as well, the first of which appeared in May 1946. In their letters to the editor and in editorials, they documented their fights against Shaver's evil alien "Deros".

By the middle of 1946, Amazing Stories sold between 240,000 and 320,000 copies per issue. (Note: No independent circulation audit was made of Ziff Davis publications at this time. Sales figures vary depending on the source. Ziff Davis records indicate that the February 1946 issue of Amazing Stories sold 261,611 copies. Richard Toronto estimated that at its peak it sold 170,000 copies per issue. Chester Geier claimed that the magazine's sales during the Shaver period were only 90,000 per issue.) Both Palmer and Hamling claimed that as many as 50,000 new readers picked up the magazine due to its Shaver stories. Shaverism was so popular that Palmer ran Shaver stories in Fantastic Stories and Mammoth Adventures to meet the demand.

=== Backlash against Shaverism ===
As Amazing Stories became less about science fiction and more about the Shaver Mystery, a backlash began.

The popularity of the Shaver Mystery and the divisive response to it drew the attention of the mainstream national news media. In September 1946, Harper's Magazine ran an article by scholar and Time magazine creative director William S. Baring-Gould which excoriated Palmer for pushing a hoax on his readership. Baring-Gould also scoffed at the underlying premises of the Shaver Mystery. Baring-Gould also claimed Palmer's stand on the truth of the "mystery" was calculated to be wishy-washy. This led to an exchange of letters in the magazine's December 1946 issue. Palmer wrote, "I believe in the 'Mystery' for what it is. Every word uttered editorially in Amazing Stories is my firm conviction, not any attempt at a hoax." Baring-Gould said he was glad to hear it.

The fan attacks on Palmer also worsened. Fan Don Wilson wrote a letter outlining the scientific criticisms of Shaverism, which was published in the December 1946 issue of the fanzine Vampire. Palmer lost his temper and wrote Wilson a scathing personal letter. Wilson gave it to Vampire, which published it, embarrassing Palmer. Forrest Ackerman circulated a petition asking that Amazing Stories stop running Shaver tales. Fantasy Times, a leading fanzine, demanded that Palmer quit, and the fanzine Fantasy Commentator accused Palmer of turning science fiction into "a plaything for every semi-sane crackpot". The Queens Science Fiction League, a highly influential fan organization founded in 1937 by Sam Moskowitz and James V. Taurasi Sr., condemned the Shaver "mystery".

Important people in the mainstream publishing industry privately began to criticize Ziff Davis for allowing Palmer to publish about the Shaver Mystery. Initially, William Ziff ignored the complaints, as Amazing Stories dominated the science fiction magazine market and was making a significant profit. (Note: Palmer claimed that Ziff Davis made $500,000 off the Shaver Mystery.) In late autumn of 1946, Ziff received a letter signed by a large number of important science fiction fans and writers. (Note: The letter has never been located, nor the names of the signatories identified.) The letter claimed Palmer was now pushing an essentially religious belief system to the exclusion of literature, and strongly criticized this editorial approach. Ziff became deeply worried. In late 1946, Ziff and Davis met to discuss the matter. The two owners decided that Amazing Stories could continue publishing Shaver stories, but only if Palmer explicitly labeled them as fiction. Palmer reluctantly agreed.

Palmer pushed back against the criticism. In the January 1947 issue of Amazing Stories, he ran a nonfiction article by Margaret Rogers titled "I Have Been in the Caves".

In the February 1947 issue of Amazing Stories, Palmer wrote that the Shaver Mystery was about to solved. In a letter to the editor ostensibly written by Ziff Davis assistant editor Chester Geier (but in fact written by Palmer), the formation of the Shaver Mystery Club was announced. It was a group dedicated to collecting evidence that would corroborate Shaverism. (Note: Palmer and Shaver had discussed setting up a supportive organization in a series of letters written in 1944 and 1945, but nothing had come of this.) Palmer had not informed Geier of his plan, but Geier agreed to take on the task because it was a paid position. (Note: The club was jointly funded by Ziff Davis and Richard Shaver.) Palmer had collected the names and addresses of readers who had written positive letters about Shaverism to Amazing Stories; Geier used this list to ask them to subscribe to the Shaver Mystery Club magazine for $1 an issue. He soon had 3,000 subscribers. Palmer did little to generate stories for the club magazine or cultivate interest in the club. The Shaver Mystery Club magazine was published quarterly. Reaction to the club was so poor that after a year, subscribership fell by half. Geier resigned as Shaver Mystery Club president in May 1948, and Palmer transferred club management to Richard Shaver. Shaver managed to put out a few mimeographed issues, and then closed the club.

=== High point of Shaverism, and links to the UFO sightings craze ===
1947 proved to be the high point of the Shaver Mystery. Palmer published 15 Shaver Mystery stories in Amazing Stories in all of 1947. Most of these came in the June 1947 issue, which was devoted completely to Shaverism. This was fewer stories than the magazine had run in 1946, and Palmer initially blamed the lack of production on a printer's strike. He also said the all-Shaver issue had been repeatedly attacked by "Dero" tamper rays, causing typographical problems and much more. He continued to make outlandish Shaverist claims, however. In June 1947, he said the United States was about to be invaded by a "fifth column from hell", and that foreign governments had obtained "cavern mech" which they were going to use on America.

Palmer also linked the Shaver Mystery to the emerging flying saucer craze. A "flying saucer craze" erupted in June 1947, and more than 850 reports of flying saucers were made in American newspapers over the next few months. Palmer ran numerous stories about flying saucers in Amazing Stories to take advantage of the trend. In Amazing Stories in October 1947, he claimed that UFO sightings were proof that Shaverism was real. Shaver had written about a Lemurian "rollat", or anti-gravity machine, and Palmer claimed that this was a flying saucer. Amazing Stories first mentioned flying saucers in its June 1946 issue. Palmer, however, claimed that he'd known about them for years, but had declined to publish about them in order to avoid being pranked.

Palmer followed through on his pledge to Ziff and Davis. In his editorials and features, he began putting key Shaverist words in quotation marks, and added question marks after some words to emphasize that they might be fiction.

=== Maury Island hoax and the end of Shaverism ===
Palmer's fast-growing interest in UFOs led to his involvement in the Maury Island hoax. Palmer had become friends with aviator Kenneth Arnold, who claimed that he saw nine flying saucers near Mount Rainier in the state of Washington on June 24, 1947. Palmer had heard rumors that two "harbor patrol" officers had seen a flying saucer dumping material in Puget Sound near Maury Island, a few miles north of Tacoma. Palmer paid Arnold to investigate. Fred Crisman, Harold Dahl, and two other men were interviewed by an overly credulous Arnold, and Crisman attempted to pass off common rocks as "alien debris". The United States Air Force, then investigating UFO sightings, sent two officers to talk to the men. The two Air Force officers died on August 1, 1947, when the aircraft they were piloting crashed near Kelso, Washington.

Two Air Force officers visited the Ziff Davis officers in September 1947 and interviewed Palmer about his role in the Maury Island hoax. (Note: Palmer, who believed in conspiracy theories and pushed them in his own magazines, later claimed that "Deros" disguised as U.S. Secret Service agents first visited Ziff Davis in December 1944, and that "government agents" had often secretively visited the publishing house throughout World War II and during the post-war years.) The Air Force contacted William Ziff and claimed that Palmer had instigated the hoax. Now a plane had been lost and two men were dead.

Palmer's limited involvement in the Maury Island hoax proved too much for William Ziff, who told Palmer in the autumn of 1947 to stop publishing Shaver stories. Ziff also cancelled a planned special issue of Amazing Stories dedicated to UFOs. (Note: Palmer would later claim that government agents and pressured Ziff into "suppressing" the flying saucer issue.)

=== "Proof" of the Shaver Mystery ends Shaverism ===
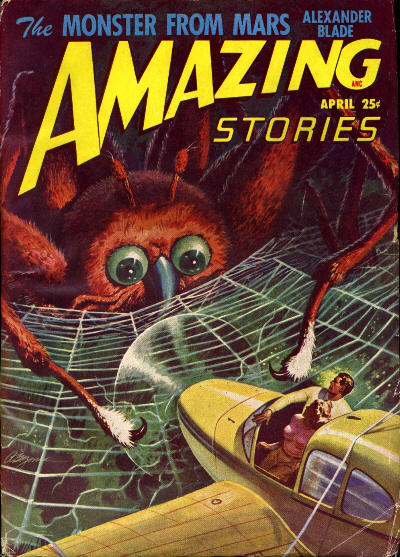
The Shaver Mystery came to an end in the April 1948 issue of Amazing Stories.

In Amazing Stories in January 1948, Palmer again promised that proof of the veracity of the Shaver Mystery was coming. (Note: Amazing Stories had a production schedule of three months. Ziff's shut-down order to Palmer must have come no later than October 1947.) There were no Shaver stories in that issue. Instead, Palmer ran two essays by Richard Shaver in which he claimed "Deros" were taking over the world. Palmer also ran a severely critical analysis of the Shaver Mystery written by anti-Shaver fans, and a new column by "Robert Paul Kidwell" which highlighted debunking evidence. (The "column" ran only once, and "Kidwell" was one of Palmer's pen names.)

The editorial tide turned against Shaverism. The letter columns in the January, February, and March issues of Amazing Stories were dominated by anti-Shaver readers. No Shaver stories or essays ran in the February 1948 issue of Amazing. A major story by Shaver himself ran in March 1948, but Palmer explicitly called it fiction. In "The Observatory", Palmer claimed that he had documents, objects, and photographs that "proved" the "Shaver Hypothesis" and that this story would run in the next issue. By this time, most of the essays in Amazing Stories were about flying saucer sightings, anomalous phenomena, and mysticism, and there was very little discussion of science fiction.

When the April 1948 issue of Amazing Stories was published, it contained no essays or features about the Shaver Mystery. Instead, Palmer claimed that another media outlet was going to break the story, and so he had decided to return Amazing to its science fiction roots. (Note: In Mystic magazine in 1955, Palmer claimed that Ziff Davis executives saw Shaverism as a "threat to their reasoning powers" and cancelled it out of a fear of the unknown.) Shaverism no longer appeared in Amazing Stories, and no proof of the Shaver Mystery was ever published anywhere. In an attempt to win back anti-Shaver readers, Palmer organized a few feature in the magazine in March 1948. Called "The Club House", it was a letters forum for those who opposed Shaverism. Palmer had long relied on Roger Phillips Graham to attend fan conventions and attempt to calm angry anti-Shaver readers. He had Graham edit "The Club House" and write its responses to readers. Graham turned the feature into a solid source of fan news.

The last major Shaver essay to appear in Amazing Stories came in May 1948. It had no byline, but was likely written by Palmer. It offered three "proofs" of the mystery: 1) All matter has radioactivity, which causes aging; 2) Space is filled with the particles of disintegrated suns, and this causes gravity; and 3) Flying saucers visit Earth to contact the Deros and Teros.

Shaver stories continued to run throughout 1948 and 1949, but they were depicted as fiction. Palmer introduced Shaver's "Daughter of the Night" (published in December 1948) as a "terrific yarn", not as truth. None of the Shaver stories that ran in 1949 were said to be based on "thought memories". Palmer asked readers to write in to determine support for running more Shaver Mystery tales. Only 138 bothered to do so, and even Palmer admitted in the spring of 1949 that Shaverism was ending.

== Relocation to Wisconsin, and third spinal injury ==
On July 7, 1949, Palmer bought a 124-acre (50 ha) farm located at County Trunk A and Clinton Road near Amherst, Wisconsin. (Note: The farm was isolated from the Chicago publishing industry, but that was the point: Palmer believed the "Deros" were less active in rural areas. Both men also feared that nuclear war would soon engulf the planet, and believed rural Wisconsin was one of the safer places to be.) The farm was quite near the home in Lanark, Wisconsin, to which Richard Shaver had moved earlier in the year.

In May or June 1950, Palmer fell on some stairs leading to his basement. (Note: Palmer later editorialized in October 1950 that "Deros" had caused him to stumble.) His back was broken, and he was in critical condition. He was taken to Saint Francis Hospital in Evanston, Illinois, where he spent several months undergoing rehabilitation. (Note: Nadis says that Palmer underwent surgery at Saint Francis. Toronto, however, says doctors refused to operate. Palmer claimed to have been operated on by a team that included Dr. Gaenslen, but Hamling (to whom he told the story) thought this was a lie.) He did not leave the hospital until about August 1950.

The accident left Palmer permanently, partially disabled, and for the rest of his life he found it difficult to walk. He was in constant pain, and his right leg was left weaker than his left.

Palmer moved his family to the Wisconsin farm in November 1950. The Palmer family lived in a partially renovated farmhouse while they built a modern stone home on the property. Palmer claimed that he was able to communicate with "Teros", and asked them to help with his farm. The farm was the site of paranormal activity, according to Palmer: He saw dwarf-like hunchbacks on the roads at night, and claimed to have seen a UFO near the house in February 1952. He also claimed that his farm was on the site of an ancient lakebed, and that a Native American village formerly existed where the farmhouse stood.

Ray was quite active in the Amherst community. In 1963, he was a member of Tomorrow River District School Board, a vice president of the Portage County Fair Association, a director of the Amherst Development Corp., and a past president of the Amherst Lions Club.

== Clark Publishing ==
The flying saucer craze and Shaver controversy convinced Palmer that there was substantial readership for magazines about the unexplained. In late 1947, he and Curtis Fuller established Clark Publishing and Palmer began laying plans to quit Ziff Davis. Palmer put up his own money, but Fuller financed his portion through a contribution from a wealthy uncle. Palmer needed the Ziff Davis income until Clark Publishing was up and running, so he ran the company and edited its magazines under the pseudonym "Robert N. Webster". He did not reveal that he was "Robert N. Webster" until he attended the 7th World Science Fiction Convention (Cinvention) in early September 1949.

Clark Publishing initially operated out of a large wooden building at 806 Dempster Street in Evanston. Palmer operated a mail-order bookstore, Venture Bookstore, out of the same building. Established shortly after the first issue of Fate, it sold mystic, occult, psychic, and spiritual books and paraphernalia.

Palmer resigned from all his positions at Ziff Davis in December 1949. (Note: Richard Toronto places the date of his departure as September 1949.)

At the 7th World Science Fiction Convention, Raymond Palmer met Bea Mahaffey, a science fiction fan from Cleveland, Ohio. He hired her as his secretary at Clark Publishing. Palmer's 1949 accident made it painful for him to travel, and Mahaffey became his surrogate at fan events. Clark Publishing's offices were still located in Evanston, and Mahaffey ran them. She initially cultivated high-quality writers for Palmer's magazines like Isaac Asimov, Fredric Brown, and Theodore Sturgeon. They tended to publish their worst stories for Palmer Publishing, work they could not sell elsewhere, and eventually Mahaffey came around to Palmer's view that low-brow adventure and romance stories made for high circulation. In time, Mahaffey co-edited Other Worlds with Palmer. Fred Nadis credits Mahaffey with turning Other Worlds into one of the more respected science fiction magazines of the 1950s.

In 1952, Palmer co-authored the book The Coming of the Saucers with Kenneth Arnold. It was issued by Clark Publishing.

Clark Publishing originally contracted out its printing needs. After the move to Amherst, Marjorie Palmer began keeping the company accounts, tracking mail, and managing subscriptions. Ray Palmer's office was initially a room in the farmhouse he rented. Once the modern stone house was finished, he used a room in the house as well as a converted chicken coop. Clark Publishing purchased its own full-color printing presses and moved to a building on Main Street in Amherst next to a bakery. By 1963, the company had moved into the old Amherst Elementary School. The firm had seven employees.

=== Amherst Press, Bell Publications, and Palmer Publications ===
In 1951, Palmer established a book publisher, Amherst Press. Amherst Press specialized in flying saucer books and published George Hunt Williamson's Other Tongues—Other Flesh in 1953. Williamson had fascist beliefs, and ties to William Dudley Pelley's fascist Silver Legion of America, and the book contained elements of antisemitism.

Palmer entered a partnership with an unidentified Chicago businessman and created Bell Publications in 1953. Bell began publishing Universe Science Fiction in June 1953. It was in Universe in June 1953 that Palmer published the first science fiction story sympathetic to homosexuality, Theodore Sturgeon's "The World Well Lost". The success of that new magazine led Palmer to cease publication of Other Worlds. He launched a successor to Other Worlds, with essentially the same editorial policy, in October 1953, titling it Science Stories.

Palmer's business partner pulled out of the partnership in 1955. Palmer founded a new company, Palmer Publications, and acquired Science Stories and Universe Science Fiction. Both publications ceased in 1955, and Palmer Publications began publishing Other Worlds again. The numbering of issues of Other Worlds took up where the original Other Worlds left off.

Over the years, Palmer Publications issued a number of books. Many were by authors writing about paranormal phenomena Palmer was interested in. Some were by readers of his magazines, and a number were works by local people. One of the most important books he published was William A. Hyman's Space Law, an important legal treatise on the law of outer space. Palmer Publications also printed a number of magazines for other organizations, including one by the American Association of University Women.

In 1975, Palmer Publicans began publishing a local newspaper, the Tomorrow River Times. It was established in honor the American bicentennial. It ceased publication a few years after Palmer's death.

=== Fate magazine ===
Fate was conceived of by Palmer and Fuller. It was first magazine published by Clark. Eight issues had already appeared by the time Palmer left Ziff Davis.

The first issue of the digest size magazine appeared in the spring of 1948. To build a subscription base, Palmer purchased a mailing list from Wing Anderson, an occult author and entrepreneur. (Note: Among his many other endeavors, Anderson sold thousands of copies of Oahspe. He also founded group known as the Essenes of Kosmon, a religious organization dedicated to spreading the teachings of Oahspe.) In an ethically suspect move, Palmer plugged Fate in Amazing Stories.

Palmer's editorial approach to Fate made no attempt at respectability. The covers featured scantily-clad women, and advertisers included the Rosicrucians, Brotherhood of the White Temple, Shaver Mystery novellas, and various books for sale by spiritualist/occult bookseller Wing Anderson. Palmer used the same business model he had developed at Amazing Stories: editorial written in an overly friendly, informal style; a large amount of letters from readers, and short features.

Ray intended for Fate to publish "documented" articles. He claimed that if documentation was lacking, Fate would point this out and take a neutral stand on the truthfulness of the matter. The magazine covered alternative medicine, anomalous archeological discoveries, automatic writing, belief in the survival of personality after death, cryptozoology (particularly sea serpents and Yeti), divination, flying saucer sightings, Fortean events, ghosts, mental telepathy, New religious movements, predictive dreaming, psychedelic drugs, and many paranormal topics. A few Shaver Mystery stories appeared, but once Palmer left Ziff Davis and worked full-time at Fate these no longer were run.

Fate became a key magazine for those who believed in flying saucers. The first issue of Fate featured a painting of UFOs harassing a small red civilian airplane. The cover story was Kenneth Arnold's first-hand account of his 1947 UFO sighting, "I Did See the Flying Disks!" Inside was an article by aeronautical expert John C. Ross, "What Were the Flying Doughnuts?" George Adamski, who claimed to be a contactee, sent his first photos of UFOs to Fate in 1950.

Through Fate, Palmer was instrumental in popularizing belief in flying saucers. Fate was ridiculed by freelance journalist Sidney Shalett in the April and May 1949 editions of the Saturday Evening Post. Palmer accused the Air Force of intimidating the magazine into writing the story, and all but writing it.

Fate's readership rose to 120,000 per issue. Chester S. Geier began freelancing as an editor at Fate in early 1952, and joined the magazine as a full-time assistant editor in May. Fuller's uncle, although a silent investor in Clark Publishing, was demanding that Curtis Fuller take more editorial control, do beginning in 1952 Palmer's editorials in Fate began to be replaced more and more frequently by Fuller's "I See By the Papers" column. By late 1953, Ray Palmer was no longer engaged in any editorial or publishing capacity in Fate, and he sold his share to Fuller in 1955.

=== Other Worlds magazine ===
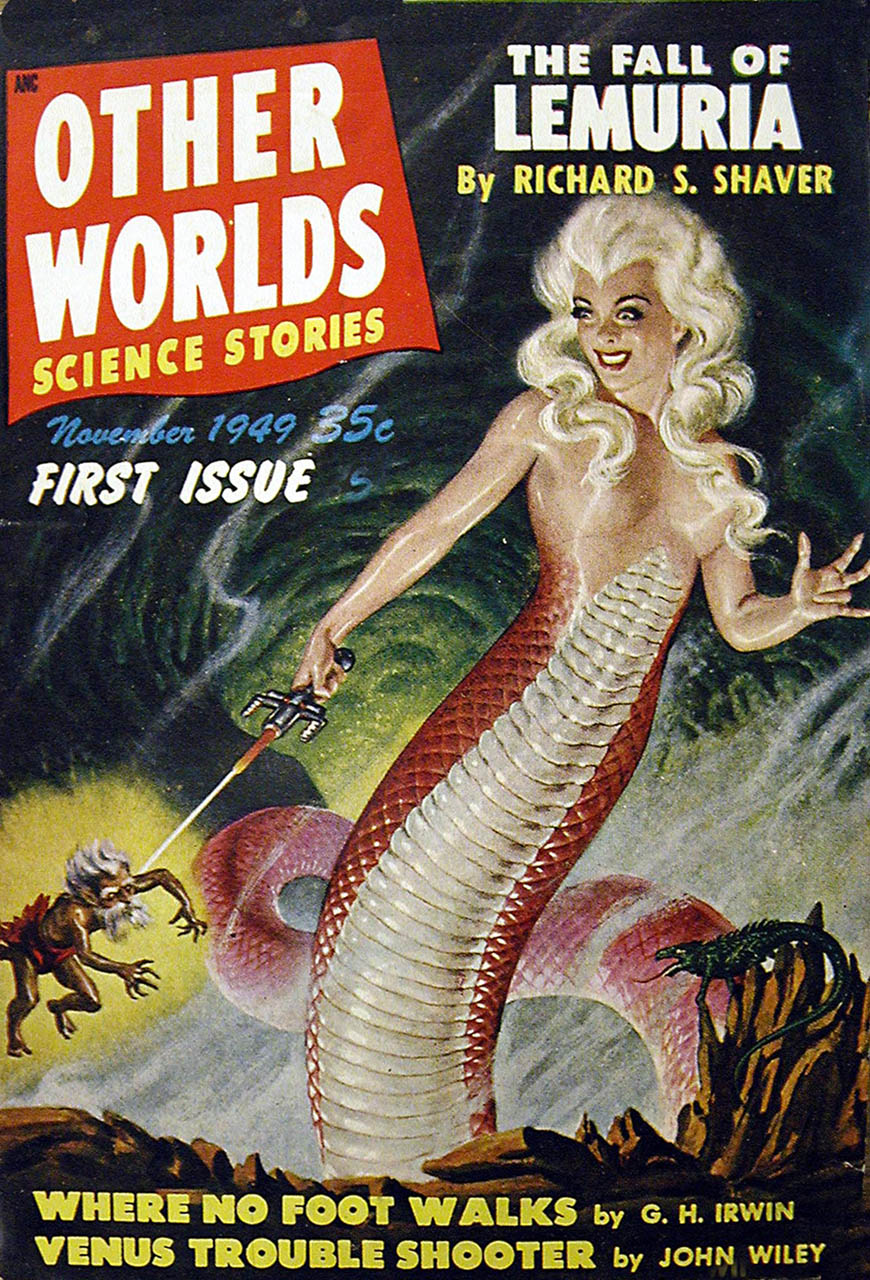
The first issue of Other Worlds Science Stories, cover dated November 1949.

Clark Publications published its first, and best, science fiction magazine, Other Worlds Science Stories, in November 1949. Hamling loaned Palmer $10,000 to get the magazine off the ground. Palmer said in an editorial in the first issue that he intended to publish stories running the gamut from the high-brow work found in Astounding Science Fiction to the sensational "life on other planets" work of Planet Stories.

The first issue of Other Worlds featured Shaver's "The Fall of Lemuria", three stories by Roger P. Graham (appearing under the pen name Rog Phillips), and one by Palmer (using the pen name G.H. Irwin). The Shaver Mystery had grown stale, however, and Graham's was the only Shaver story published that year in any of Palmer's magazines.

=== Other Worlds becomes Flying Saucers ===
Other Stories readership began dropping sharply in 1954. To save the magazine, Palmer decided to begin publication of a new series of Tarzan stories set on Mars. He believed this mashup of Tarzan and the John Carter of Mars milieu would bring in 20,000 new readers. The estate of Edgar Rice Burroughs, which held the copyright to both Tarzan and John Carter, considered the plan copyright infringement and issued a cease-and-desist letter to Clark Publishing. At first, Palmer pleaded in November 1955 for the Burroughs estate to permit the mashup. When this failed, Palmer tried to transform the disagreement into a crusade for creativity and "fan rights". This failed, and no series was written.

1957 proved to be a turning point in Palmer's magazines. The collapse of the pulp fiction industry had been coming for almost a decade: Street & Smith canceled almost all of its pulp magazines in 1949. Most pulp magazines were no longer profitable, and American News Company went bankrupt in 1957. Palmer's magazines also suffered financially and in 1957 he was forced to fire Bea Mahaffey.

In May 1957, Palmer retitled Other Worlds, changing the name to Flying Saucers from Other Worlds. The new focus was UFOs, and the magazine ceased to run fiction after the September 1957 issue. The name changed again to Flying Saucers, The Magazine of Space Conquest in July 1958, and became Flying Saucers, Mysteries of the Space Age in October 1958.

Palmer said Flying Saucers, a bimonthly, had 20,000 readers in 1963, of whom a quarter were subscribers. He named Helga Onan associate editor of Flying Saucers in 1963, only minimally continuing his involvement with it.

Gradually, Palmer began taking the position in Flying Saucers that UFOs were Shaver Mystery vehicles. He began promoting the Hollow Earth theory that the interior of the planet could be reached via gigantic holes at the north and south poles. After reading F. Amadeo Giannini's 1959 book Worlds Beyond the Poles, which claimed that "moving beyond" the poles led to celestial lands, Palmer began claiming that UFOs were coming not from outer space but out of the Antarctic hole. He even claimed in a December 1959 article that an Antarctic expedition had proven it. In his own twist on the Hollow Earth legend, Palmer alleged that the Earth was actually shaped like a giant Möbius strip or perhaps doughnut-shaped. In an attempt to show that he was giving editorial space to "both sides", he printed Delmar H. Bryant's article "Hollow Earth Hoax" in the April 1965 issue of Flying Saucers. Bryant attacked both Giannini and Raymond Bernard, author of The Hollow Earth. (Bernard was really Walter Siegmeister.) Bryant's article "refuted" the claim by Giannini and others that there was a hole at the north pole. It was, Bryant said, at the south pole. Bryant accused Palmer of helping to spread and add to Giannini's story; Palmer, in turn, exposed Bryan as Walter Siegmeister, claimed he was engaged in a real estate scam, and accused Siegmeister of wanting to found a dictatorship.

In 1965, Palmer shifted his claim and began arguing that UFOs were actually visitors from solid layers of Earth's outer atmosphere. (Note: For a brief time, in Flying Saucers in January 1966, Palmer asserted that the polar holes were time portals or somehow "abstract".) He rapidly reinterpreted the Shaver Mystery in Oahspean terms. Oahspe said that the Earth's atmosphere was 180,000 miles (290,000 km) high, and contained multiple "heavens". Each layer was occupied by a different "race" of dead souls, each race having achieved different levels of enlightenment. Dead souls migrated to these "solid heavens", which were very much like Earth, with schools, factories, money, and various types of professions. As people learned new skills in a lower heaven, they progressed to a higher one. Ultimately, people could become gods, having learned the skill to building an entire cosmos. Oahspe claimed that these "Atmosphereans" built "arrow ships" to travel to Earth. Ray Palmer was among the first of the UFO believers to argue that flying saucers were not extraterrestrial but rather spiritual.

Palmer's new claims about UFOs harmed his friendship with Richard Shaver. Shaver rejected anything that hinted at spiritualism, and he felt Palmer had distorted Shaverism. Palmer replied that he thought Shaver was under attack by "Deros". The disagreement between the two worsened over time, and by 1971 Richard Shaver was openly accusing Ray Palmer of turning every idea he encountered into mystical and religious "claptrap".

Palmer fixated on the idea that flying saucers originated in heaven, and for the rest of his life sought to synthesize Oahspe with the Shaver Mystery.

About July 1966, Flying Saucers shifted from a glue-bound to a cheaper stapled format.

In 1971, Raymond Palmer suffered a severe bout of influenza which left him in frail health. He hired James Oberg to edit Flying Saucers.

In the fall 1976 of Search, another of his magazines, Palmer abandoned the idea that flying saucers are real. He asked his readers to consider if they were "intruders" instead. At UFO conference in Chicago in 1977 just before his death, Palmer again implied that flying saucers were not real. Science fiction, he said had distorted the public's view of reality, leading people to invent flying saucers.

Flying Saucers continued publication until June 1976.

=== Mystic and Search ===
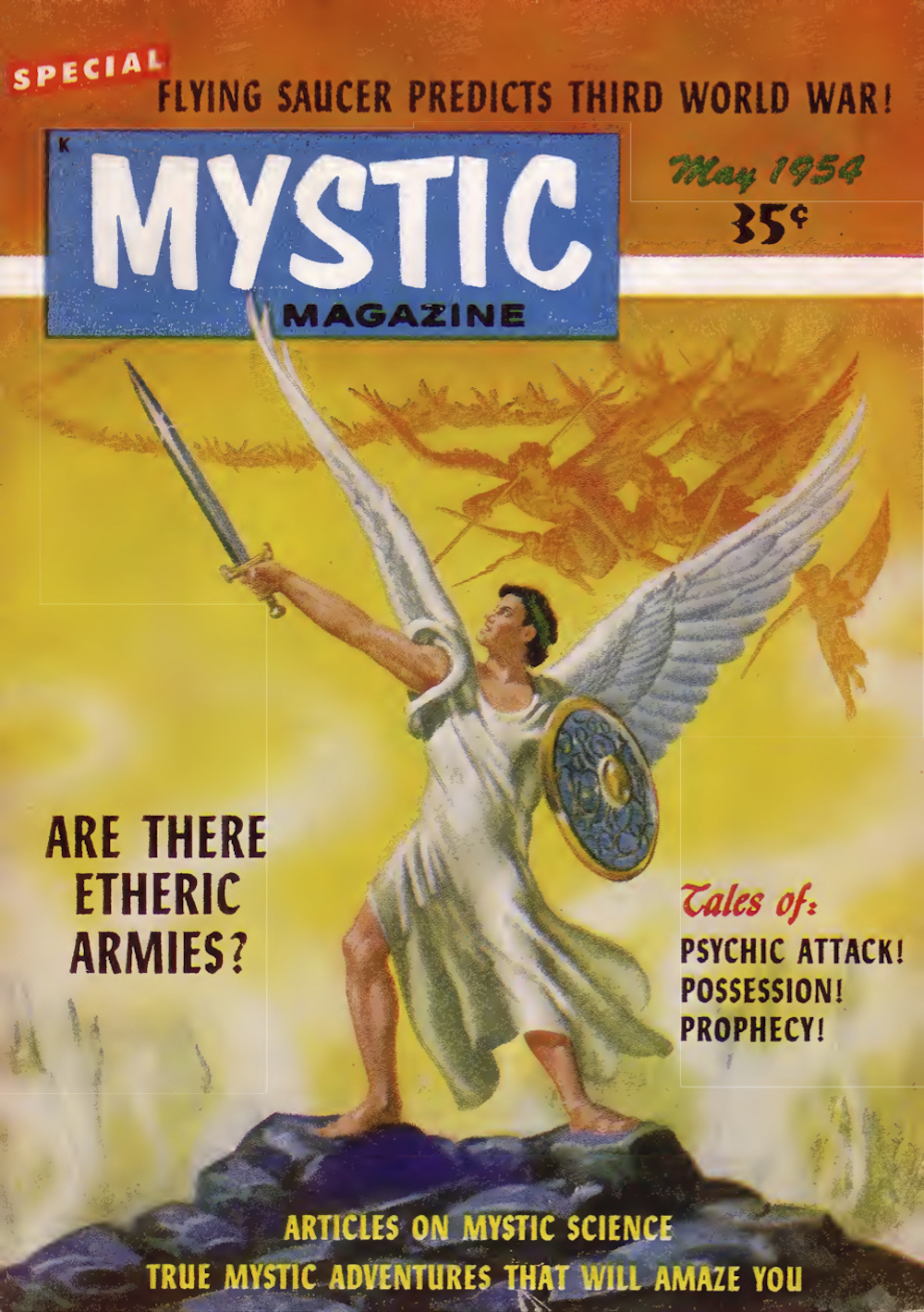
Mystic magazine for May 1954.

Raymond Palmer began publishing Mystic magazine in November 1953. His motivation for starting the new publication may have been a waning interest in Fate, or it may have been because Fate was losing readership and Palmer felt only a new magazine with a different approach could survive.

Mystic was bimonthly and primarily a contactee magazine, although Palmer tended to publish articles about anything that interested him. His editorial approach was that Mystic was a magazine of theory, and its articles did not have to be scientifically rational or documented.

Until he severed his connection with it, Fate gave Palmer a steady supply of unused material for publishing in Mystic. The first issue contained Orfeo Angelucci's article "I Traveled in a Flying Saucer". Angelucci also wrote "I Meet the Flying Saucer Man" in the May 1954 issue and "My Awakening on Another Planet" in the October 1954 issue. Readers made racist attacks on Angelucci for being Italian and called his claims lies. Palmer later edited Angelucci's stories into a book, The Secret of the Saucers, published in 1955. Hannes Bok, a noted science fiction artist, wrote articles for Mystic about astrology and mandalas.

Finances for Mystic were precarious, and in August 1955 Palmer announced he would no longer pay authors for any work that appeared there.

Mystic was renamed Search in October 1956. Readers began writing letters about the Shaver Mystery as soon as Mystic appeared, and Palmer claimed hundreds, if not thousands, of people were Shaver Mystery fans.

About 1949, Richard Shaver became interested in rocks around his Wisconsin home. He began seeing ancient writing and artwork and much more in them, and began calling them "song stones" and "picture rocks". Shaver claimed the rocks were "books" written by ancient alien races known as Giants, Amazons, and Mers, and a record of an antediluvian civilization that existed around Amherst. Initially, he thinly sliced rocks and sold the slices to believers in Shaverism. Later, he began photographing the rock, and then painting the images he saw on canvas. He called the art Rokfogo. Shaver stories and Shaverist elder race stories, found in the rocks, and photos of Shaver's rocks began appearing in Mystic.

Readership of the bimonthly Search was roughly 20,000 per issue in 1960, and 19,000 in 1961. Palmer claimed the magazine sold 15,000 copies via newsstand and had 5,000 subscribers in 1963.

In 1960, Richard Shaver told Palmer that he had written a comprehensive history of Shaverism's ancient races, and a guide to how "Deros" and "Teros" behaved in the modern world. Shaver had given up on his magnum opus, however, and he asked if Palmer would complete it, edit it, and publish the manuscript. Palmer swiftly agreed. There were 16 paperback volumes in what came to be known as The Hidden World. Three of them contained personal correspondence between Shaver and Palmer, which Palmer had published without Shaver's consent. Shaver was deeply angered by their publication. The first four volumes of The Hidden World, released in 1961, sold 5,000 copies each. Sales quickly tapered off, however. Each of the four volumes released in 1962 found just 3,000 buyers. The four volumes issued in 1963 were purchased by just 1,700 people, and only 900 purchased the final four volumes in 1964. Richard Shaver received no income from the publication.

Did Raymond Palmer believe that Shaver's rocks really contained ancient writing and images of the distant past? Palmer shifted his position throughout the 1960s, but by 1969 was claiming that the images really were there. He even said that Oahspe made references to the rock images.

Palmer named Helga Onan associate editor of Search and stepped back from most active involvement with the magazine.

In 1964, Palmer and Shaver engaged in a public dispute in the pages of the fanzine Searchlight. The dispute began when Shaver claimed that Ray Palmer had played no creative role in his Shaver stories. Palmer responded by attacking Shaver's writing as very poor, and that Ziff Davis would never have run "A Warning to Future Man" unless Palmer made significant changes to it. Palmer reran the exchange of letters in Search in November 1966.

About July 1966, Search shifted from a glue-bound to a cheaper stapled format.

Palmer poor health after 1971 led him to turn editorship of the magazine over to his wife, Marjorie. He limited his involvement to writing one editorial and one article per issue.

In 1976, Search merged with Flying Saucers. When the magazine folded in 1977, its readership stood at just 3,000. (Note: Total readership for all of Palmer's publications in 1977 was just 20,000.)

=== Other Clark publications ===
Clark began publishing Imagination in October 1950, but sold it to Hamling's Greenleaf Publishing at the end of the year. Palmer edited four issues of Imagination for Greenleaf Publishing, leaving that position in February 1951.

In 1963, Palmer purchased Space News, a magazine about astronomy, the space race, and rocketry. It had been founded by his old friend, Otto Binder. Poor health after 1971 saw Palmer turn over the editorship of the magazine to James Oberg. Palmer published Space World magazine until his death.

Palmer began publishing Forum in 1966. Also called Ray Palmer's Forum, the stapled, small format, 32-page magazine printed on good-quality paper initially appeared biweekly but later switched to monthly. Forum was essentially one long letters-to-the-editor column. It usually ran a single editorial by Ray Palmer, and occasionally featured articles by others. It contained no artwork; the cover consisted of a black-and-white drawing of the Roman Forum and, later, Auguste Rodin's statue The Thinker. Available by subscription only, it began with about 2,200 readers. At its height, Forum had roughly 3,000 subscribers. Palmer intended for Forum to be more outspoken and even sexually explicit than a newsstand publication could be. Topics covered included conspiracy theories about the Bilderberg Group, John F. Kennedy assassination, and Federal Reserve; if there is sex in heaven; and reincarnation. New Shaver material also appeared in Forum.

Ray Palmer's Newsletter was the smallest of Palmer's magazines. It was little more than a catalog for his mail-order bookstore.

Forum and Ray Palmer's Newsletter merged in 1966.

== Spiritual publications ==
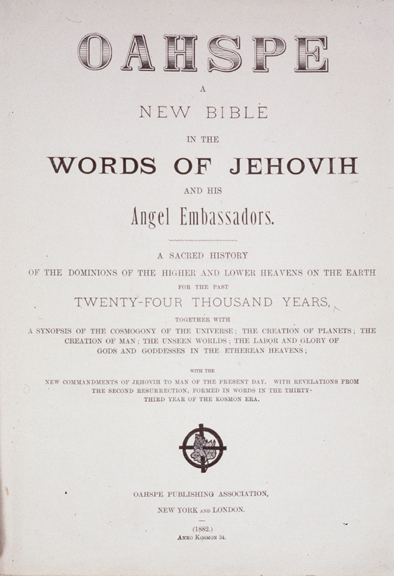
Title page of the 1882 original edition of Oahspe: A New Bible.

Palmer's interest in spirituality and alternative explanations of reality was reflected in his choice of publications.

He was especially dedicated to spreading awareness and availability of Oahspe. Palmer's biographer, Fred Nadis, says that Palmer learned about the book from readers of Amazing Stories. He and his wife read it aloud to one another and frequently discussed it. Palmer first mentioned Oahspe in response to a letter to the editor in the "Report From the Forgotten Past" column in Amazing Stories for September 1945. (Note: This indicates that Palmer knew of and had read the book some time prior to July 1945. The lead time for Amazing Stories was three months.) He mentioned it at length in "Report From the Forgotten Past" in December 1945 and again in his "The Observatory" editorial in February 1946. Palmer claimed he was studying the book in May 1946. From the mid-1940s onward, Palmer frequently editorialized that he believed the claims made in the religious text, although his friend and assistant editor at Ziff Davis, Howard Browne, was convinced that Palmer did not believe it.

About the early 1970s, Palmer Publications won a contract to print three magazines published by the Assembly of God church.

== FBI investigation ==
In 1948, Palmer began to crusade against mutually assured destruction and nuclear weapons. In 1953, Walter Winchell gave the Federal Bureau of Investigation (FBI) a letter denouncing Palmer as a communist propagandist. He accused Palmer of publishing the Roger Phillips Graham story "Frontiers Beyond the Sun" and the E.K. Jarvis story "Death Beyond the Veil" (both in Amazing Stories, January 1953). He also accused Other Worlds of advocating "peace at any price" communist propaganda. The FBI ran background checks on Palmer's employees but found nothing incriminatory.

A second complaint was made to the FBI in 1954. The anti-communist group Aware, Inc. sent a letter to the FBI accusing Palmer of anti-Americanism in an editorial he wrote in Mystic. The FBI declined to investigate the claim.

On July 19, 1954, FBI Special Agents interviewed Palmer after he ran a story, "Venusians Walk Our Streets", by science fiction author Frank M. Vest. The story claimed the FBI laboratories were researching a mystery metal from Venus. The FBI did a records search, and found that their laboratories had never received any such metal and that no such research was being performed. When confronted with this falsehood, Palmer claimed that he did not catch the FBI reference and the "mystery metal", in his final edit, but quickly apologized for the mistake, and offered to run a retraction. Palmer told the Special Agents that the magazine received around 50 letters about flying saucer sightings each week, and that he forwarded the most feasible-sounding ones to the Central Intelligence Agency's Chicago office.

The FBI released Palmer's FBI file on June 22, 2018, under the Freedom of Information Act.

In 1962, Palmer printed an image of a $100 bill on the cover of Search. A United States Secret Service official sent him a letter warning him against counterfeiting. Palmer transformed this into a raid on his office by the Secret and local police.

For the rest of his life, Palmer stridently claimed that he was being harassed by U.S. government law enforcement agencies. In the 1970s, he claimed that this began in 1941 when he was arrested as a spy by border control agents as he attempted to drive into Canada. None of his friends, and few of his readers, believed this new story.

== Pornography allegations ==
The move by Ziff Davis to New York City left many of the company's editors and authors at loose ends, as they were unwilling to make the move as well. Among these was assistant editor William Hamling. In 1955, Hamling founded Rogue a men's magazine which featured nude and semi-nude photographs of women, articles, and fiction. It was a direct competitor to Playboy. It made Hamling rich, and he began investing money in Palmer's magazines to help keep them afloat.

About 1959, Robert Silverberg and Harlan Ellison advised Hamling to start publishing pornographic paperback books. Hamling incorporated this new company, Freedom Publishing, in Wisconsin in October 1962. (Note: It was actually a reincorporation. Hamling had taken over a company called Blake Pharmaceuticals, then reincorporated it under a new name.)

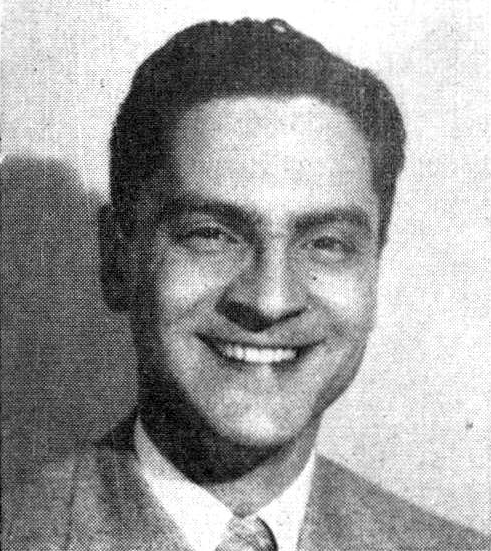
William Hamling in 1954. He was Palmer's good friend, and a significant investor in Palmer Publications. He also operated a pornographic book publishing company, which entangled Ray Palmer and Richard Shaver in a 1963 scandal.

Hamling kept his pornographic activities at arm's length from his mainstream writing and editing activities. To do so, he asked Richard Shaver; Shaver's wife, Dottie; and Raymond Palmer to incorporate Freedom Publishing in his stead. In exchange for their names appearing as officers, Hamling agreed to pay them a monthly stipend. They would not have to do any work for the dummy corporation to earn the stipend. It is unclear if Shaver approached Palmer with this scheme, or if Palmer approached Shaver, but Freedom House was duly incorporated by the three. Later, Palmer would claim that he didn't even know what Shaver was doing, he just signed the documents without reading them. Richard Shaver was the president and sole stockholder. Dottie Shaver was vice president, treasurer and secretary. Raymond Palmer was the lone director. Freedom Publishing expanded quickly, establishing the imprints Adult Books, Candida Readers, Companion Books, Corinth Publications, Ember Library, Greenleaf Classics, Greenleaf Publishing, Idle Hour Books, Late House Library, Leisure Books, Nightstand Books, Pleasure Readers, Red Enterprises, Regency Publications, and Midnight Reader, as well as buying the existing pornographic book publisher Bedside Books.

The Saturday Evening Post for the first week of April arrived in mailboxes in mid March 1963. Inside was a major article by Cleveland Amory attacking the pornographic book industry. Amory called Freedom Publishing "the worst of the worst". A deeply alarmed Richard Shaver drove to the Wisconsin state capital on March 16 and dissolved the corporation.

On April 4, the Milwaukee Journal and the Milwaukee Sentinel newspapers ran articles that identified Ray Palmer as a director of Freedom Publishing. The Milwaukee and the Portage County district attorneys began investigating Freedom Publishing, and visited Palmer's home, offices, and print shop. (Note: The state's investigation began in March, when New York law enforcement received a complaint about a Freedom Publishing book. The book's flyleaf said it was printed in Amherst, Wisconsin, so the complaint was referred to Wisconsin law enforcement.)

Palmer and Shaver said they were mere figureheads in the company. Palmer denied knowing what kind of books Freedom published, and any involvement in printing pornography. He claimed that Shaver had approached him with incorporation papers, and he agreed to have his name added as a director without investigating what was being incorporated. He admitted that he received $200 a month for the use of his name.

The Milwaukee Journal ran a follow-up piece on April 19, disclosing that Palmer had resigned as a director of Freedom Publishing.

According to Shaver's biographer Richard Toronto, Hamling, Palmer, and Shaver met shortly after the scandal broke and agreed that Shaver would shoulder the blame for everything. The rationale was that Hamling and Palmer were not only wealthy but respectable citizens in their communities, while Shaver was poor and eccentric. Their belief was that the press was less likely to blame Shaver. Although Shaver agreed to the plan, it soured the friendship between Shaver and Palmer.

Hamling's name was never mentioned in the press.

A few months after the controversy began, Richard Shaver moved to Summit, Arkansas. Shaver claimed he did so to help out a friend, and biographer Richard Toronto believes that he did so to help Palmer out. The move may also have been suggested by Palmer's lawyer. In March 1966 in Forum, Palmer "revealed" that Shaver had been declared dead but was, in fact, still alive. (Note: Shaver had never been declared dead by anyone.) He had "vanished" to flee prosecution on obscenity charges, but had now been cleared. (The truth was that Palmer knew full well where Shaver was living, and no charges had ever been brought against anyone in the Freedom Publishing case.)

In July 1966, the U.S. Department of Justice began an obscenity prosecution against Hamling. Although Richard Shaver had to travel to Houston, Texas, (where the two-month trial was held), Palmer's name never appeared in any charging documents and he was never called as a witness. Shaver never did have to testify, and Hamling was acquitted.

== Autobiography ==
About 1968, Raymond Palmer announced that he was going to write an autobiography. He was inspired to title it Martian Diary for two reasons. First, when people were uneasy about Palmer's physical appearance, he often defused the situation by saying, "As you can see, I really am from Mars." Second, a reader had written a letter to Palmer describing how she had hypnotized her daughter, who promptly gave an accurate physical description of Palmer and said he was a Martian.

Palmer originally intended for Martian Diary to be about a Martian living on Earth, but soon changed it to a memoir. He felt that it would take hundreds of thousands of words to tell his life story. He proposed that it be published in a hardbound oversize format that would sell for $10 a volume. Readers replied that they were unlikely to purchase such a pricey, unwieldy item, and suggested three paperbacks priced at $3.50 each.

His intent was to publish the book in 1970. For more than two years in Forum, Palmer discussed his writer's block, frustrations, and goals in writing the memoir, and repeatedly agonized over the definition of "truth". Most of Martian Diary originally appeared in these Forum columns. (Note: At one point, Palmer explained that reading about the Shaver Mystery had driven one young reader to suicide. Writing about his life story, which included the Shaver controversy, was "dangerous" to him, Palmer advised his readers.)

Palmer was embittered when few readers made an advance purchase, and he tabled the book for a time.

In September 1971, Palmer told readers of Forum that he had nearly completed the book. Just four months later, he admitted he had yet to begin it. Biographer Richard Toronto believes that Palmer had spent so much of his life making up stories about his past that he now found it difficult to be truthful. The frustrations and anguish he talked about in Forum were a way of angry subscribers at bay.

Palmer later confessed that in his first year at work on the autobiography, he wrote just 800 words. In March 1973, he wrote in Forum that "something" in the world didn't want him to write the memoir, and he blamed the Anti-Defamation League, Central Intelligence Agency, FBI, Internal Revenue Service, United States Air Force, and Second Amendment "gun nuts".

Behind the scenes, Palmer had largely given up writing a memoir. In July 1972, he wrote a letter to Richard Shaver telling him that he wanted to publish a book about Shaver's "rock books". He even sent Shaver a $100 advance. Shaver quickly put his thoughts down on paper, along with several images. He titled his work The Ancient Earth—Its Story in Stone.

In spring 1975, Raymond Palmer published The Secret World. Two books in one, the first half contained his 36-page autobiography Martian Diary, while the second contained Shaver's The Ancient Earth, Its Story in Stone. The writing of the autobiography, Palmer claimed, was guided by a "Deliberate Manipulator". Martian Diary endorsed Oahspe and Shaverism, detailed Palmer's belief that he had enhanced memory and could engage in astral projection and psychic travel, and discussed Palmer's interests in conspiracy theories surrounding the Bilderberg Group, CIA, "deep state" government, one-world secret societies, and the Warren Commission.

The Secret World was published in an oversize 9 by 11 inches (230 by 280 mm) format. It was hardbound with a baby blue cover, and retailed for $8.50. Only Palmer's name appeared on the cover, along with the words "Volume One". (There were no more volumes forthcoming.) The front and back covers featured "rock book" paintings by Shaver. The flyleafs depicted full color Rokfogo images.

No announcement or advertisements for the book appeared in any of Palmer's magazines. The first mention Ray made of the book came in an editorial in Forum in June 1975.

Richard Shaver was furious that his name did not appear on the book's cover, and that Palmer had combined his autobiography with Shaver's work. Adding insult, Palmer never gave Shaver a complimentary copy.

== Promotion of conspiracy theories ==
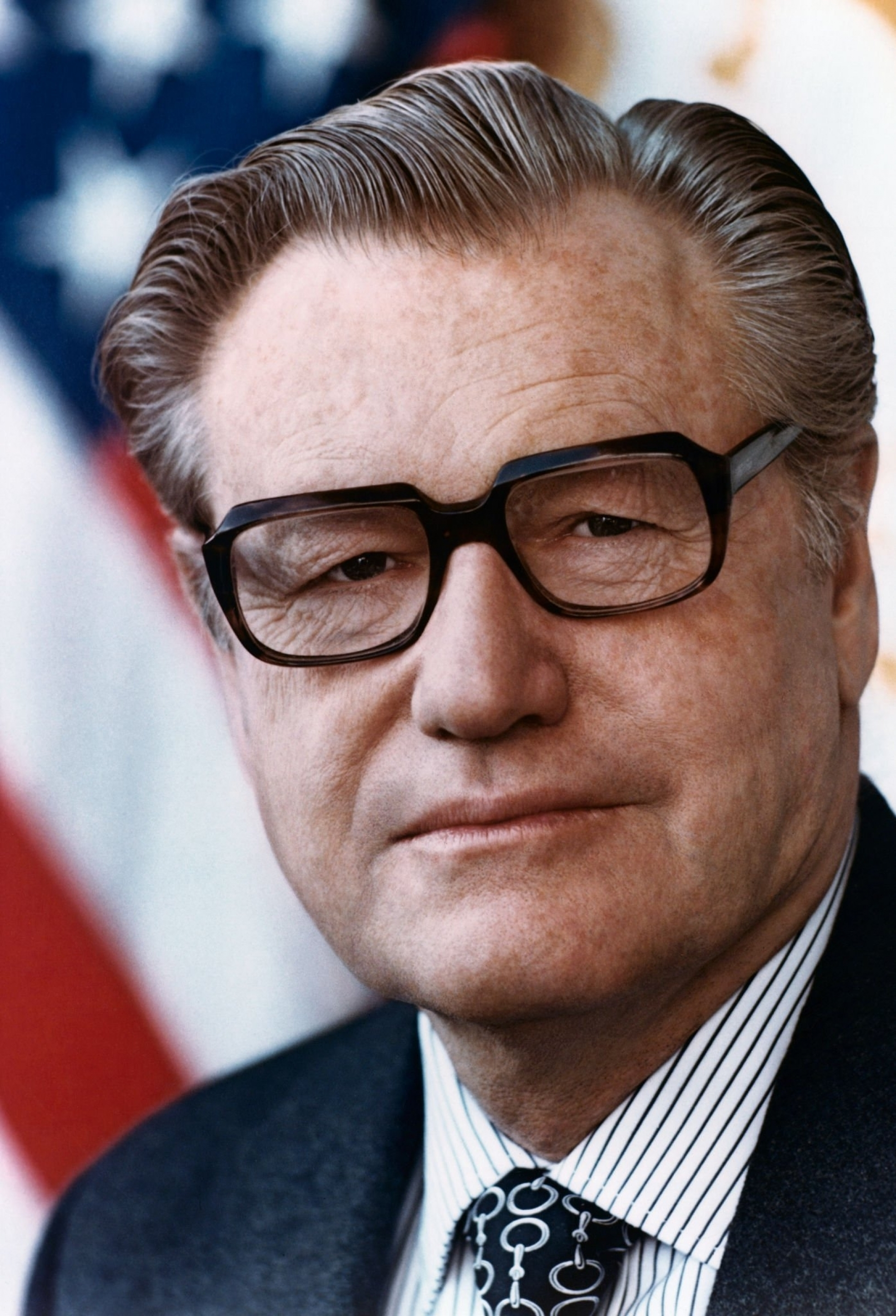
Among the many conspiracy theories Palmer promoted was one in which Nelson Rockefeller (depicted) was supposed to become President of the United States, create a dictatorship, and impose a new "mock" constitution.

Beginning in the early 1960s, Palmer became, as Fred Nadis called him, a "bitter, right-wing crank" who promoted various right-wing conspiracy theories. He was convinced that only Barry Goldwater, George Wallace, and Richard Nixon could save the world from various cabals intent on destroying individual freedoms. He wrote increasingly panicky editorials in his magazines which claimed that liberty was about to be lost.

He wrote about "world socialization under one world government under the control of the 'secret hidden government'" in an editorial in Search (September 1973). The United Nations was behind this "secret government", and the UN was, in turn, controlled by a Zionist World Government. (Palmer asserted he was not antisemitic.) In the early 1960s, this took the form of a "world credit card" with an identifying mark to be emblazoned on a person's hand. He voted for Goldwater in the belief Goldwater would stop it. He voted for George Wallace in the Republican primary in 1968, believing only Wallace could stop the coming crisis. (Palmer insisted Wallace was not a racist.) In 1974, he predicted that Nelson Rockefeller would depose Gerald Ford as president and create a "mock" constitution while ruling dictatorially. In October 1975, he claimed that conspirators were going to use the 1940 Potomac River Basin Compact to engage in an "Internal Capture of the United States". He predicted that the coming one world government would execute or institutionalize him for these beliefs.

Black power, flying saucers, pollution, riots, secularization, student activism, the Vietnam War, and worsening murder rates were all signs of the coming crisis, he claimed. The crisis was being worsened by what he saw as worsening dependence on government, created by the civil rights movement, equal pay for equal work, the Great Society, "new" civil rights, and Social Security.

Palmer particularly opposed environmental regulation. He claimed that a "conference of nations" had occurred 25 years earlier in South America to establish a conspiracy to deprive landowners of their rights. The Wisconsin Department of Natural Resources was even part of it.

Ray also tended to promote conspiracy theories about current events. He maintained that the Central Intelligence Agency was behind the killings of John F. Kennedy, Martin Luther King Jr., and Robert F. Kennedy. He blamed the Watergate scandal on G. Gordon Liddy. Nixon, Palmer declared, had "sacrificed himself to protect our country from world disgrace".

He was not entirely in lockstep with the American conservative movement, however. He opposed the Vietnam War, and even claimed the secret bombing of Cambodia was to cover up the fact that there was a UFO base there. Although he criticized student unrest, he was generally supportive of hippie culture and the sexual revolution. He remained critical of hallucinogens, however, because he believed they kept people from self-actualization and could cause despair. He believed overpopulation was at the root of student activism, and in October 1972 proposed the colonization of space as a solution to "youth discontent".

According to biographer Fred Nadis, Palmer's standard rhetorical technique when proven incorrect was to admit that he was wrong, then claim that he was right anyway or that he made the claim only to "elicit truth".

== Personal life and death ==
=== Beliefs ===
Raymond Palmer believed that some sort of mysterious force or "destiny" was at work in his life. He believed in pre-birth memory, astrology, and magical thinking. By the mid-1940s, he was convinced that science was a cult which asked people to believe rather than seek truth. He also believed the public had been brainwashed by education and religion.

He was registered to vote as a Republican his entire life, although one biographer says his politics were more Libertarian than conservative.

Palmer was, for most of his adult life, outgoing and social. According to his assistant and co-editor Bea Mahaffey, he was also very sensitive and easily hurt. He also enjoyed cooking, classical music, and opera. While living in Amherst, he often invited 80 or more neighbors to his weekly summer picnics. His New Year's Eve parties were widely attended and talked about.

=== Family life ===
Palmer began courting chorus girls at Milwaukee's Riverside Theater in 1935. He often spent large amounts of money while courting various women. He tried to produce a comedy revue there in order to meet more girls, but the show never got off the ground. From October 1935 to March 1936 he dated Peggy, a blonde chorus girl who worked at the theater.

In 1940, Palmer began dating Florence McMillan, a 19-year-old actress. They married on August 3, 1940, but the marriage was annulled a few weeks later.

Palmer met his future wife, Marjorie Wilson, at an October 1942 dinner party hosted by his friend, the writer Leroy Yerxa. They married on December 25, 1942. According to biographer Richard Toronto, Palmer's inferiority complex vanished after he married. The couple had three children: Raymond B., Jennifer, and Linda.

While living in Amherst, Raymond reconciled with his father, Roy. Roy became a frequent visitor to their home.

=== Death ===
In late July 1977, Palmer and his wife drove to Tallahassee, Florida, to visit their daughter, Jennifer, who had given birth. During the drive, Ray suffered from repeated bouts of numbness. He collapsed at his daughter's home on July 31, and was hospitalized the next day. Physicians determined that he had a blocked artery in his neck, and operated to remove it. He suffered complications from the surgery, and had two strokes that left him unable to talk.

Raymond Palmer died in Tallahassee on August 15, 1977. He was interred at Greenwood Cemetery near Amherst, Wisconsin.

== Legacy and tributes ==
The final issues of Forum, Flying Saucers, and Search were bundled together in a tribute issue to Ray Palmer. Fate ran a full-page obituary.

As editor of Amazing Stories, Palmer's emphasis on more juvenile adventure-romance stories created a deep rift in the science fiction fandom community. The Futurians, a group of left-leaning science fiction fans based in New York City, strongly opposed his editorial approach. At the 1940 World Science Fiction Convention (Chicon) in Chicago, the Futurians published an anti-Palmer pamphlet that was given away to attendees as they entered the meeting hall. The conflict with Palmer remains part of the historic institutional and collective memory of East Coast fandom into the 21st century.

Palmer's legacy as a writer and editor are mixed. Fred Nadis says that most writers of science fiction scorn Palmer for his hucksterism and fringe views. Nadis notes that Palmer did invent an entirely new genre of fiction, the paranormal pulp. Science fiction historian E. F. Bleiler went further. He said Palmer's writing could be ignored, and his promotion of irrationality made him unimportant as an editor. Mike Ashley, however, called Palmer daring and innovative while he helmed Other Worlds. Author Frank M. Robinson also praised his editing of Universe.

Histories of the flying saucer and New Age movements tend to ignore Raymond Palmer. UFOlogists Peter Kor and John Keel, however, argue that Palmer was almost completely responsible for igniting the flying saucer movement. Religious scholar Jeffrey J. Kripal gives Palmer a central role in the bringing the paranormal into mainstream pop culture, and Fred Nadis points to Palmer's promotion of and influence on the Shaver Mystery at major influences on television shows like The X-Files and Twin Peaks.

The secret identity of DC Comics superhero the Atom—introduced by comic book writer Gardner Fox in 1961—is named after Palmer. Julius Schwartz telephoned his old friend Palmer for his permission to give the new Atom the name "Ray Palmer". Palmer consented. Schwartz was inspired by the call to give Atom the power to travel via telephone lines.

"I Remember Lemuria" was nominated for a Retro Hugo Award in 1996.

In September 2013, Palmer was posthumously named to the First Fandom Hall of Fame in a ceremony at the 71st World Science Fiction Convention.

== Bibliography ==
=== Short stories ===
- The Time Ray of Jandra, Wonder Stories (June 1930)
- The Man Who Invaded Time, Science Fiction Digest (October 1932)
- Escape from Antarctica, Science Fiction Digest (Juneau 1933)
- The Girl from Venus, Science Fiction Digest (September 1933)
- The Return to Venus, Fantasy Magazine (May 1934)
- The Vortex World, Fantasy Magazine (1934)
- The Time Tragedy, Wonder Stories (December 1934)
- Three from the Test-Tube, Wonder Stories (1935)
- The Symphony of Death, Amazing Stories (December 1935)
- Matter Is Conserved, Astounding Science-Fiction (April 1938)
- Catalyst Planet, Thrilling Wonder Stories (August 1938)
- The Blinding Ray, Amazing Stories (August 1938)
- Outlaw of Space, Amazing Stories (August 1938)
- Black World (Part 1 of 2), Amazing Stories (March 1940)
- Black World (Part 2 of 2), Amazing Stories (April 1940)
- The Vengeance of Martin Brand (Part 1 of 2), Amazing Stories (August 1942)
- The Vengeance of Martin Brand (Part 2 of 2), Amazing Stories (September 1942)
- King of the Dinosaurs, Fantastic Adventures (October 1945)
- Toka and the Man Bats, Fantastic Adventures (February 1946)
- Toka Fights the Big Cats, Fantastic Adventures (December 1947)
- In the Sphere of Time, Planet Stories (Summer 1948)
- The Justice of Martin Brand, Other Worlds Science Stories (July 1950)
- The Hell Ship, Worlds of If (March 1952)
- Mr. Yellow Jacket, Other Worlds (June 1951)
- I Flew in a Flying Saucer (Part 1 of 2), Other Worlds Science Stories (October 1951)
- I Flew in a Flying Saucer (Part 2 of 2), Other Worlds Science Stories (December 1951)
- The Metal Emperor, Imaginative Tales (November 1955)

=== Nonfiction ===
- The Coming of the Saucers (with Kenneth Arnold) (1952)
- The Secret World (with Richard Shaver) (1975)

== Bibliography ==
- Adelson, Betty M. (2005). The Lives of Dwarfs: Their Journey From Public Curiosity Toward Social Liberation. Brunswick, NJ: Rutgers University Press. ISBN 9780813535487.
- Albee, Fred H. (September 9, 1911). "Transplantation of a Portion of the Tibia Into the Spine for Pott's Disease: A Preliminary Report". Journal of the American Medical Association. 57 (11): 885–886. doi:10.1001/jama.1911.04260090107012.
- Ashley, Michael (2000). The History of the Science-Fiction Magazine. Volume 1: The Time Machines: The Story of the Science-Fiction Pulp Magazines From the Beginning to 1950. Liverpool, UK: Liverpool University Press. ISBN 9780853238553.
- Ashley, Michael (2000). The History of the Science-Fiction Magazine. Volume 2: Transformations: The Story of the Science-Fiction Magazines From 1950 to 1970. Liverpool, UK: Liverpool University Press. ISBN 9780853237693.
- Barkun, Michael (2013). A Culture of Conspiracy: Apocalyptic Visions in Contemporary America. Berkeley: University of California Press. ISBN 9780520276826.
- Boyle, Tanner F. (2021). The Fortean Influence on Science Fiction: Charles Fort and the Evolution of the Genre. Jefferson, NC: McFarland & Co. ISBN 9781476641904.
- Cronin, Brian (2009). Was Superman a Spy?: And Other Comic Book Legends Revealed. New York: Plume. ISBN 9780452295322.
- del Rey, Lester (2021). The World of Science Fiction, 1926–1976: The History of a Subculture. Abingdon, Oxfordshire: Routledge. ISBN 9780367748395.
- Gardner, Martin (1991). The New Age: Notes of a Fringe Watcher. Amherst, NY: Prometheus Books. ISBN 9780879756444.
- Greer, John Michael (2007). Atlantis: Ancient Legacy, Hidden Prophecy. Woodbury, MN: Llewellyn Publications. ISBN 9780738709789.
- Grossman, Wendy M.; French, Christopher C. (2014). Why Statues Weep: The Best of the 'Skeptic'. New York: Routledge. ISBN 9781134962525.
- Hamilton, Cynthia S. (1987). Western and Hard-Boiled Detective Fiction in America: From High Noon to Midnight. Iowa City: University of Iowa Press. ISBN 9780877451792.
- Judson, Karen (1998). Isaac Asimov: Master of Science Fiction. Springfield, NJ: Enslow Publishers. ISBN 9780766010314.
- McKee, Gabriel (2015). "Shaver Mystery". In Laycock, Joseph (ed.). Spirit Possession Around the World: Possession, Communion, and Demon Expulsion Across Cultures. Santa Barbara, CA: ABC-CLIO. ISBN 9781610695893.
- McKee, Gabriel (2020). "'Reality – Is it a Horror?': Richard Shaver's Subterranean World and the Displaced Self" (PDF). The Journal of Gods and Monsters. 1 (1): 1–17. doi:10.58997/jgm.v1i1.1.
- Moskowitz, Sam (1994). "The Origins of Science Fiction Fandom: A Reconstruction". In Sanders, Joseph L. (ed.). Science Fiction Fandom: Contributions to the Study of Science Fiction and Fantasy. Westport, CN: Greenwood Press. ISBN 9780313233807.
- Mostofi, Seyed Behrooz (2005). Who's Who in Orthopedics. London: Springer. ISBN 9781852337865.
- Nadis, Fred (2013). The Man From Mars: Ray Palmer's Amazing Pulp Journey. New York: Penguin Group. ISBN 9780399160547.
- Oak, Holly (2021). "Raymond W. Bernard, Hollow Earth, and UFOs". In Zeller, Benjamin E. (ed.). Handbook of UFO Religions. Leiden, Netherlands: Brill. ISBN 9789004434370.
- Pilkington, Mark (2010). Mirage Men: A Journey into Disinformation, Paranoia and UFOs. London: Constable. ISBN 9781845298579.
- Ramaswamy, Sumathi (2004). The Lost Land of Lemuria: Fabulous Geographies, Catastrophic Histories. Berkeley: University of California Press. ISBN 9780520240322.
- Roberts, James P. (2002). Famous Wisconsin Authors. Oregon, Wisc.: Badger Books. ISBN 9781878569851.
- Sabella, Robert (2000). Who Shaped Science Fiction?. Commack, NY: Kroshka Books. ISBN 9781560725206.
- Schelly, Bill (2016). Otto Binder: The Life and Work of a Comic Book and Science Fiction Visionary. Berkeley, CA: North Atlantic Books. ISBN 9781623170370.
- Schweitzer, Darrell (1994). "Robert Bloch". In Schweitzer, Darrell; Mallett, Daryl F. (eds.). Speaking of Horror: Interviews With Writers of the Supernatural. San Bernardino, CA: Borgo Press. ISBN 9780893701772.
- Stableford, Brian M. (1995). Outside the Human Aquarium: Masters of Science Fiction. San Bernardino, CA: Borgo Press. ISBN 9780893703578.
- Standish, David (2007). Hollow Earth: The Long and Curious History of Imagining Strange Lands, Fantastical Creatures, Advanced Civilizations, and Marvelous Machines Below the Earth's Surface. Cambridge, MA: Da Capo Books. ISBN 9780306813733.
- Toronto, Richard (2013). War Over Lemuria: Richard Shaver, Ray Palmer and the Strangest Chapter of 1940s Science Fiction. Jefferson, NC: McFarland & Co. ISBN 9780786473076.
- Warner, Harry Jr. (1969). All Our Yesterdays: An Informal History of Science Fiction Fandom in the Forties. Chicago: Advent Publishers. ISBN 9780911682007.
- Yaszek, Lisa; Sharp, Patrick B. (2016). Sisters of Tomorrow: The First Women of Science Fiction. Middletown, CN: Wesleyan University Press. ISBN 9780819576231.
