= Fate (magazine) =

Magazine of the paranormal

- The first issue of fate, from Spring 1948
- Editor: Phyllis Galde
- Founder: Raymond A. Palmer and Curtis Fuller
- First issue: 1948; 78 years ago
- Company: Galde Press
- Country: United States
- Language: English
- Website: www.fatemag.com
- ISSN: 0014-8776
- OCLC: 1780183

Fate is an American magazine about paranormal phenomena. Fate was co-founded in 1948 by Raymond A. Palmer (editor of Amazing Stories) and Curtis Fuller. It was operated by the Fuller family from 1953 to 1988, when it was bought by the New Age publisher Llewellyn Publications. Llewellyn operated Fate until 2001, when it was sold to Galde Press, owned by the editor-in-chief, Phyllis Galde. The magazine's current owner and editor is Matthew Kibbey. Fate covers a wide range of paranormal topics.

== History ==
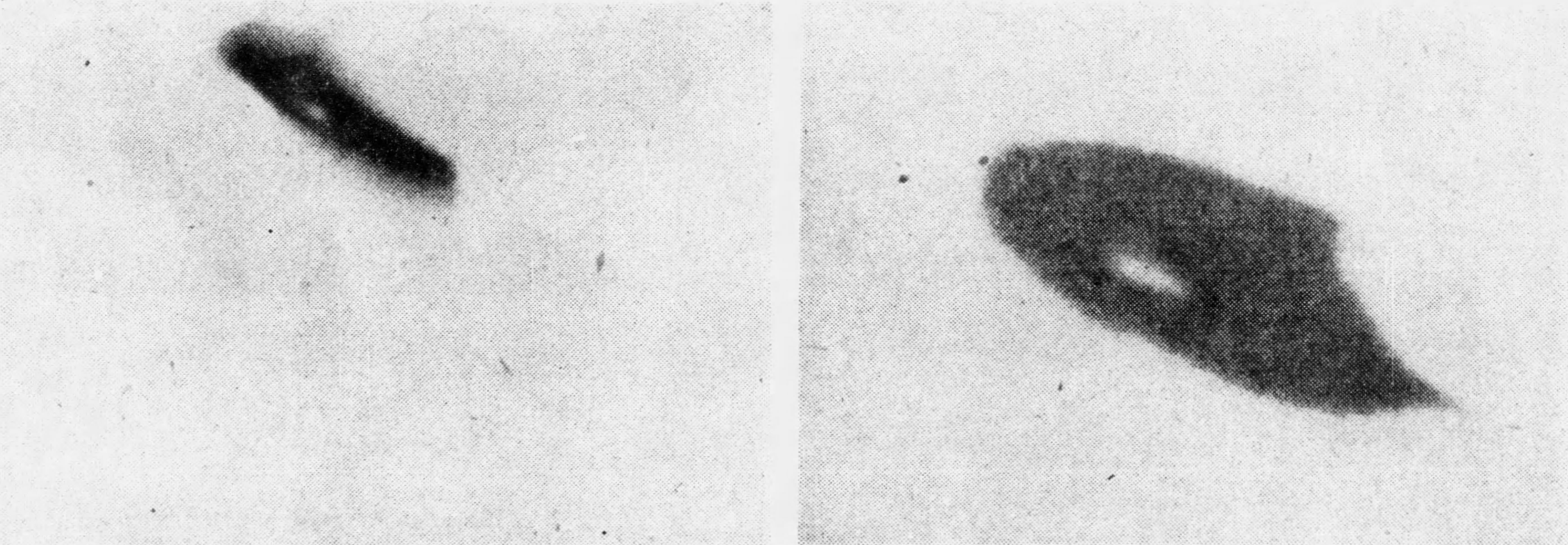
The Rhodes flying disc photos of Phoenix were reprinted in the inaugural issue of Fate.

Established in 1948 by Clark Publishing Company, the first edition of Fate hit world newsstands in the spring. Co-founded by Ray Palmer, editor of the Amazing Stories magazine, and Curtis Fuller, himself an editor, the magazine's inaugural edition featured an article by Kenneth Arnold who recounted in it his UFO encounter in 1947. Arnold's sighting marked the beginning of the modern UFO era, and his story propelled the magazine to national recognition.

In 1953, Curtis Fuller and his wife Mary took full control of Fate when Palmer sold his interest in the venture. Under the direction of the Fullers, Fate expanded its scope and its readership reached over 100,000 subscribers. Mary took over editing the magazine in 1966. In 1988, Jerome Clark became editor.

In 1988, Fate was sold to the St. Paul, Minnesota-based New Age publisher Llewellyn Publications. In his farewell column, Curtis Fuller wrote, "Our purpose throughout this long time has been to explore and to report honestly the strangest facts of this strange world and the ones that don't fit into the general beliefs of the way things are." In 1994, Llewellyn decided to change it from digest size to a full-size, full-color magazine. Phyllis Galde was editor in chief under Llewellyn from 1989 to 1994; she returned to being editor in chief in 1999.

In September 2001, Galde Press, Inc., owned by Galde, purchased Fate; at the time Llewellyn had been experiencing layoffs. With Galde Press, its headquarters are in Lakeville, Minnesota. In May 2003, Fate returned to its pre-1994 digest size. In 2008, it moved to a bi-monthly format with its July/August issue. In June 2026, the magazine was purchased from Galde by Matthew Kibbey, who moved the magazine's operations to Leelanau County, Michigan.

== Topics and contents ==
Fate covers a wide range of paranormal topics. It was also at times known for its extensive advertising section, which included a wide range of materials relevant to the paranormal scene.

== Reception ==
J. Gordon Melton described it in 2001 as the "preeminent American journal" on the subject, writing that it both "promoted, through its very existence, all areas of inquiry on matters psychic, occult, and Fortean", but also "took the lead in exposing hoaxes and printing articles presenting evidence of mundane explanations of supposed mysterious phenomena." Andrew J. Rotter, writing for The Journal of American History, described it as "a kind of occult Reader's Digest".

== Book collections ==
- "Strange Fate" Compiled by the Editors of Fate Magazine, with an Introduction by Frank Edwards. Paperback Library. 1965.
- "Strange Twist of Fate" Compiled by the Editors of Fate Magazine. Paperback Library. 1967.
- "Exploring the Healing Miracle" Compiled by the Editors of Fate Magazine. Clark. 1983.
- "Out of Time and Place" Compiled & Edited by Terry O'Neill from the files of Fate Magazine. Llewellyn Publications. 1999. ISBN 1-56718-261-5
- "Mysteries and Monsters of the Sea" Compiled by the Editors of Fate Magazine. Gramercy. 2001. ISBN 0-517-16349-7
- "Mysteries of the deep" Compiled & Edited by Frank Spaeth from the files of Fate Magazine. Bounty Books, 2005. ISBN 0-7537-1116-8
- "Strange But True—From the Files of Fate Magazine" By: Corrine Kenner, Craig Miller. September 2002. ISBN 978-1-56718-298-9
- "True Tales of Ghostly Encounters" By: Andrew Honigman. September 2006. ISBN 978-0-7387-0989-5
