= Linfield =

Linfield may refer to:

- Linfield F.C., a professional football club in Northern Ireland
- Linfield University, in Oregon, United States
  - Linfield Review, a newspaper published by students at Linfield University
- Linfield, Pennsylvania, a village in Pennsylvania, United States

== People with the surname ==
- Frances Linfield (1852–1940), American educator, social activist and philanthropist
- Frederick Linfield (1861–1939), British politician
- George Fisher Linfield (1846–1890), American clergyman and educator
- Mark Linfield, producer of nature documentaries on British TV

== See also ==
- Lindfield (disambiguation)
- Lingfield (disambiguation)
