= KLYC =

- McMinnville, Oregon; United States
- Broadcast area: Yamhill County, Oregon
- Frequency: 1260 kHz
- Branding: The Voice of Yamhill County

Programming
- Format: Classic hits

Ownership
- Owner: Richard Mason; (Richard Mason)
- Operator: Richard Mason

History
- First air date: June 18, 1949 (as KMCM)
- Former call signs: KMCM (1949–1979); KCYX (1979–1990)
- Call sign meaning: K Loving Yamhill County

Technical information
- Licensing authority: FCC
- Facility ID: 6322
- Class: B
- Power: 1,000 watts (day); 850 watts (night)
- Transmitter coordinates: 45°14′04″N 123°07′57″W

Links
- Public license information: Public file; LMS
- Webcast: Listen live
- Website: klycradio.com

KLYC (1260 AM) is a radio station licensed to serve McMinnville, Oregon and surrounding areas such as the state capitol, Salem, United States. The station's broadcast license is held by Richard Mason.

KLYC Radio sports the theme of "the voice of Yamhill County."

KLYC began broadcasting on June 18,1949. The format is "Classic Hits," with songs from the 70s, 80s, and 90s. KLYC also features local sports, including high school football games, plus Linfield College Wildcats college football games.

== History ==
=== Launch as KMCM ===
Work on this station began when the Federal Communications Commission issued a construction permit for a new AM station to McMinnville Broadcasting Company on September 9, 1948. The new station was authorized to broadcast with 1,000 watts of power, daytime-only, on a frequency of 1260 kHz as KMCM. McMinnville Broadcasting owner Jack B. Bladine was also the publisher of the Telephone-Register newspaper in McMinnville. The corporate name on the permit was changed to Yamhill Broadcasters in December 1948.

Physical construction of the broadcast tower began in January 1949 with work on the radio studio building commencing in March 1949. KMCM began testing its transmitter on June 11, 1949, and started regular broadcast operation at 11:00am on June 18, 1949, with a ceremonial first broadcast at a local theater inaugurated by McMinnville mayor R.H. Windisher. The station's initial format was a mix of local and syndicated block programming under the slogan "Always good listening". KMCM was authorized to add nighttime service with a 1,000 watt directional signal on November 4, 1949.

The station joined the Keystone Broadcasting System on March 1, 1950, but dropped it in favor of Gordon McLendon's Liberty Broadcasting System on October 2, 1950. This radio network affiliation lasted until Liberty went out of business in May 1952, and KMCM resumed its previous Keystone affiliation.

=== Sale and changes ===
On August 22, 1959, Yamhill Broadcasters, Inc., announced that it had agreed to sell KMCM to the Yamhill Radio Company for a reported sale price of $80,000. The deal was approved by the FCC on October 1, 1959. The station's format was changed in mid-1962 to a middle of the road sound.

The new ownership was short-lived as KMCM was sold again on April 1, 1963, to Ray Andrew Fields for a reported $100,000. After a few more years of MOR operation, the station flipped to Top 40 music in January 1967. One year later, on January 1, 1968, KMCM became a charter affiliate of ABC Radio's "American Information Network" which featured newscasts at the top of every hour.

On October 29, 1968, Ray Andrew Fields committed to sell KMCM to Norjud Broadcasting, Inc., for a reported title price of $97,500. Norjud Broadcasting, owned by Norman and Judith Aldred, gained FCC approval for the sale on November 16, 1968. The new owners moved the music format back to the middle of the road.

However, change became the constant as in October 1971 the station added country & western to the music mix with the station becoming a purely C&W station by October 1972. The station's on-promotions claimed that the "MCM" in KMCM stood for "More Country Music". But by late 1976, KMCM returned some MOR music to its schedule and in early 1977 flipped to an entirely adult contemporary music format. In 1978, the station re-introduced Top 40 music to its mix, but only in the evenings.

=== Switch to KCYX, 1980s ===
The station was assigned the KCYX call sign by the Federal Communications Commission on June 6, 1979.

In March 1980, Norjud Broadcasting, Inc., reached an agreement to sell this station to Radio 1260, Inc., for a reported $475,000. The deal was approved by the FCC on May 21, 1980. The new owners dropped the Top 40 block and spread the adult contemporary format to all dayparts.

In July 1987, Radio 1260, Inc., reached an agreement to sell this station to Matrix Media, Inc., for a reported sale price of $681,812. The deal was approved by the FCC on July 31, 1987, and the transaction was consummated on September 15, 1987. Matrix Media shifted the format to a successful mix of adult contemporary music and talk radio. On-air talent included Program Director/Music Director Rich Patterson, morning man Steve Kenyon, News Director Ben Gutierez, Marty Lanser, KC McCormick, John Hugill, Glenn Nobel, Mark Lacy, Sports Director Tom Lockyear & Loren Engel.

=== KLYC in the 1990s ===
In April 1990, as part of the Chapter 11 bankruptcy proceedings involving Matrix Media, the broadcast license for KCYX was transferred to trustee Thomas A. Huntsberger. The involuntary transfer was approved by the FCC on May 14, 1990, and KCYX went off the air. Two weeks later, in late May 1990, trustee Huntsberger arranged a sale of KCYX and its assets to Larry and Stella Bohnsack, doing business as Bohnsack Strategies, Inc., for a reported $120,000. The deal was approved by the FCC on October 2, 1990, and the transaction was consummated on October 31, 1990. The new owners had the FCC change the station's call sign to KLYC on June 20, 1990. KLYC returned to the air in October 1990 with a format blending adult contemporary and oldies music.

The station increased its broadcast power to 1,000 watts on May 1, 1996. The station shifted to an all-oldies format, focused on the hits of the 1960s and 1970s, in 2001. Although now largely automated, this remains the station's current music format.

The station continues to carry high school sports as of 2025.

== Haunted studios ==
In 1991, KLYC's news director documented a "presence" of something paranormal in the station's equipment room, especially while the broadcast transmitter was being warmed up for the day's operation. A clairvoyant named Erin Lasell was brought in to investigate in October 1991 and she confirmed the "presence" at the station. The station's owners confirmed that this "presence" had been reported by a number of other employees over the years as well. KLYC occupied this building until moving to a new radio studio building in 1993. The station relocated its broadcast tower in 2000 and the former studio building is now a daycare facility. Staff at the daycare have also reported paranormal activity in the same part of the building.

== KLYC to go off the air ==
On March 18, 2013, it was announced that KLYC would cease broadcasting on March 22 at 1 pm (advertised as 12:60 pm in reference to the station's broadcast frequency. As of June 2013, the station has returned to the air.

As of February 17, 2014, the station was sold Celebrate Life Media, LLC, owned by David and Norma Adams; the purchase price was $50,000. The format is oldies, hit music of the 1950s, 1960s, 1970s. The station continues to provide local news and event coverage and music of the 50s, 60s, and 70s. KLYC Radio also provides podcasting and a companion company, the Oregon Pulse Network provides internet radio channels, podcasting, and streaming video

Effective December 3, 2019, the station's license was assigned to Wesley Simkins' ProMedia Partners LLC. Effective May 24, 2023, the station's license was assigned to Richard Mason in exchange for assuming KLYC's debt.

KLYC returns to McMinnville in 2024

After KLYC operated remotely out of Indiana for several years, Richard Mason re-established KLYC in McMinnville. Mason is originally from nearby Beaverton, where his ancestors practiced medicine for two generations over 80 years. During world War II, Mason's mother, Martha Randall Cathey Mason, worked at a group of radio stations in Portland including KWJJ. Mason is a 5th Generation Oregonian. His ancestors, William and Thursa Cathey, arrived by covered wagon over the Oregon Trail in 1853. The Cathey family homesteaded 320 acres in what is now Gresham. William and Thursa Cathey attended the Yamhill County Fair in 1854, which was held in Lafayette, just a few miles from present-day McMinnville. Mason's great-aunt, Alice Clement, taught music at Linfield College in McMinnville from 1922 to 1946. The "Alice Clement Memorial Pipe Organ" in Melrose Hall was purchased with a gift she left to Linfield.
