= Lingfield =

Lingfield can refer to:

- Lingfield, County Durham, England, a village
- Lingfield, Surrey, England, a village
  - Lingfield Park Racecourse
  - Lingfield Cricket Club, prominent in the 18th century
  - Lingfield railway station, serving the village and racecourse
  - Lingfield F.C., a football club in the village
  - Lingfield College, a school in the village
- Lingfield Christian Academy, an independent school in Gweru, Zimbabwe

== See also ==
- Lindfield (disambiguation)
- Linfield (disambiguation)
