= KSLC =

Classical radio station in McMinnville, Oregon

Coordinates: 45.158°N 123.291°W

Simulcasting KQAC Portland
- McMinnville, Oregon; United States
- Frequency: 90.3 MHz (HD Radio)
- Branding: All Classical Radio

Programming
- Format: Classical
- Subchannels: HD2: ICAN Children's Arts Network

Ownership
- Owner: All Classical Public Media, Inc.

History
- First air date: 1972

Technical information
- Licensing authority: FCC
- Facility ID: 37731
- Class: A
- ERP: 750 watts
- HAAT: 102 meters (335 ft)

Links
- Public license information: Public file; LMS
- Webcast: Listen Live
- Website: allclassical.org allclassical.org/ican/ (HD2)

KSLC (90.3 FM) is a classical music radio station in McMinnville, Oregon. It is broadcast over the air on 90.3 MHz and on the internet using the Live365 player.

KSLC broadcasts in HD.

At 7 a.m. on April 2, 2020, KSLC switched to a simulcast of classical-formatted KQAC 89.9 FM Portland and to ICAN-children's arts on its HD2 subchannel.

Effective November 19, 2020, Linfield University donated the station's license to All Classical Public Media, Inc.

== Campus radio station at Linfield University ==
While the station license was owned by Linfield, KSLC was an entirely student-run college radio station with reception throughout town and the immediate vicinity. The full-time student-staff consisted of ten members, who worked under the guidance of one faculty advisor. All work for KSLC was on a volunteer basis, but credit was also available through the electronic media practices and broadcast practices courses at Linfield. It played a wide variety of music and also broadcast Linfield Wildcats sporting events. The station was housed in Pioneer Hall until 2007, when a new facility was completed in the basement of Renshaw Hall.

== See also ==
- List of community radio stations in the United States
