= Pioneer Hall (Oregon) =

Building at Linfield College in McMinnville, Oregon, U.S.

- Pioneer Hall, Linfield College
- U.S. National Register of Historic Places
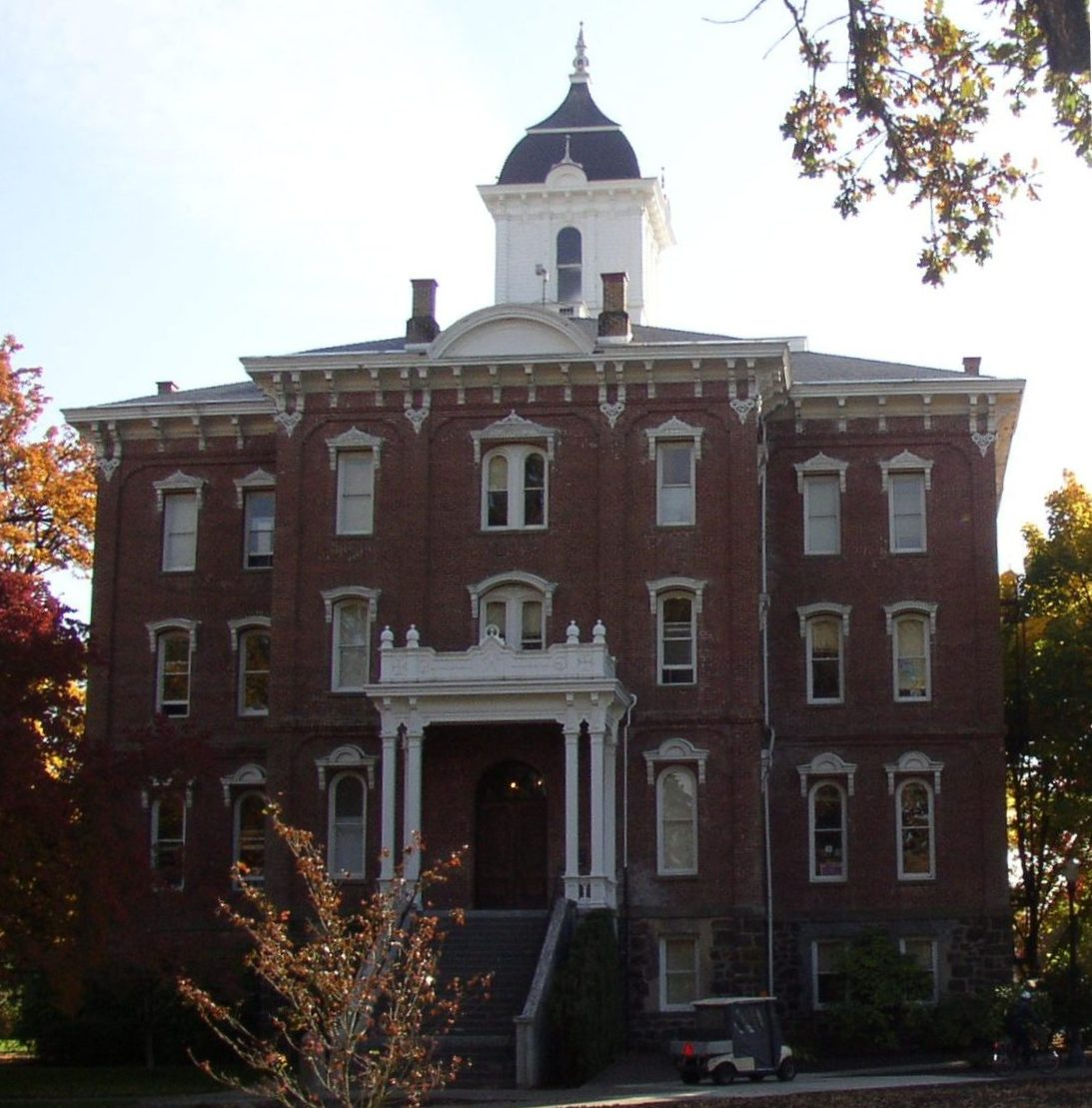
- Pioneer Hall at Linfield College

- Location within Oregon Location within the United States
- Location: Linfield College; McMinnville, Oregon
- Coordinates: 45°12′05″N 123°11′57″W
- Built: 1882-1883
- Architectural style: Italianate
- NRHP reference No.: 78002330
- Added to NRHP: February 23, 1978

Pioneer Hall is the oldest building at Linfield College in McMinnville, Oregon, United States. Opened in 1883, the four-story Italianate structure formerly housed the entire school. Constructed of red bricks and topped with a belfry, the structure was added to the National Register of Historic Places in 1978 as Pioneer Hall, Linfield College. Part of the hall serves as residences and part as classrooms.

== History ==
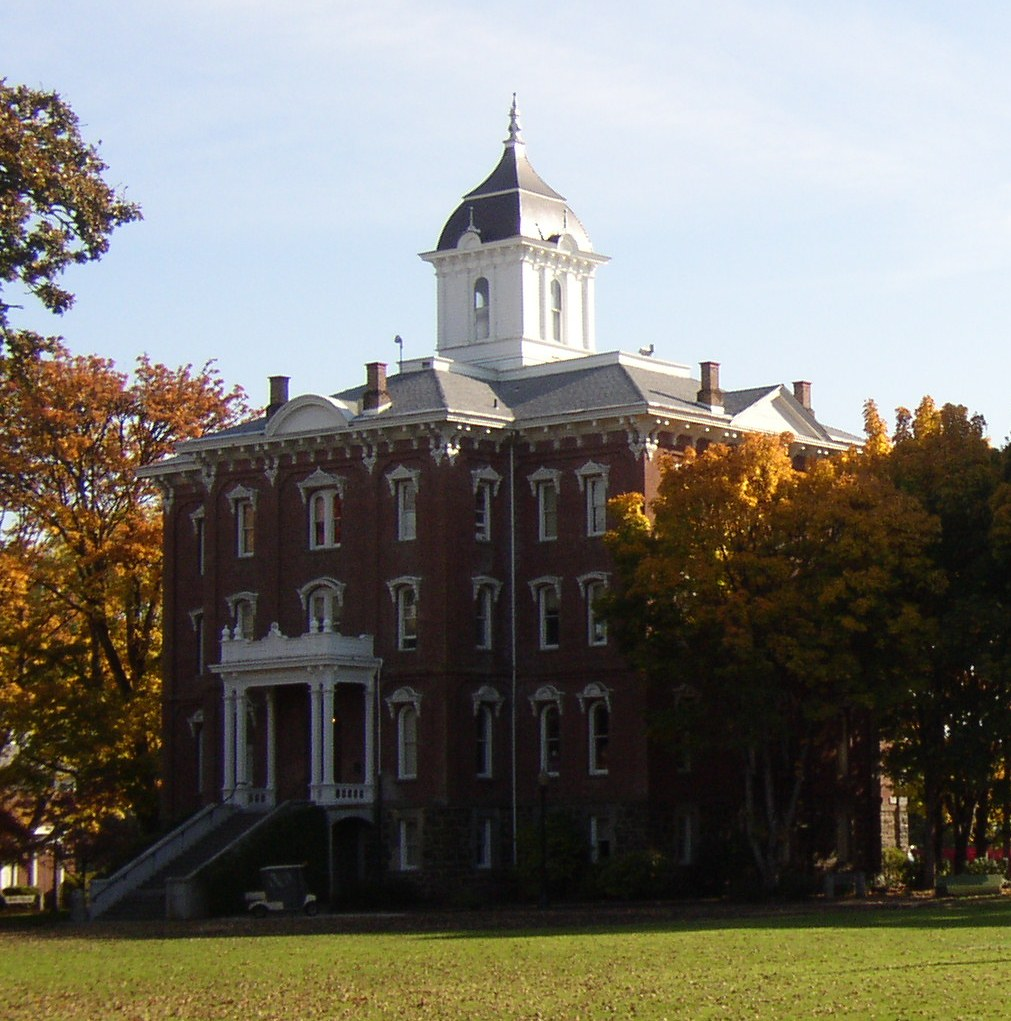
Pioneer Hall from the northwest

In 1879, what was then known as McMinnville University began plans to construct a new building to house the school. After a professor, W. S. White, drafted plans for the building that year, the school waited until 1882 to begin construction. That year the cornerstone was laid where the cabin of the Cozine family once stood until they donated 20 acres (81,000 m^{2}) to the school the prior year. The building was dedicated June 12, 1883, and at that time housed the entire college.

In November 1907, landscape architect John Charles Olmsted visited the campus to advise the school on the design of the campus. At the time Pioneer Hall was the only hall on campus and a wooden gymnasium was the only other building. Olmstead described Pioneer Hall as ugly, and the other building as cheap. In 1922, the school became Linfield College. In 1929, the building was renamed as Pioneer Hall in honor of the pioneers of the school.

Pioneer Hall was then remodeled in 1946. On February 23, 1978, the structure was added to the National Register of Historic Places. Pioneer Hall also used to house the Linfield College radio station, KSLC 90.3 FM, until 2007 when it moved into Renshaw Hall. The radio station - as KLIN AM - was also housed in the music and art building (old Frerichs Hall) which burned down in 1969, while the transmitter remained in Pioneer. On January 8, 2008, the nearby Old Oak tree estimated at 250 years old fell down. As of 2008, the building is used for a variety of uses. It was a 47-person residence hall on the upper floors, but as of 2018, the top two floors are no longer inhabited. Now the lower floors are home to the departments of Psychology, History, and Political Science.

== Architecture ==
Atop the hall is a square belfry, which is topped by a dome and spire. The architectural style of the brick structure is Italian Bracketed. Pioneer Hall is a mixture of the cruciform plan and Italianate style. W. S. White designed the four-story building which has three above-ground stories atop a stone basement.

== Gallery ==
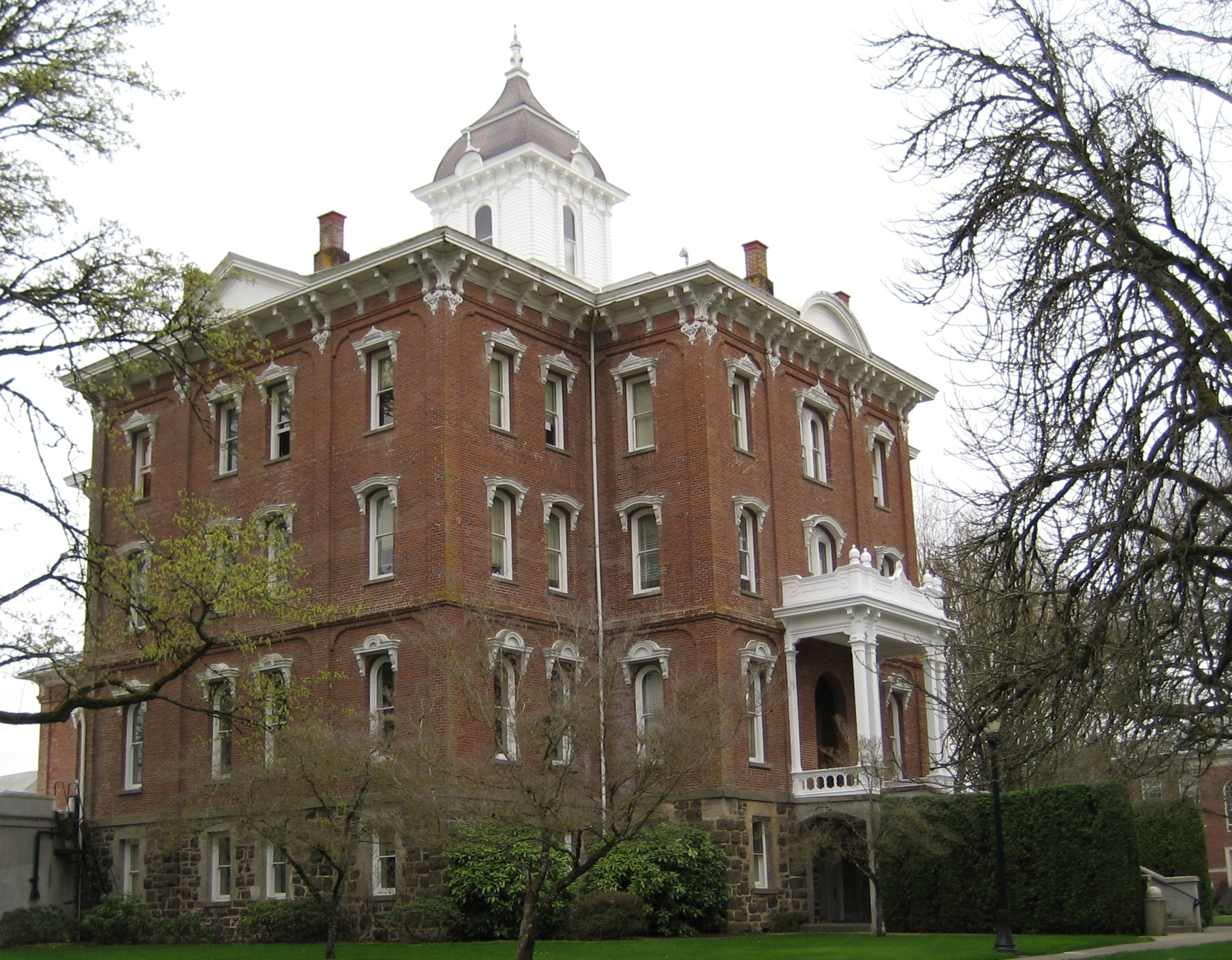

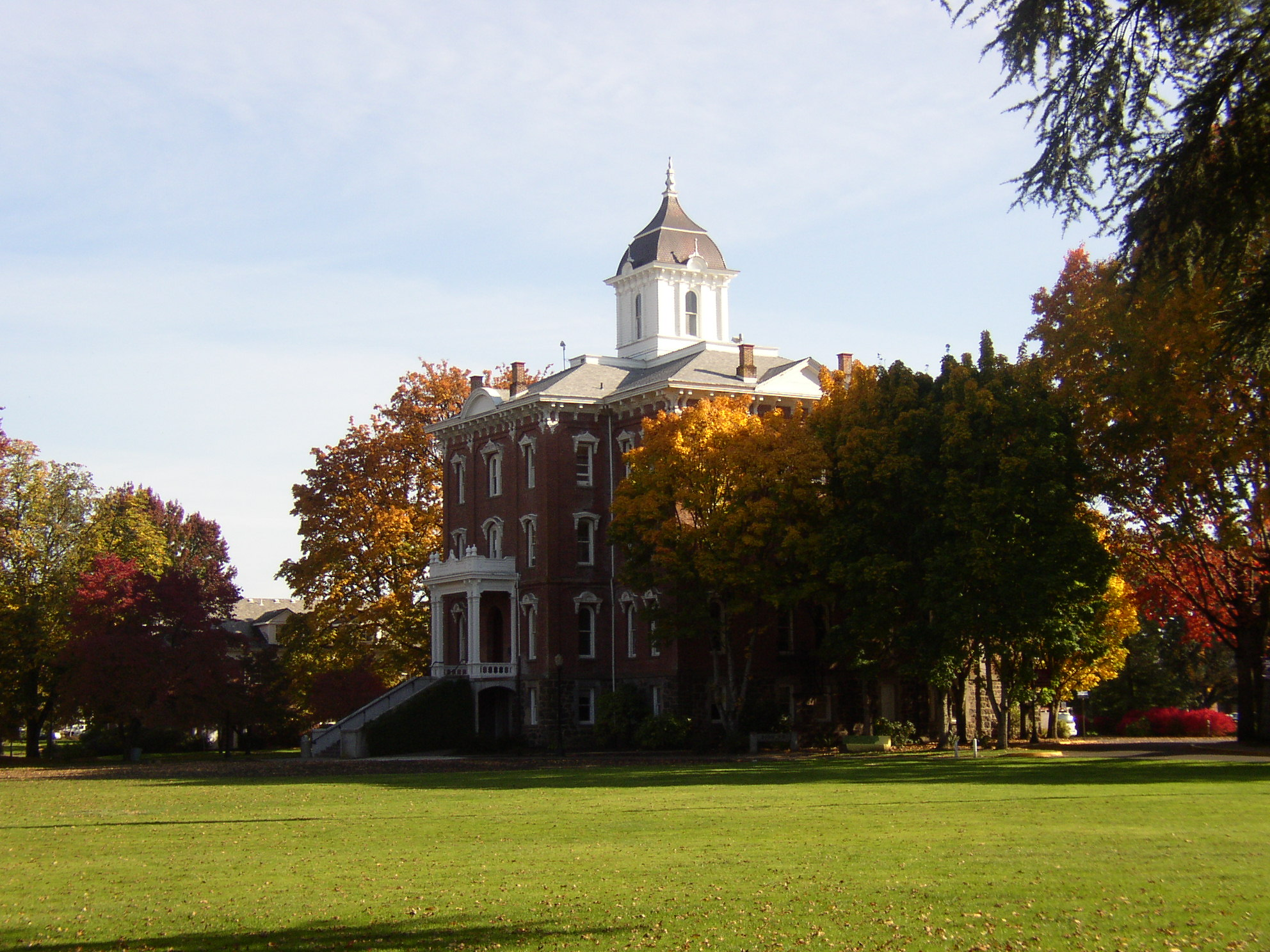
