= Lindfield =

Lindfield may refer to:

- Lindfield, New South Wales, Australia
- Lindfield, West Sussex, United Kingdom
- Lindfield Rugby Club in NSW, Australia
- Bob Lindfield (1901–1959), Australian rugby player
- Craig Lindfield (born 1988), English footballer

== See also ==
- Linfield (disambiguation)
- Lingfield (disambiguation)
