= George Fisher Linfield =

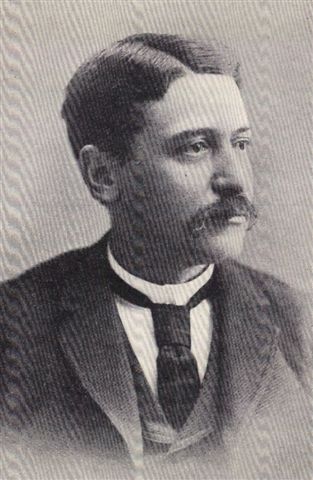
George Fisher Linfield (1846-1890)

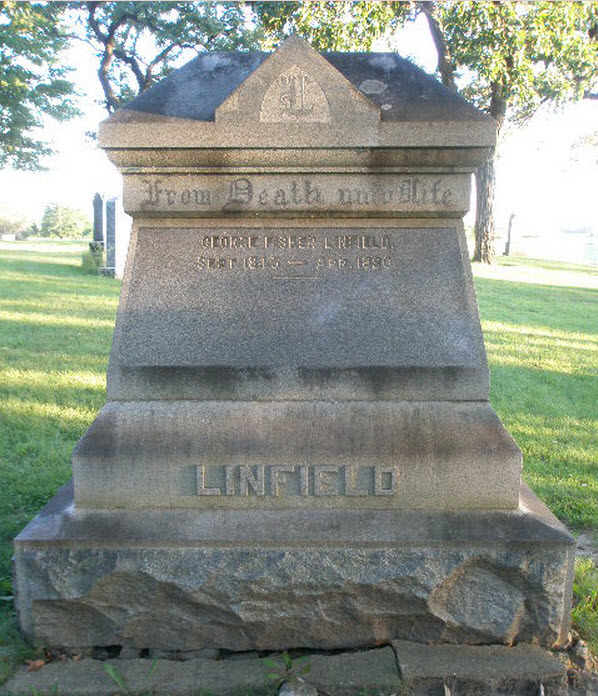
The Grave of George Fisher Linfield, Oakwood Cemetery, Beaver Dam, Wisconsin

The Rev. George Fisher Linfield (1846–1890) was an American clergyman and educator. Linfield College (now Linfield University) in McMinnville, Oregon, was named in his honor.

Linfield was born September 6, 1846, at Randolph, Massachusetts. He was the son of John Porter Linfield and Louisa Fisher, both descended from early New England colonists.

Linfield graduated from the University of Rochester in New York, in 1873 and from the Rochester Theological Seminary in 1876. He was ordained as a Baptist minister January 4, 1877, in Moline, Illinois, where he served as pastor from 1876 to 1881. He was pastor at Muscatine, Iowa, in 1881 and 1882. He served as the principal of Wayland Academy in Beaver Dam, Wisconsin, from 1882 to 1890.

Linfield married Frances Eleanor Ross December 4, 1878, in Moline, Illinois. They had had one son, Ross Linfield, who died in infancy. Linfield died April 30, 1890, in Beaver Dam and was buried there in Oakwood Cemetery.

During their tenure at Wayland Academy, George and Frances agreed that they should dedicate their life savings to promote Christian education. This purpose was realized in 1922, when Mrs. Linfield gifted real estate she owned in Spokane, Washington, valued at $250,000, to McMinnville College in McMinnville, Oregon, a Baptist institution. In honor of the gift, the college changed its name to Linfield College.
