= Frances Linfield =

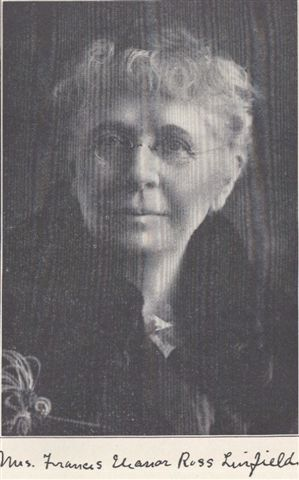
Frances Linfield (1852-1940)

Frances Ross Linfield was an American educator, social activist and philanthropist. In 1922, she made a gift to McMinnville College worth $250,000, prompting the school to change its name to Linfield College, in honor of her late husband, the Rev. George Fisher Linfield. In 2020, the school became Linfield University.

== Early life and family ==
Frances Eleanor Ross was born in Penfield, New York, January 4, 1852. She was the daughter of Oliver Chapin and Betsey (Shearman) Ross. Her paternal ancestry traces back to William and Hannah (Hungerford) Ross who came from Barbados in 1678 to settle at Westerly, Rhode Island. Her earliest maternal ancestors in America were Philip and Sarah (Oddings) Shearman who came from Dedham, Essex, England in 1634 to settle in Roxbury, Massachusetts.

== Education and career ==
Frances Ross graduated from Elmira College in Elmira, New York, in 1873 with the degree of Bachelor of Arts; a half-century later, her alma mater conferred upon her the Master of Arts degree. Her first teaching position was the high school in Englewood, Illinois, now a part of Chicago. In 1876, she became a teacher of English and Latin in the Pennsylvania State Normal School at Mansfield (now Mansfield University of Pennsylvania). From 1877 to 1878, Miss Ross served as preceptress at the Delaware Literary Institute at Franklin, New York, where she taught English and French. In 1884, she became teacher of German, history and literature at Wayland Academy in Beaver Dam, Wisconsin, where her husband served as the principal until his death in 1890. Mrs. Linfield left Wayland Academy in 1894 to continue her postgraduate studies at the University of Chicago.

Frances was called to the Pacific Northwest in 1895 in response to her ailing parents, then residents of Spokane, Washington. While devoting much of her time to care for her aged parents, she was appointed head of the department of modern languages at South Side High School (later Lewis and Clark High School), a position she held for seventeen years, until 1912. After her parents’ deaths, Frances Linfield took the position of Dean of Women at McMinnville College in McMinnville, Oregon, which she held from 1921 to 1928.

== Personal life ==
Frances Eleanor Ross married George Fisher Linfield on September 4, 1878, in Moline, Illinois. He was an ordained Baptist minister, worked as a teacher, and served as the principal of Wayland Academy. Mr. and Mrs. Linfield had had one son, Ross Linfield, who was born May 8, 1883, in Muscatine, Iowa. Ross died in infancy and was buried in Oakwood Cemetery at Beaver Dam, Dodge County, Wisconsin. The Rev. Linfield died April 30, 1890, in Beaver Dam, and also was buried in Oakwood Cemetery.

== Public service and philanthropy ==
During their tenure as instructors at Wayland Academy (and likely after the death of their young son, Ross), George and Frances Linfield determined that they should devote their life savings to promote Christian education. The original agreement between Mr. and Mrs. Linfield was that, if the Lord prospered them, they would someday make a generous contribution toward Christian education. In order to execute this plan, the couple agreed that during the first year, Rev. Linfield would pay all of their expenses, allowing Mrs. Linfield to invest her salary, while the succeeding year the plan should be reversed. Under this plan Mrs. Linfield invested $2,300 in real estate in Spokane, Washington. Using her own funds as well as those of her late husband, and property that she inherited from her parents, Mrs. Linfield made similar investments which continually grew in value.

In 1922, she made a gift to McMinnville College of her real estate holdings in Spokane, which were valued at $250,000. (According to the U.S. Bureau of Labor Statistic's Consumer Price Index Inflation Calculator, $250,000 in 1922 would equate to nearly $3,800,000 in 2020.) As a condition of the gift, the school changed its name to Linfield College in honor of her late husband, the Rev. George Fisher Linfield.

The Spokane properties involved in her donation included a site at 714 W. Main Street, which Mrs. Linfield originally purchased for $2,300. It was later sold to S. H. Kress & Co. for $100,000. Property on Monroe Street between Sprague and First Streets that was originally owned by her father as early as 1889, was sold to Lee Hammond of the Hammond Tire company in 1928, also for $100,000. As of 1940, Linfield College retained ownership of a lot at the northwest corner of Sprague and Monroe, which was then occupied by the Cohn Brothers furniture store and the Fox garage.

During her residence in Spokane, Mrs. Linfield was a member of the Grace Baptist Church, and was very active in Baptist affairs. She served as counselor on the state convention board of eastern Washington and northern Idaho and also on the board of the Deaconess Hospital in Spokane. She served for many years as the Vice President of the Woman's American Baptist Foreign Missionary Society. She also held memberships in the American Association of University Women, the Daughters of the American Revolution, and the Woman's Christian Temperance Union. From 1922 until her death, in 1940, Mrs. Linfield sat on the Board of Directors of Linfield College.

== Death ==
Frances Linfield died March 26, 1940, at her home in Portland, Oregon. She is buried at Lincoln Memorial Park in Portland.
