= Rebecca L. Johnson =

American natural resource economist and academic administrator (born 1955)

Interim president of Linfield University
- Incumbent
- Assumed office December 2023
- Preceded by: Miles K. Davis

Interim president of Oregon State University
- In office 2021–2022
- Preceded by: F. Alexander King
- Succeeded by: Jayathi Murthy

Personal details
- Born: 1955 (age 70–71) Madison, Wisconsin, U.S.
- Education: University of Wisconsin–Madison; Michigan State University

Rebecca L. Johnson (born 1955) is an American natural resource economist and academic administrator serving as the interim president of Linfield University since 2023. Her research focuses on the economic valuation of non-market natural resources, including recreation, wildlife, and biodiversity. She was the interim president of Oregon State University from 2021 to 2022 and served as the vice president of Oregon State University–Cascades from 2008 to 2022.

== Early life and education ==
Johnson was born in 1955 in Madison, Wisconsin, where she was raised. Her family vacationed at a lake cabin in northern Wisconsin, which contributed to her early interest in natural resources. Johnson attended the University of Wisconsin–Madison, earning a B.A. in economics in 1977. While enrolled, she participated in varsity basketball and golf.

She pursued graduate studies at Michigan State University, earning a M.S. in agricultural economics in 1981 and a Ph.D. in agricultural economics with minors in resource economics, policy analysis, and quantitative methods in 1985. Her doctoral dissertation examined the impact of user fees on grain exports from the Great Lakes region, focusing on transportation economics and trade.

== Career ==
=== Early career and research ===
In 1984, Johnson began her academic career as an assistant professor in the department of resource recreation management at Oregon State University's (OSU) college of forestry. Her early research focused on the economic valuation of non-market resources, including recreation, fish and wildlife, and biodiversity.

Her scholarship included analyses of tourism economics, wildlife management, and forest resource use. Notable publications addressed topics such as the economic impacts of tourism, the valuation of recreational sites, and the effects of land use decisions on natural resource management. She contributed to research on public participation in wildlife management and the economic effects of forest management on neighboring properties. Johnson's work often involved interdisciplinary approaches, combining quantitative modeling with policy analysis to address resource management challenges.

From 1990 to 2000, Johnson served as an associate professor in the department of forest resources. During this period, she also participated in service roles, including membership on the governor of Oregon's council of economic advisors from 1990 to 2003. From 1991 to 1992, she was a visiting scholar at Lincoln University in New Zealand, focusing on resource management practices.

=== Academic administration ===
Johnson transitioned to administrative roles within OSU in 2000 when she became associate dean for academic affairs in the college of forestry. In this capacity, she managed student services, oversaw accreditation processes, and supported efforts to increase student diversity through initiatives such as the Latinos in Forestry Program and partnerships with schools.

In 2002, Johnson chaired the OSU 2007 steering committee, which coordinated the university's strategic planning process. Her leadership in this role led to her appointment as vice provost for academic affairs and international programs in 2004, a position she held until 2008. Her responsibilities included overseeing academic support units, international collaborations, and diversity hiring initiatives.

In December 2008, Johnson was appointed interim vice president of Oregon State University–Cascades. Her role became permanent in May 2009. Under her leadership, OSU-Cascades expanded from an upper-division capstone program to a four-year university, offering undergraduate and graduate programs.

Johnson played a central role in securing state funding for campus expansion, navigating land use challenges, and introducing new programs, including engineering, hospitality management, and outdoor products. During her tenure, the campus grew to include over 1,000 students and a 128-acre campus. She remained vice president of OSU-Cascades until 2022.

Following the resignation of F. Alexander King in 2021, Johnson was named interim president of OSU. She served during the 2021 to 2022 academic year and was succeeded by Jayathi Murthy. After leaving OSU, she was named interim president of Linfield University in December 2023, succeeding Miles K. Davis.
