= Lingfield, County Durham =

Locality in County Durham, England

Coordinates: 54.55527°N 1.519°W

Whinfield is a locality in County Durham, England. It is situated to the east of Darlington. The population of this Darlington ward, as recorded in the 2011 census, was 3,782.
