= News-Register (McMinnville) =

Weekly newspaper published in McMinnville, Oregon

- Type: Weekly newspaper
- Format: Broadsheet
- Owner: Bladine family
- Publisher: Jeb Bladine
- Editor: Ossie Bladine
- Founded: 1866
- Headquarters: O'Dell Building, 611 Third Street; McMinnville, Oregon, 97128; United States
- Circulation: 10,921 (as of 2008)
- ISSN: 1081-6631
- OCLC number: 28445003
- Website: newsregister.com

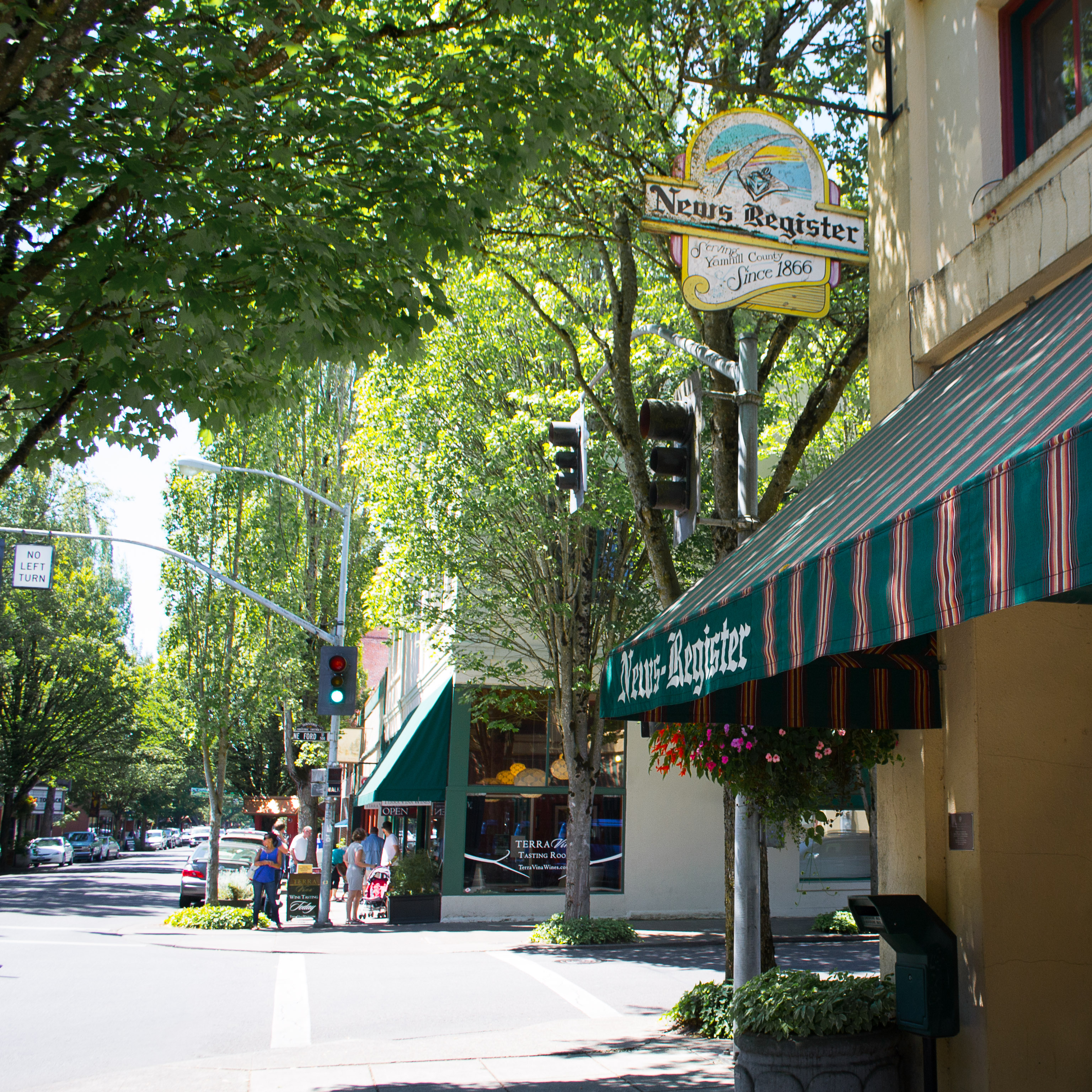
News-Register in McMinnville, Oregon

The News-Register is a newspaper published in McMinnville, Oregon, United States. It is a weekly community newspaper serving McMinnville and the surrounding Yamhill Valley. The News-Register Publishing Co. and parent holding company Oregon Lithoprint, Inc. are a closely held corporation owned by members of the Bladine family of McMinnville.

== History ==
=== Predecessor companies ===
The News-Register has origins in several Yamhill County newspaper companies dating to 1866. The earliest of these companies, the Lafayette Courier began publishing in 1866. By 1872 the newspaper had moved to McMinnville, anticipating the 1889 vote to move the county seat from Lafayette to McMinnville, and become the Yamhill County Reporter. In 1905 the Reporter merged with the McMinnville News, itself founded in 1901, to become the News-Reporter. Meanwhile, a separate branch of the News-Register's family tree began in 1881 with the Oregon Register, also of Lafayette. In 1886, the West Side Telephone was founded in McMinnville. These newspapers merged to form the Telephone-Register in 1889.

In 1928 the company was purchased by Lars Bladine. Then a writer for and owner of newspapers in Iowa, Bladine first visited nearby Portland, Oregon, in 1905 for the Lewis and Clark Centennial Exposition. Bladine's eldest son, Jack, relocated to McMinnville to begin family operation of the newspaper. Lars and his family, including younger son Philip, moved to Oregon permanently in 1932. The Telephone Register won the National Editorial Association award for general excellence for weekly newspapers in 1939, a year in which several Oregon papers won national recognition. In 1953, Jack and his brother Philip Bladine bought out the News-Reporter and combined it with the Telephone-Register, forming the News-Register on February 12, 1953.

=== Family ownership ===
Lars Bladine was publisher of the Telephone-Register until his death in 1941. Jack followed his father as publisher. Philip became editor, and became publisher in 1957 following his brother's death. Philip Bladine remained editor of the News-Register until 1974, when he turned the job over to his son, Jon E. "Jeb" Bladine. Philip's wife Meg Bladine also worked in the business office. Jack's son William Bladine served as managing editor from 1980 to 1991. Philip remained president of the company until 1983 and publisher until 1991, when Jeb assumed that role as well. Jeb Bladine is one of half a dozen third-generation Oregon editor-publishers.

In 1989, following three years of negotiations, Philip Bladine and members of his immediate family bought Oregon Lithoprint from other Bladine family members through acquisition of 50 percent of the stock. Terms of the sale included three pieces of property in downtown McMinnville. Philip's wife Margaret, a corporate secretary, plus son Jeb and daughter Pamela joined in the purchase. The sellers were managing editor William Bladine and sisters, Patricia Griffin and Phyllis Anusich.

In the late 1997, the company opened a state-of-the-art $4 million web press facility to produce the newspaper and accommodate its growing commercial printing business. In 2000, the newsroom expanded into the historic O'Dell Building, a former gas station and warehouse built in 1904. The renovation cost $400,000 and was overseen by Michelle Bladine, wife of Jeb.

Jeb Bladine is the current president of the parent firm and publisher of the newspaper. His son, Philip Ossie Bladine, took over as editor in 2014 and now is associate publisher and general manager. Members of the Bladine family remain sole shareholders in the company and continue to serve on its board of directors. In 2024, Jeb Bladine was inducted into the Oregon Newspaper Hall of Fame.

=== Trent UFO photos ===
In a noteworthy event, the Telephone-Register ran front-page photographs of a supposed UFO on June 8, 1950, taken nearly one month earlier by a farming couple, Paul and Evelyn Trent in nearby Sheridan. Published under the headline, "At Long Last—Authentic Photographs Of Flying Saucer[?]", the photographs became a sensation, and received an overwhelming response when Philip offered, in a nationally broadcast interview, to send a copy of the paper, at cost, to anyone who requested one. Philip later participated in a 50th anniversary celebration of the photo at McMenamins Hotel Oregon's annual UFO Festival.

== Operations ==
=== Sections ===
The paper focuses on local news and features. Its Tuesday edition features local news and sports, local columnists, and news about local citizens and activities. The paper's Friday edition includes more of the same, plus a Viewpoints section featuring guest essays, editorials, letters to the editor and an opinion column by the publisher. The newspaper reports sports at two nearby colleges and seven Yamhill County high schools.

=== Coverage ===
Noteworthy stories covered by the News-Register in recent years include allegations of sexual abuse of a 14-year-old male student by a teacher's aide, the wife of the local district attorney. When the case became a matter of national interest, the News-Register went to court to obtain access to public records involving the incident. The teacher's aide later pleaded guilty.

The News-Register has also focused on Oregon Route 18, the highway connecting McMinnville to the Oregon Coast, which had become notorious for a high number of fatal accidents. Despite an assertion by the governor that there was "no money for road-improvement projects," the coverage pressured county and state officials to improve the unsafe highway, including rumble strips, brighter stripes and increased police patrols.

In 2000, the paper also reported on the plight of Brandy Stroeder, a McMinnville student suffering from cystic fibrosis, who had been denied a heart-and-lung transplant by the Oregon Health Plan. The case drew national headlines and a campaign by Oregon businessman Mark Hemstreet which raised more than $250,000 for the operation.

=== Frequency ===
The News-Register was published six days a week from 1953 to 1958 before returning to a twice-weekly schedule. In 1976 the paper changed to a tri-weekly publication schedule. Except for a few years in the early 1990s, the paper maintained this frequency for 33 years. In 2009 the paper became a semi-weekly, with deliveries Wednesday afternoon and Saturday morning, later changing to publication delivered via mail on Tuesdays and Fridays. In November 2023, it was announced that sometime in early 2024 the paper will eliminate one of its two weekly print editions, reduce page size by 25% and expand its e-editions to three times a week.

== Distinctions ==
The News-Register has won many state and national awards, from the Oregon Newspaper Publishers Association (ONPA) for investigative reporting and National Newspaper Association for community coverage. In 2000, the ONPA named the News-Register Oregon's best community paper in its category, and from 1998 to 2005 was seven times awarded the "Sweepstakes Award" recognizing the state's most-honored non-daily newspaper.

Lars, Jack, Philip and Jeb Bladine have all served as presidents of the Oregon Newspaper Publishers Association.

== Notable reporters ==
New York Times columnist Nicholas Kristof, who grew up in nearby Yamhill, began his journalism career reporting for the paper at age 16.

== Related businesses ==
Oregon Lithograph prints newspapers and magazines, college course schedules, catalogs, telephone directories and, for many years, the Oregon Voters' Pamphlet.

The company also helped create the McMinnville Access Company, better known as OnlineNW, an Internet Service Provider serving the McMinnville area from space shared with the News-Register. McMinnville Access Company was sold 2021 to Hunter Communications.
