= The Linfield Review =

- Type: Student newspaper
- Format: Tabloid
- Owner(s): Independent
- Founded: 1895
- Headquarters: McMinnville, Oregon
- Website: thelinfieldreview.com

The Linfield Review is a weekly newspaper published by students at Linfield College in McMinnville, Oregon, United States. It is distributed free across campus. Subscriptions cost $35 per year.

== Awards ==
Since 1999, The Linfield Review has won a number of awards in the Oregon Newspaper Publishers Association's Collegiate Newspaper Contest, among four-year college or university newspapers publishing weekly, bi-weekly, or monthly. In 2007, the paper earned twelve first-place awards and three second-place awards in that contest.
