= McMinnville, Oregon =

McMinnville
- City
- McMinnville, Oregon
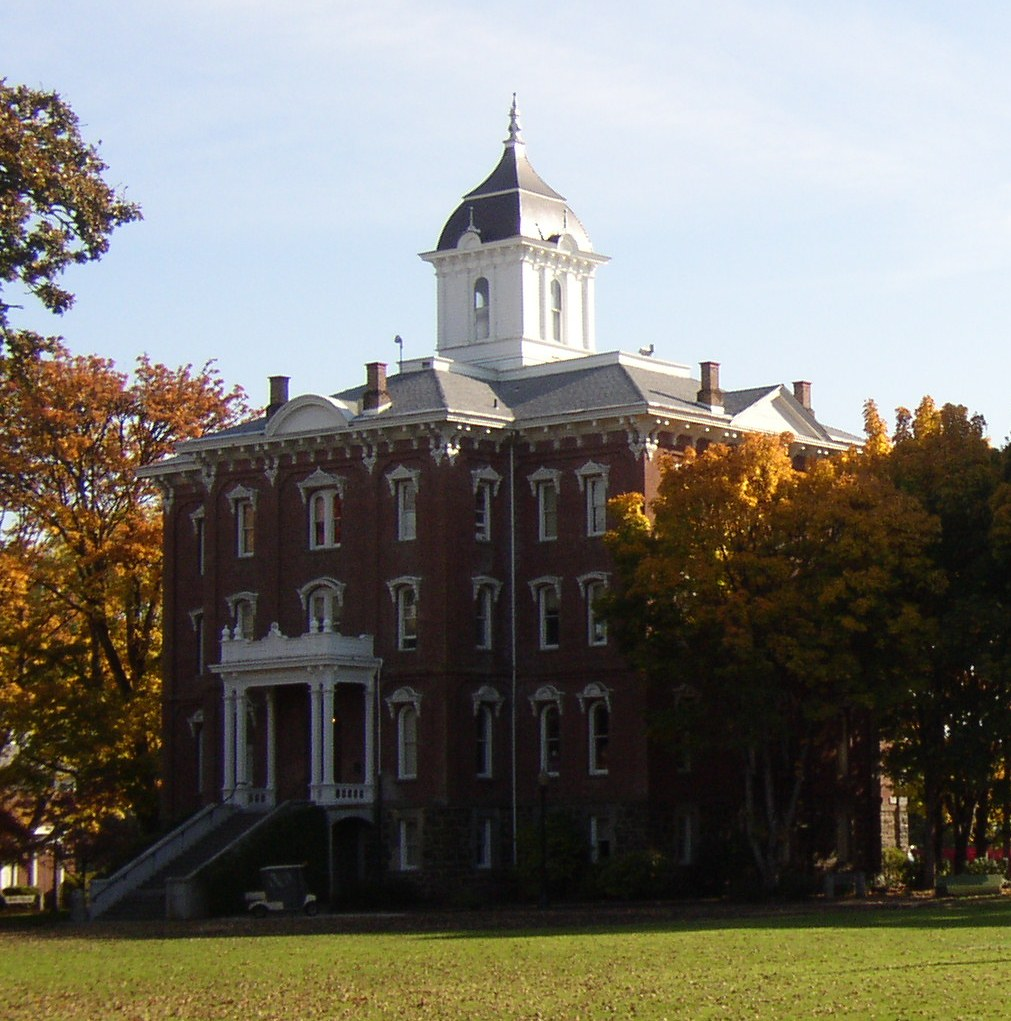
- Pioneer Hall at Linfield University
- Nickname: Mac
- Location in Oregon
- Coordinates: 45°12′39″N 123°11′50″W
- Country: United States
- State: Oregon
- County: Yamhill
- Founded: 1856
- Incorporated: 1876
- Named for: McMinnville, Tennessee

Government
  - Mayor: Kim Morris

Area
  - Total: 10.58 sq mi (27.40 km^{2})
  - Land: 10.58 sq mi (27.40 km^{2})
  - Water: 0 sq mi (0.00 km^{2})
- Elevation: 161 ft (49 m)

Population (2020)
  - Total: 34,319
  - Density: 3,244.1/sq mi (1,252.54/km^{2})
- Time zone: UTC−8 (Pacific)
  - Summer (DST): UTC−7 (Pacific)
- ZIP code: 97128
- Area codes: 503, 971
- FIPS code: 41-45000
- GNIS feature ID: 2411065
- Website: www.mcminnvilleoregon.gov

McMinnville is the county seat of and the most populous city in Yamhill County, Oregon, United States, at the base of the Oregon Coast Range. As of the 2020 census, the city had a population of 34,319.

McMinnville is located in the Willamette Valley at the confluence of the North and South forks of the Yamhill River. The city's economy has both industry and service businesses as well as the Evergreen Aviation & Space Museum, home of Howard Hughes's famed Spruce Goose flying boat. Linfield University provides higher education.

== History ==
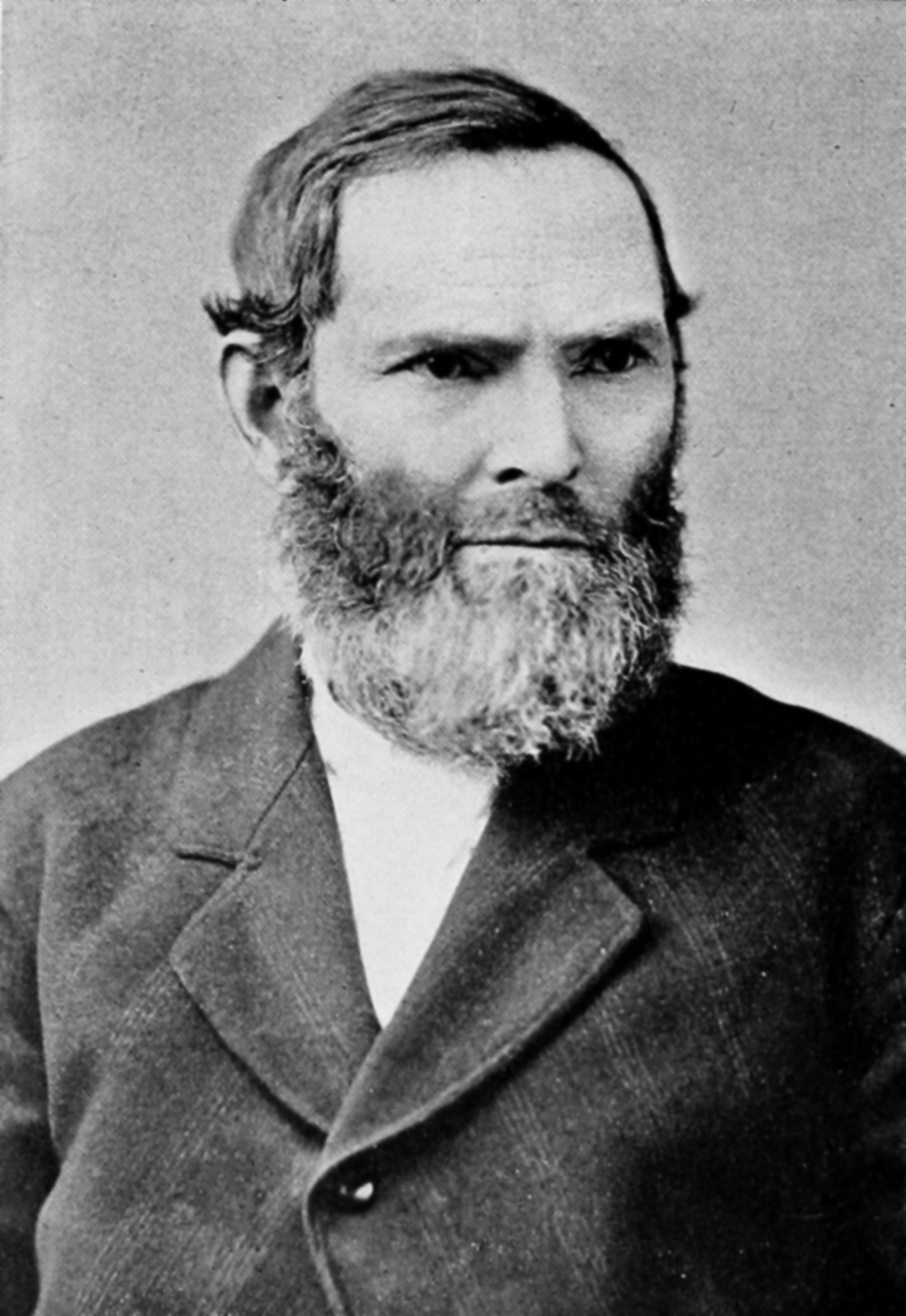
McMinnville founder William T. Newby

McMinnville founder William T. Newby joined the Great Migration of 1843, of people from the eastern states to the west. He later claimed land in 1844 on the present site of McMinnville in what was known as the Oregon Country, next to the claim of John G. Baker then sheriff. In 1853, Newby built a grist mill at what would become the west end of Third Street. On May 5, 1856, Newby platted a town and named it after his hometown of McMinnville, Tennessee. The plat was not recorded until July 1865, despite Newby receiving his U.S. patent in October 1858.

The Baptists opened a private school in 1849, which was chartered as the Baptist College in 1858 under the territorial government. This school was later named McMinnville College after founder Newby made a substantial donation of land to support founding an institution of higher learning in the town. It received a substantial property donation from Frances R. Linfield, the widow of Reverend George F. Linfield. It was originally called McMinnville College. It is known today as Linfield University.

McMinnville was incorporated as a town in 1876 and became a city in 1882. County residents voted to move the county seat of Yamhill County from Lafayette to McMinnville in 1886.

== Geography ==
McMinnville is located 54 miles (87 km) northeast of Lincoln City on the Pacific Ocean, 37 miles (60 km) southwest of Portland, and 26 miles (42 km) northwest of Salem, the state capital.

According to the United States Census Bureau, the city has an area of 10.58 square miles (27.40 km^{2}), all of it land.

=== Climate ===
This region experiences warm (but not hot) and dry summers, with no average monthly temperatures above 71.6 °F (22.0 °C). Just 43 miles from the Pacific Coastal community of Lincoln City, McMinnville will often see a marine layer offering cool foggy days. A warm summer day makes a quick beach trip an ideal feature of living in McMinnville. According to the Köppen Climate Classification system, McMinnville has a warm-summer Mediterranean climate, abbreviated "Csb" on climate maps. The normal monthly mean temperature ranges from 40.5 °F (4.7 °C) in December to 67.5 °F (19.7 °C) in August. Annual precipitation averages 37.64 inches (956 mm), with normal monthly precipitation peaking in November. The lowest temperature recorded is −7 °F (−22 °C) on January 31, 1950, while the highest is 114 °F (46 °C), most recently on June 28, 2021.

Climate data for McMinnville, Oregon (1991−2020 normals, extremes 1894−present)
Month	Jan	Feb	Mar	Apr	May	Jun	Jul	Aug	Sep	Oct	Nov	Dec	Year
Record high °F (°C)	69 (21)	72 (22)	87 (31)	99 (37)	100 (38)	114 (46)	110 (43)	108 (42)	106 (41)	95 (35)	75 (24)	72 (22)	114 (46)
Mean maximum °F (°C)	57.7 (14.3)	61.3 (16.3)	69.0 (20.6)	77.1 (25.1)	86.2 (30.1)	91.4 (33.0)	97.6 (36.4)	97.9 (36.6)	92.8 (33.8)	78.3 (25.7)	63.5 (17.5)	58.1 (14.5)	100.5 (38.1)
Mean daily maximum °F (°C)	47.3 (8.5)	51.0 (10.6)	55.7 (13.2)	60.5 (15.8)	68.0 (20.0)	73.7 (23.2)	82.7 (28.2)	83.1 (28.4)	77.0 (25.0)	64.0 (17.8)	52.6 (11.4)	46.5 (8.1)	63.5 (17.5)
Daily mean °F (°C)	41.3 (5.2)	43.2 (6.2)	46.4 (8.0)	50.1 (10.1)	56.1 (13.4)	61.0 (16.1)	67.3 (19.6)	67.5 (19.7)	62.6 (17.0)	53.2 (11.8)	45.3 (7.4)	40.5 (4.7)	52.9 (11.6)
Mean daily minimum °F (°C)	35.2 (1.8)	35.3 (1.8)	37.1 (2.8)	39.7 (4.3)	44.3 (6.8)	48.3 (9.1)	51.9 (11.1)	51.9 (11.1)	48.2 (9.0)	42.3 (5.7)	37.9 (3.3)	34.4 (1.3)	42.2 (5.7)
Mean minimum °F (°C)	24.1 (−4.4)	25.8 (−3.4)	28.9 (−1.7)	31.0 (−0.6)	34.7 (1.5)	40.2 (4.6)	44.5 (6.9)	44.1 (6.7)	39.0 (3.9)	31.5 (−0.3)	26.7 (−2.9)	23.8 (−4.6)	19.2 (−7.1)
Record low °F (°C)	−7 (−22)	1 (−17)	14 (−10)	24 (−4)	24 (−4)	31 (−1)	34 (1)	30 (−1)	25 (−4)	20 (−7)	9 (−13)	−5 (−21)	−7 (−22)
Average precipitation inches (mm)	5.51 (140)	4.08 (104)	4.17 (106)	2.99 (76)	1.99 (51)	1.32 (34)	0.25 (6.4)	0.36 (9.1)	1.30 (33)	3.48 (88)	5.74 (146)	6.45 (164)	37.64 (957.5)
Average precipitation days (≥ 0.01 in)	19.0	16.1	19.4	16.4	13.1	8.0	2.4	2.7	7.2	14.7	19.3	19.3	157.6
Mean monthly sunshine hours	75.4	118.0	201.3	240.5	282.8	297.7	348.5	317.3	251.4	174.2	88.6	74.7	2,470.4
Average ultraviolet index	2	2	3	3	4	5	6	5	4	3	2	2	3
Source 1: NOAA
Source 2: weatherspark, Weather Atlas (UV)

== Demographics ==
Historical population
Census	Pop.	Note	%±
1870	388		—
1880	670		72.7%
1890	1,368		104.2%
1900	1,420		3.8%
1910	2,400		69.0%
1920	2,767		15.3%
1930	2,917		5.4%
1940	3,706		27.0%
1950	6,635		79.0%
1960	7,656		15.4%
1970	10,125		32.2%
1980	14,080		39.1%
1990	17,894		27.1%
2000	26,499		48.1%
2010	32,187		21.5%
2020	34,319		6.6%
U.S. Decennial Census; 2018 Estimate

=== 2020 census ===
As of the 2020 census, McMinnville had a population of 34,319. The median age was 38.6 years. 22.0% of residents were under the age of 18 and 20.3% of residents were 65 years of age or older. For every 100 females there were 91.3 males, and for every 100 females age 18 and over there were 88.1 males age 18 and over.

99.9% of residents lived in urban areas, while 0.1% lived in rural areas.

There were 12,490 households in McMinnville, of which 31.4% had children under the age of 18 living in them. Of all households, 47.6% were married-couple households, 15.6% were households with a male householder and no spouse or partner present, and 28.8% were households with a female householder and no spouse or partner present. About 26.0% of all households were made up of individuals and 14.0% had someone living alone who was 65 years of age or older.

There were 13,257 housing units, of which 5.8% were vacant. Among occupied housing units, 59.5% were owner-occupied and 40.5% were renter-occupied. The homeowner vacancy rate was 1.1% and the rental vacancy rate was 6.3%.

Racial composition as of the 2020 census
Race	Number	Percent
White	25,005	72.9%
Black or African American	200	0.6%
American Indian and Alaska Native	527	1.5%
Asian	475	1.4%
Native Hawaiian and Other Pacific Islander	88	0.3%
Some other race	4,022	11.7%
Two or more races	4,002	11.7%
Hispanic or Latino (of any race)	8,195	23.9%

=== 2010 census ===
As of the census of 2010, there were 32,187 people, 11,674 households, and 7,779 families living in the city. The population density was 3,042.2 inhabitants per square mile (1,174.6/km^{2}). There were 12,389 housing units at an average density of 1,171.0 per square mile (452.1/km^{2}). The racial makeup of the city was 82.2% White, 0.7% African American, 1.2% Native American, 1.5% Asian, 0.2% Pacific Islander, 10.7% from other races, and 3.5% from two or more races. Hispanic or Latino of any race were 20.6% of the population.

There were 11,674 households, of which 35.5% had children under the age of 18 living with them, 48.2% were married couples living together, 13.0% had a female householder with no husband present, 5.4% had a male householder with no wife present, and 33.4% were non-families. 26.4% of all households were made up of individuals, and 12.4% had someone living alone who was 65 years of age or older. The average household size was 2.61 and the average family size was 3.14.

The median age in the city was 34 years. 25.8% of residents were under the age of 18; 12.7% were between the ages of 18 and 24; 24.7% were from 25 to 44; 22.2% were from 45 to 64; and 14.6% were 65 years of age or older. The gender makeup of the city was 48.2% male and 51.8% female.

=== 2000 census ===
As of the census of 2000, there were 26,499 people living in the city, among 9,367 households and 6,463 families. The population density was 2,675.8 inhabitants per square mile (1,033.1/km^{2}). There were 9,834 housing units at an average density of 993.0 per square mile (383.4/km^{2}). The racial makeup of the city was 86.39% White, 1.39% Native American, 1.25% Asian, 0.68% Black or African American, and 0.18% Pacific Islander. 14.64% of the population were Hispanic or Latino of any race. 7.26% identify themselves as from other races, and 2.86% from two or more races.

There were 9,367 households, out of which 35.4% had children under the age of 18 living with them, 53.5% were married couples living together, 10.8% had a female householder with no husband present, and 31.0% were non-families. 23.9% of all households were made up of individuals, and 11.5% had someone living alone who was 65 years of age or older. The average household size was 2.66 and the average family size was 3.13.

In the city, the population was spread out, with 26.3% under the age of 18, 14.7% from 18 to 24, 26.9% from 25 to 44, 17.9% from 45 to 64, and 14.3% who were 65 years of age or older. The median age was 32 years. For every 100 females, there were 93.7 males. For every 100 females age 18 and over, there were 90.6 males.

The median income for a household in the city was $38,953, and the median income for a family was $44,013. Males had a median income of $33,517 versus $24,405 for females. The per capita income for the city was $17,085. 12.9% of the population and 8.2% of families were below the poverty line. Out of the total population, 14.0% of those under the age of 18 and 7.8% of those 65 and older were living below the poverty line.

== Economy ==
As of 2020, McMinnville's top employers were the Willamette Valley Medical Center, Linfield University, and Cascade Steel Rolling Mills.

First Federal Savings and Loan Association, headquartered in McMinnville, was founded in 1922. Founded in 1894, Oregon Mutual Insurance is located in downtown McMinnville.

=== Agriculture ===
Agriculture remains a top industry in the county. Since the late 20th century, winemaking has been developed throughout the Willamette Valley. The majority of the vineyards of the Willamette Valley American Viticultural Area (AVA) are in the area surrounding McMinnville. It identifies as the capital of Oregon's wine industry. In January 2005, a McMinnville AVA was established. The AVA includes 14 wineries and 523 acres (2.12 km^{2}) within the Willamette Valley AVA. The city is at the northeastern border of its AVA namesake. Linfield University expanded to offer a B.A. or B.S. in wine studies in 2021.

=== Manufacturing ===
Cascade Steel specializes in producing finished steel products from recycled steel. Cascade Steel Rolling Mills uses electric arc furnace (EAF) mini-mill production for a wide range of hot rolled products including rebar, coiled reinforcing bar, wire rod, and merchant bar. Cascade Steel operates as a subsidiary of Radius Recycling.

In 2016, Organic Valley purchased Farmers Cooperative Creamery in McMinnville. It serves 72 co-op members in Oregon and Washington. The company claims to be the nation's largest farmer-owned organic cooperative and one of the world's largest organic consumer brands. In 2021, a massive 3-alarm fire decimated the McMinnville Creamery, forcing residents to evacuate a 1/2-mile radius. The company rebuilt the plant, which is operating again.

== Arts and culture ==
=== Annual cultural events ===
Established in 1993, the Sip! McMinnville Wine & Food Classic is a three-day event held every March at the Evergreen Aviation and Space Museum. It features local winemakers and vintners alongside chefs from the Pacific Northwest, and attendees can taste and purchase wine and food.

In May, the UFO Festival honors the McMinnville UFO photographs by celebrating extraterrestrial beings with food, music, and activities for kids.

In 2019 the Oregon International Air Show was moved to the McMinnville Municipal Airport. The annual airshow, held every September, promotes aviation and honors the US military and veterans.

Turkey Rama was a three-day festival held in downtown McMinnville for 61 years, started by turkey farmers in Yamhill County when the county's main source of wealth was the turkey-farming industry. While the festival ended in 2023, smaller celebrations remain.

The International Pinot Noir Celebration was held every July between 1987 and 2024 on the Linfield University campus. The IPNC was a three-day event in which winemakers, northwest chefs, media, epicures and wine lovers gathered, but it had its final event in 2024.

=== Museums and other points of interest ===
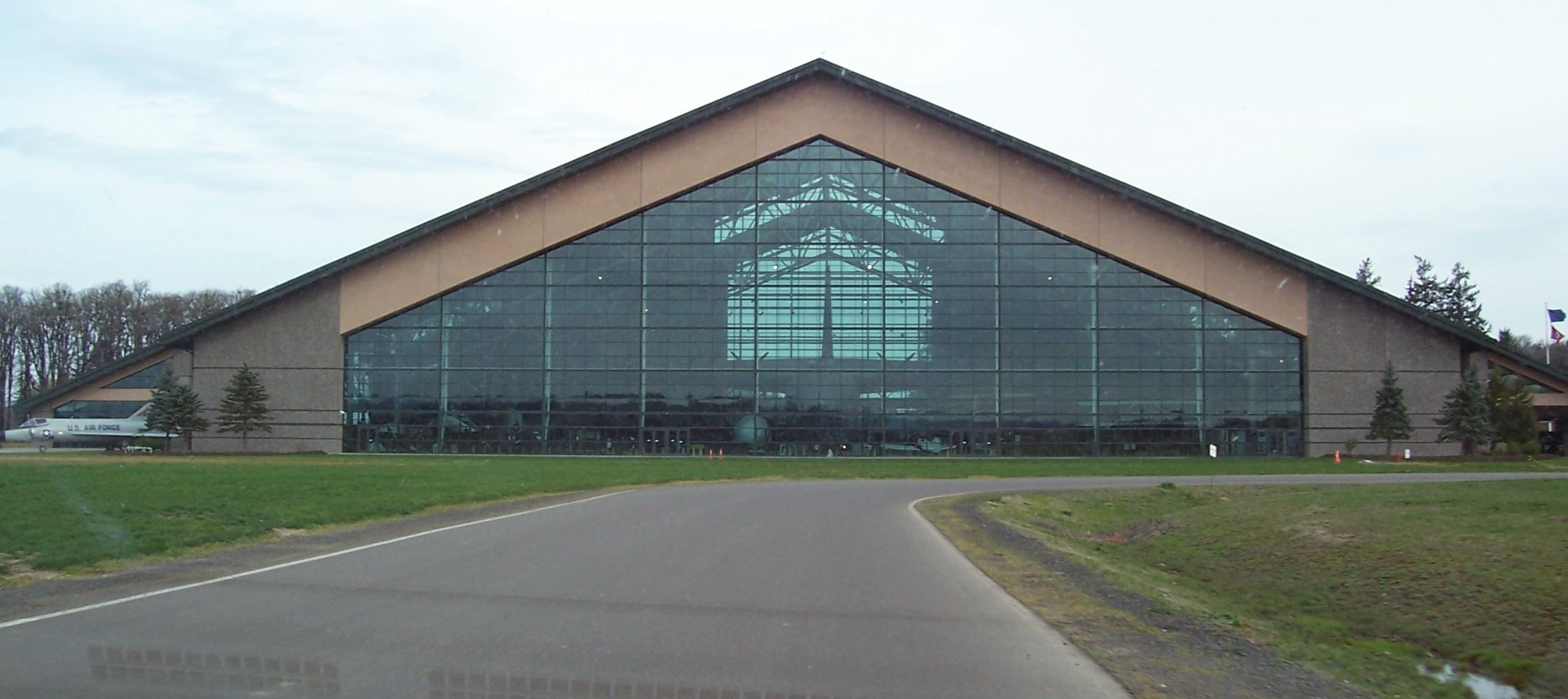
The Evergreen Aviation Museum

The Evergreen Aviation and Space Museum is best known as the home of the Spruce Goose, the world's largest propeller-driven seaplane, built by the famed aviator Howard Hughes.

The museum, home to another 80 historic aircraft and exhibits, is a pair of large symmetrical buildings with glass facades, a local landmark which can be seen for miles. Additional major exhibits include a SR-71 "Blackbird", a Titan II SLV Missile (with its launch control center), and a F117 "Lone Wolf." Connected, the Wings & Waves indoor waterpark contains a wave pool, 4 slides emerging from 747 on building's roof, and educational displays.

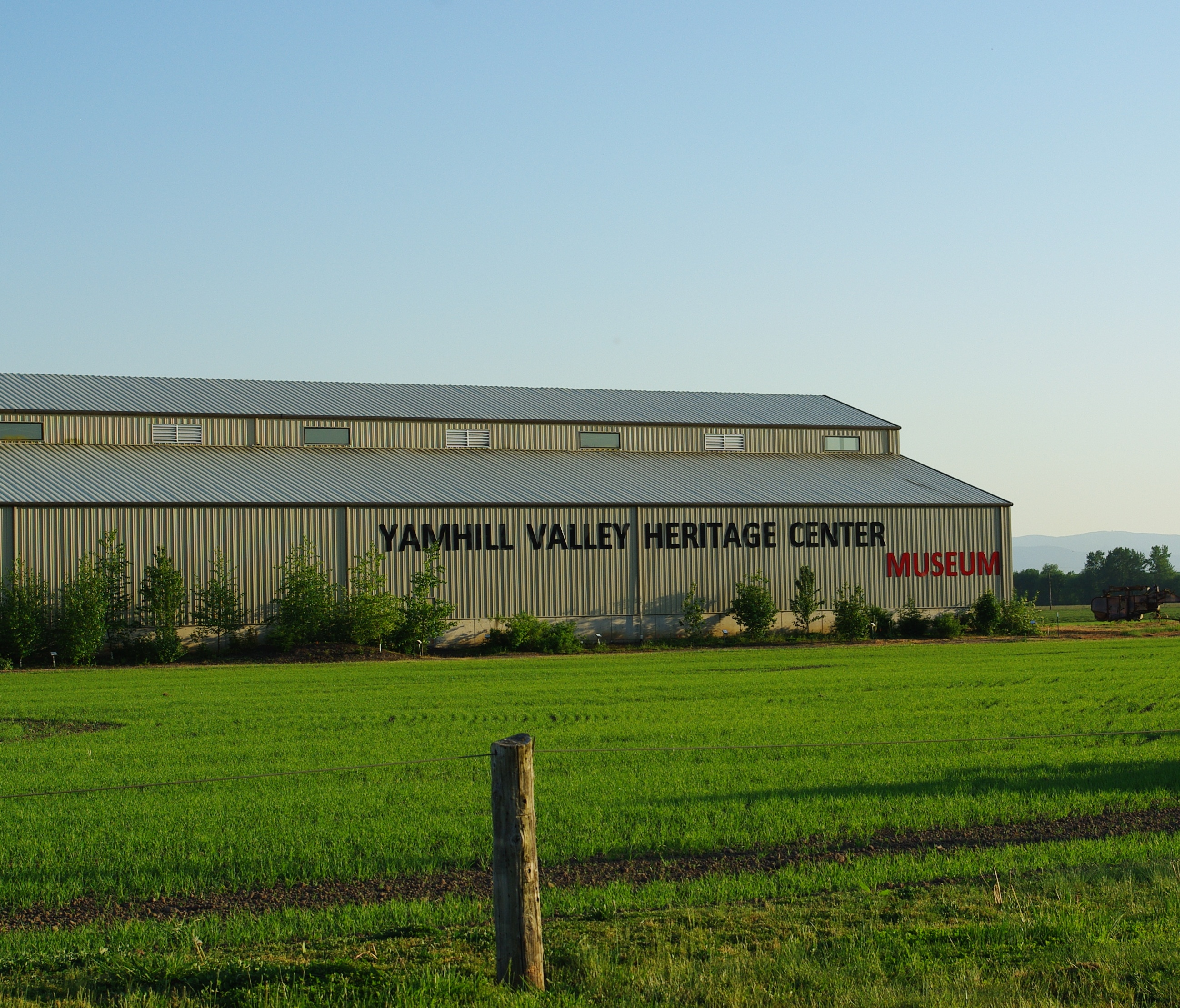
Yamhill Valley Heritage Center Museum

The Yamhill County History Museum is located southwest of McMinnville. The Museum hosts many annual events including Farm Fest in early April and Harvest Fest in mid August.

== Parks and recreation ==
McMinnville Community Center is headquarters for the McMinnville Parks and Recreation Department, which administers 18 parks throughout the city. The largest city park is the 100-acre sports field complex and community park named after a longtime city manager Joe Dancer. The city of McMinnville administers youth sports leagues in both baseball and basketball, along with many other competitive sports.

Joe Dancer Park has a dozen baseball and softball fields. The park also features soccer fields, playground equipment, and the Drew Ottley Memorial Skate Park.

Discovery Meadows Community Park also has a skate park, along with baseball and softball fields. This 22-acre community park has picnic shelters (available to rent), playgrounds, play structure w/towers, climbing walls, climbing boulders, water features, basketball courts, and walking pathways (1 mile paved) and trails (.95 mile soft) throughout.

City Park is within walking distance from the downtown business district. It opened in 1910, when the city sold $3,000 in park bonds to finance construction of a bandstand and a small zoo featuring bears, deer and other regional animals. Near the site of Lower City Park, the large flour mill, Star Mill, operated until 1921. After the remaining structure was damaged by fire in 1927, the city sold $8,500 in bonds to finance purchase of the property. The tract ran from Star Mill Way to Cozine Creek and West Second Street, to the mill pond site. The pond site was redeveloped as city tennis courts.

Wortman Park is a large forested park with a small stream running through it. A disc golf course, picnic areas, softball field, and playground are featred at the park.

Since 1956 the McMinnville Parks and Recreation Department has overseen the Aquatic Center, which includes two indoor swimming pools, a hot tub, and fitness center.

Michelbook Country Club, a private 18-hole par 72 championship golf course, was developed on the farmland of Captain Francis Michelbook. Land development in the area of the country club has been a factor in McMinnville's growth in the late 20th century. In the early 1960s, Kelton Peery, Chuck Colvin and Willard Cushing believed it was time for the city to have a private golf course and began to search for property. They soon persuaded Captain Francis Michelbook, former Commander of the Oregon National Guard's Third Infantry Company A, that a country club would be the proper use for his land. Captain Michelbook established certain conditions: the country club would bear his family name "Michelbook". The country club has a driving range, practice facility, golf shop and a Class A PGA Professional.

== Education ==
Along with several private schools, the city is serviced by a public school district and two institutions of higher education, Chemeketa Community College and Linfield University.

In 1858, Linfield University was founded as Baptist College of McMinnville. Later renamed McMinnville College and then Linfield College, in 2020 the Board of Trustees renamed the school Linfield University. Linfield is an independent, comprehensive institution of higher education for undergraduate and graduate studies in 56 unique majors. The university enrolls roughly 2,000 students from 24 states with nearly 95% of students utilizing financial aid.

Linfield University is located on nearly 200 acres with over 60 facilities. The Linfield University athletic program is part of the Northwest Conference, NCAA Division III rostering varsity sports, along with intercollegiate sports and activities. In 2020 the football program upgraded their facility with the largest scoreboard in NCAA Division III. The 1,800 square foot display measures in at 60 feet wide and 30 feet high. The football program notched its 64th consecutive winning season in 2019.

In the mid to late 1970s community locations for Chemeketa Community College expanded to McMinnville. Chemeketa Yamhill Valley received accreditation as a college campus in the fall of 2011, and McMinnville became the home of the second multi-campus community college in the state of Oregon. The Yamhill Valley campus provides numerous services including; academic advising, counseling support services, student clubs and activities, student accessibility services, library/tutoring centers, and open computer labs.

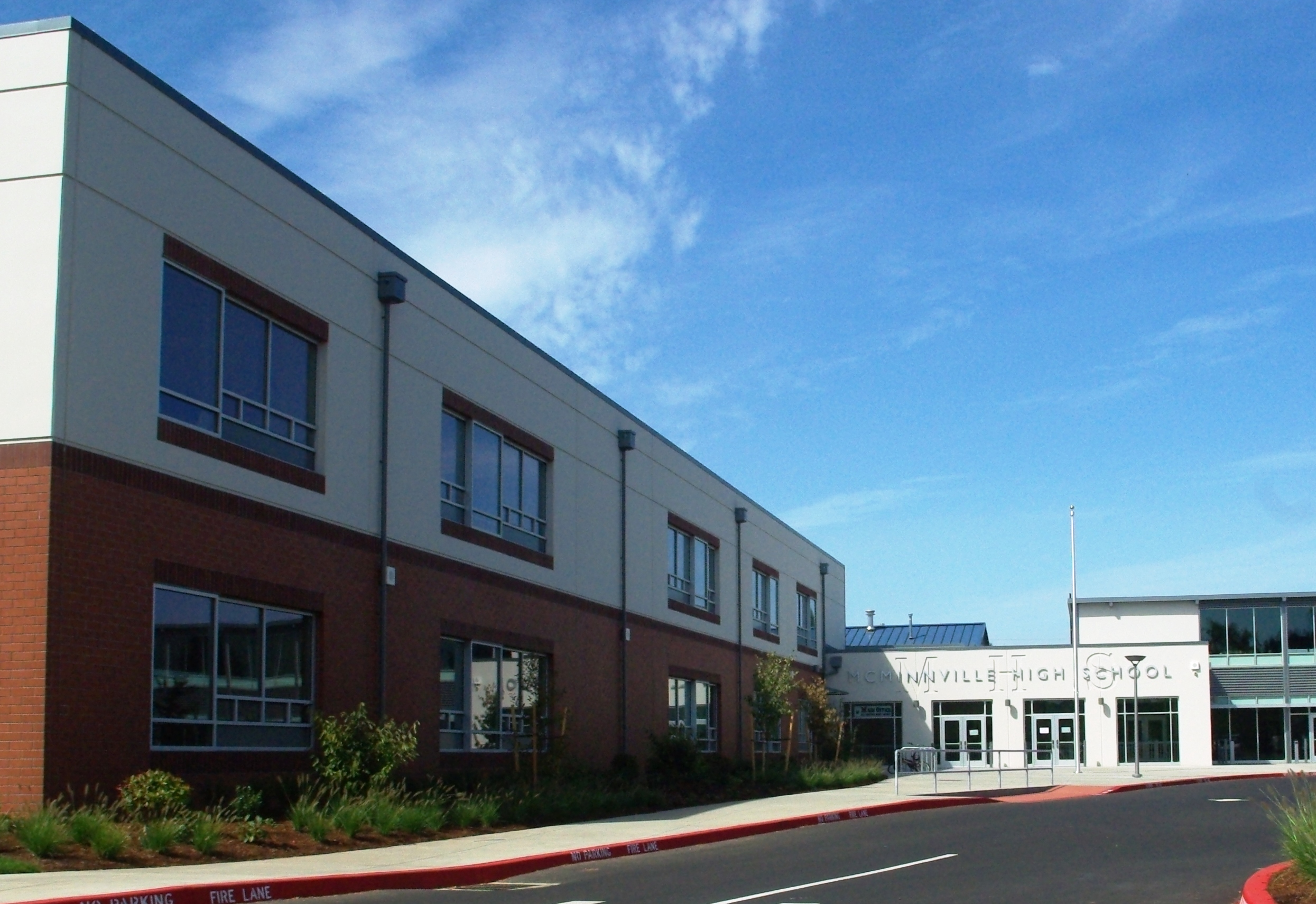
McMinnville High School

Nearly two decades after McMinnville College was founded, the city of McMinnville levied a tax to build the first public school house. The McMinnville School District is responsible for the education of nearly 7,000 K-12 school children. The McMinnville School District superintendent is Debbie Brocket. The largest high school of the county, McMinnville High School (MHS), has an enrollment of over 2,000 students.

Along with MHS, the school district offers two middle schools and five elementary schools in the city. Children from outside of the city limits and unincorporated areas of Yamhill County attend McMinnville City Schools. The school district also bears the burden of oversight, administration, and maintenance of Wascher Elementary in the nearby community of Lafayette, Oregon.

Private schools in McMinnville include the Montessori School, McMinnville Christian Academy (MCA) and St. James Catholic Elementary School. The McMinnville Montessori School provides before and after school care utilizing Joe Dancer and City Parks. McMinnville Christian Academy provides pre-school education all the way through middle-school. St James Catholic Elementary School recently implemented multi-age learning in all classrooms where students will stay with the same teacher over a period of two years.

== Media ==
- McMinnville Community Media
- News Register – County Newspaper
- KKJC-LP 93.5 FM – Christian talk radio operated by Calvary Chapel of McMinnville
- KLYC 1260 AM
- KSLC 90.3 FM – Linfield University student radio
- The Linfield Review – The student news site for Linfield University
- The Bruin – McMinnville High School student paper

== Infrastructure ==
=== Transportation ===
McMinnville is on Oregon Route 99W approximately 38 miles (61 km) south of downtown Portland and approximately 46 miles (74 km) north of Corvallis. Oregon Route 18 forms a bypass around the city along its southern border and connects McMinnville with the Oregon Coast just north of Lincoln City approximately 55 miles (89 km) west. Oregon Highway 18 is also known as Three Mile Lane from its McMinnville city center interchange east to the McMinnville Municipal Airport. The southern end of Oregon Route 47 is just northeast of city limits and connects McMinnville with Washington County.

Major thoroughfares in McMinnville are Highway 99W and Adams and Baker Streets which form a north–south couplet through the center of the town; Lafayette Avenue (which was at one time the route of U.S. Highway 99W), East Third Street (the main street through the downtown core), and West Second Street (the main street connecting downtown with the western residential areas). Baker Creek Road, Evans Street, Riverside Drive, South Davis Street, Fellows Street, Cypress Street and Booth Bend Road are also important collector streets connecting industrial or residential areas with the downtown core or the primary arterial streets.

McMinnville Municipal Airport is owned and operated by the City of McMinnville.

Since 1993, The Willamette & Pacific Railroad (W&P), doing business as the Portland & Western Railroad (P&W) serves McMinnville on its Westside Branch leased from the Union Pacific. Major railroad shippers include Cascade Steel Rolling Mills, Land O'Lakes Purina LLC, and McMinnville Gas. W&P/P&W maintains the historic 1912 Southern Pacific depot in downtown McMinnville, itself a remnant from the Southern Pacific Red Electric interurban passenger service which served McMinnville from 1914 until 1929. After demise of electrification, McMinnville depot continued in use for 64 years as Southern Pacific's local headquarters until the railroad was leased to Willamette & Pacific Railroad. McMinnville is a hub for P&W, with trains operating between McMinnville and Newberg, Willamina, Dallas and Albany.

Historically, McMinnville had a landing for riverboats traveling up the Yamhill River. The Yamhill Lock near Lafayette helped facilitate river navigation up to McMinnville. However, the use of the Yamhill River for commercial purposes was short-lived; the city's only recreational boat dock has been unusable for years. River levels are unpredictable and difficult for boaters (water levels can be very high in winter and very low in summer).

Public transit is provided by the Yamhill County Transit Area.

=== Electricity and water ===
Since 1888, the city has been served by McMinnville Water and Light, a municipal utility. Economic development experts cite low utility rates as an important recruiting effort with McMinnville offering the 2nd lowest electricity rates and the 3rd lowest water rates in the entire state.

=== Health care ===
Willamette Valley Medical Center, along the outskirts of McMinnville, is an 88-bed acute-care, full-service facility, accredited by The Joint Commission.

== Notable people ==
- Whitney Blake – Actress and mother of actress Meredith Baxter Birney
- Greg Brock – Major League Baseball (MLB) first baseman from 1982 to 1991
- Scott Brosius – Major League Baseball (MLB) World Series MVP Award-winning baseball player
- Jim Bunn – Oregon politician
- Troy Calhoun – NCAA Football Head Coach, Air Force
- Pat Casey – Oregon State University NCAA Baseball Head Coach
- Catt family – 21st Century bank-robbing family
- Beverly Cleary – Children's author, National Book Award and Newbery Medal recipient
- Verne Duncan – Oregon and Idaho politician
- Matthew Haughey – Noted blogger
- Bill Krueger – Major League Baseball (MLB) and Senior Baseball Analyst for Root Sports Northwest
- Elgen Long – Aviator, researcher and author
- Ehren McGhehey – Jackass cast member
- Lou Moon – comedian
- Joe Paterson – Major League Baseball (MLB) pitcher for Arizona Diamondbacks
- Ad Rutschman – College Football Hall of Fame Coach
- Ross Shafer – Comedian, television host, and motivational speaker
- Raemer Schreiber – Physics pioneer who worked at Los Alamos during WWII
- Charlie Sitton – Former National Basketball Association (NBA) professional basketball player
- Will Vinton – Oscar-winning director and producer of animated films

== McMinnville UFO photographs ==
McMinnville is well known among UFO buffs and researchers for photographs originally published on the front page of the June 9, 1950 edition of the city's newspaper, the News-Register (then known as the Telephone-Register), reportedly of an unidentified flying object; the photographs were taken nearly a month earlier, on May 11, 1950, at the farm of Paul and Evelyn Trent. The Oregonian published the photographs the next day, and were published in the June 26, 1950 issue of LIFE magazine.

Although these images have come to be known as the "McMinnville UFO photographs", the Trent farm was actually located in Sheridan, Oregon, around thirteen miles (21 km) southwest of McMinnville. The heated debate which followed between UFO researchers and skeptics made the town's name famous and has spurred an annual "UFO Festival" in McMinnville, the second largest such gathering in the United States to that of Roswell, New Mexico.
