= Linfield University =

Private college in McMinnville, Oregon, US

- Former names: Baptist College of McMinnville (1858–1898); McMinnville College (1898–1922); Linfield College (1922–2020)
- Motto: Connecting Learning, Life and Community
- Type: Private liberal arts college
- Established: January 30, 1858; 168 years ago
- Religious affiliation: Historic and symbolic ties to American Baptist Churches USA
- Endowment: $128.4 million (2025)
- President: Mark Blegen
- Faculty: 130
- Administrative staff: 259
- Students: 1,726 (2023)
- Undergraduates: 1,672
- Postgraduates: 55
- Location: McMinnville, Oregon, U.S. 45°11′56.4″N 123°11′55.3″W
- Campus: Rural, 193 acres (78 ha) (McMinnville)
- Colors: Purple and cardinal
- Nickname: Wildcats
- Sporting affiliations: NCAA Division III
- Mascot: Mack the Wildcat
- Website: linfield.edu

Linfield University is a private liberal arts college with campuses in McMinnville, and Portland, Oregon. Linfield Wildcats athletics participate in the NCAA Division III Northwest Conference. Linfield reported a total of 1,755 students after the fall 2022 census date. The institution officially changed its name from Linfield College to Linfield University in 2020.

== History ==
=== The 1800s ===
Linfield traces its history back to the earliest days of Oregon Territory, when pioneer Baptists in Oregon City created the Oregon Baptist Educational Society in 1848. This society was organized to establish a Baptist school in the region, which began as Oregon City College in 1849. In 1855, Sebastian C. Adams began to agitate for a school in McMinnville. Adams and his associates were members of the Christian Church, and so the school became a Christian school. To begin, 6 acres (2.4 ha) of property were donated by W. T. Newby and a group was formed to establish the school. The group included William Dawson, James McBride, Newby, and Adams, and they bore the major part of the expenses of starting the school. These men built a building and convinced Adams, who was a teacher, to operate the school. After about a year and a half and because of the difficulty of running the school alone and funding problems, Adams suggested that the school be turned over to the Baptists who were attempting to start up the West Union Institute that had been chartered in 1858 by the Oregon Territorial Legislature. The Adams group imposed the condition that the Baptists keep at least one professor employed continuously in the college department. Other accounts indicate that the Baptist group purchased the land in 1857 in order to start their school. The Oregon Territorial Legislature chartered the Baptist College at McMinnville in 1858. The school later became McMinnville College in 1898.

=== The 1900s ===
In 1922, the name was changed to Linfield College in memory of a Baptist minister, the Rev. George Fisher Linfield whose widow, Frances Eleanor Ross Linfield, gave a substantial donation to the college to promote Christian education and as a memorial to her late husband. Mrs. Linfield served as Dean of Women from 1921 to 1928, and sat on the Board of Directors from 1922 to her death in 1940. Her gift included real estate in Spokane, Washington, valued at $250,000 (a sum worth nearly $4 million in 2020). Mrs. Linfield wanted to perpetuate memory of the name and influence of her late husband, George Fisher Linfield, as well as support Christian education.

In 1982, the Linfield-Good Samaritan School of Nursing was established when the college entered into an affiliation with Legacy Good Samaritan Hospital & Medical Center and began offering a bachelor's degree program in nursing.

=== The 2000s ===
Linfield offered buyouts to 13 professors in liberal-arts programs with shrinking enrollment in 2019, shortly after President Miles K. Davis arrived. He also announced efforts to shift resources to the nursing and business programs, which account for the majority of students. Those shifts led to strained relationships with some faculty members in the traditional liberals arts disciplines.

Following sexual abuse charges against a former trustee that involved students in 2017 and 2019, faculty members voted 88 to 18 on a motion of no confidence in David C. Baca, the chair of the college's board of trustees, in May 2020. The board continued to support Baca who offered to resign. Students then circulated a petition calling for Baca to step down from his position. An outside agency also investigated a claim made by a faculty member of "inappropriate touching" by two trustees.

The school officially changed its name to Linfield University in 2020. Along with the new name, Linfield unveiled a new logo and seal for the institution. The logo bears the letter "L" inside an acorn with oak leaves. According to the university, "Linfield has used an image of an acorn as part of its logo design since 2010, and a representation of an oak leaf in years previous to that."

In April 2021, President Miles K. Davis was accused by several faculty members of making antisemitic remarks. Davis denied the allegations in a letter to the Anti-Defamation League, which has suggested an investigation into the claims as well as antisemitism and bias training for institutional leaders. An earlier investigation into alleged remarks by Davis substantiated one allegation but was unable to confirm the other claims. One of the faculty members filed a complaint with the Oregon Bureau of Labor and Industries, claiming religious retaliation and harassment by Davis and Baca. On April 19, 2021, faculty members passed a resolution of no confidence in Davis and Baca, and called for their resignations. The college fired one of the whistleblowers, a Jewish tenured professor, Daniel Pollack-Pelzner, who filed a lawsuit against the school. Due in part to the termination of Pollack-Pelzner's employment, the American Association of University Professors (AAUP) censured Linfield for, in the AAUP's opinion, not respecting Pollack-Pelzner's academic freedom and not following institutional policies. In February, 2023, Linfield reached a $1 million settlement with the fired professor.

In September 2021, Baca stepped down as chair of the board of trustees.

In November, 2023, Davis announced his intention to resign in early 2024. Rebecca L. Johnson was appointed interim president on December 26, 2023. Mark Blegen became president effective July 1, 2025.

== Academics ==
Linfield University grants degrees at the baccalaureate and master's degree level. The institution offers 55 undergraduate majors, 48 minors, 5 graduate degrees and 8 certificate programs, in addition to pre-professional undergraduate programs in health, engineering, business, law and pre-medicine. These academic programs are housed in the College of Arts and Sciences, School of Business and the Linfield-Good Samaritan School of Nursing. Its three most popular majors, based on 2024 graduates, were nursing (291), exercise science and kinesiology (19), and psychology (18).

Linfield has a dual enrollment agreement with Portland Community College.

=== International education ===
Linfield offers several study abroad programs through its International Programs Office. Linfield covers the cost of round-trip airfare for a student's first international experience.

In 2019, Linfield began a five-year program with Ecole Superieure d’Agriculture (ESA) in Angers, France. Wine studies students spend three years at Linfield University and two years at ESA, earning a bachelor's degree in wine studies from Linfield and a master's degree in vine, wine, and terroir management from ESA.

In 2023, Linfield signed a memorandum of understanding with Sias University in Zhengzhou, China, which calls for the development of a joint-supervision dual degree program and mutual student exchanges.

=== Rankings ===
Several national ranking sites have recognized Linfield for the quality of its academic programs. Washington Monthly identifies Linfield as one of the top liberal arts colleges nationally, including it on its ranking lists from 2019–2024. Linfield has also been on Money Magazine's Best Colleges in America list in 2023 and 2024; named a Best College in the West by Princeton Review from 2020–2025; and among America's Top Colleges by Forbes Magazine in 2022 and 2023.

Linfield has been recognized for the social mobility of graduates. From 2022–2025, U.S. News & World Report ranked them No. 1 in Oregon for social mobility on its Top Performers on Social Mobility list. Washington Monthly named Linfield the No. 1 Liberal Arts College in Oregon for Earning Performance from 2020–2024, and in 2024, the publication named Linfield the No. 13 liberal arts college in the United States for earning performance. Linfield also ranked as a top liberal arts college in Washington and Oregon in Washington Monthly's "Best Bang for the Buck" list in 2016 and 2017, as well as from 2020–2024.

A 2015 study from The Economist ranked Linfield 27th nationally out of 1,275 colleges and universities when it came to the economic value of a degree. Also in 2015, Linfield was ranked among the best in the Pacific Northwest when it comes to admitting students from disadvantaged families and helping them move up the economic ladder. The study, "The Equality of Opportunity," was conducted by researchers from University of California, Berkeley, Stanford University, Brown University and the U.S. Department of the Treasury.

The diversity of Linfield's student body was recognized by Washington Monthly from 2017–2022, naming the institution on its "Best ethnic diversity among liberal arts colleges in the Pacific Northwest." Linfield has also been recognized for as the Best Liberal Arts College in Oregon for First-Generation Students by Washington Monthly in 2020.

Linfield University was included in the Foundation for Individual Rights in Education's annual list of "10 Worst Colleges for Free Speech" in 2022.

Linfield's efforts towards sustainability earned it a place on Princeton Review's "Guide to Green Colleges" list from 2010-2025.

Linfield's nursing and business programs have received national recognition for their excellence. U.S. News & World Report named Linfield's online business degree among its list of "Best Online Bachelor's in Business Programs" in 2025. The nursing program was ranked among the Best Undergraduate Nursing Programs in 2022–2024 by U.S. News & World Report.

The pet-friendly environment and policies of the McMinnville campus was recognized in College Magazine in 2023. The publication named Linfield the No. 6 Best College in the U.S. for Students Who Can't Imagine Life Without Animals. Specifically recognized were Linfield's pet-friendly residence hall and apartment.

In 2024, the Broadcast Education Association named Linfield the No. 1 university in the Pacific Northwest for student achievement in media.

== Campuses ==
=== McMinnville campus ===
Linfield's primary location in McMinnville, Oregon, moved to its present location in 1881. The original location was at 5th and C Street closer to downtown McMinnville. From a marker on the present campus: "...The board of Trustees met on August 2, 1881 and took action which resulted in moving (McMinnville) Linfield College from 5th & C streets to its present location, actuated by the gift of Mr. & Mrs. Samuel Cozine." Pioneer Hall, the oldest building at Linfield University, opened in 1883 and is listed on the National Register of Historic Places.

In the late 1990s, the institution acquired a former Hewlett-Packard property adjacent to the McMinnville campus, which more than doubled the size of the campus and opened new opportunities for the school.

The McMinnville campus currently sits at 189 acres and houses the College of Arts and Sciences and School of Business.

=== Portland campus ===
Linfield's presence in Portland, Oregon, began in 1982. In response to a national trend for nursing education to be a part of colleges and universities, the Good Samaritan Hospital School of Nursing became the Linfield-Good Samaritan School of Nursing under the auspices of Linfield College.

Founded by Emily Loveridge in 1890, the Good Samaritan Hospital Diploma School of Nursing was the first school of nursing in the Northwest. Loveridge served Good Samaritan Hospital for 40 years and is considered a pioneer in nursing. With this history, the Linfield School of Nursing remains the longest running nursing school in the Northwest.

The original campus for the Linfield-Good Samaritan School of Nursing was adjacent to the Legacy Good Samaritan Hospital and Medical Center in Northwest Portland. In February 2021, Linfield opened a 20-acre campus in northeast Portland, acquired from the University of Western States, to house its nursing school.

In honor of Good Samaritan nursing school founder Emily Loveridge, Linfield dedicated a building on its campus as Loveridge Hall in September 2024. The building houses a historical exhibit honoring Loveridge and her nursing legacy in the Pacific Northwest.

=== eCampus ===
Linfield's eCampus is the online home for the Online and Continuing Education program. It originated in 1975 as the Division of Continuing Education (an Adult Degree Program), and the programs moved online in the 1990s. Linfield offers undergraduate majors, endorsements and certificates online, as well as graduate level endorsements.

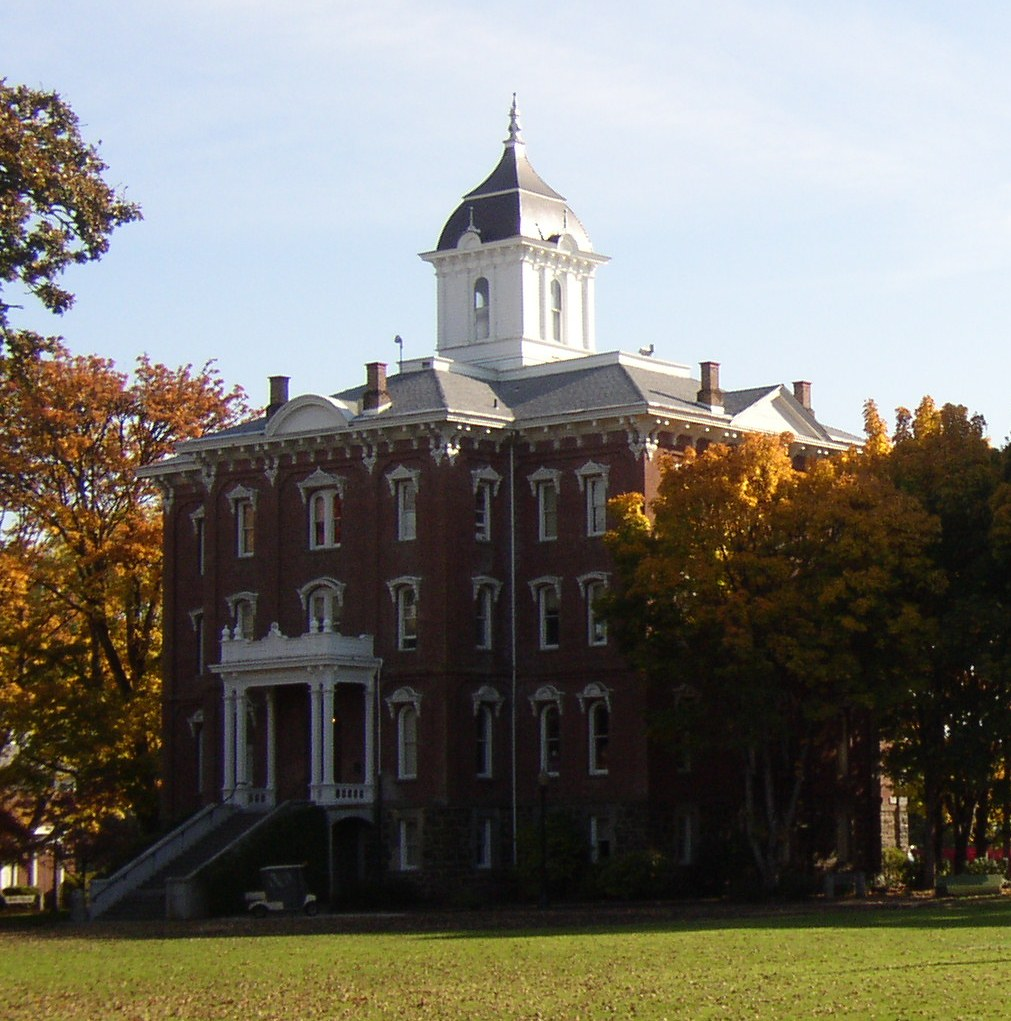
Pioneer Hall, built in 1882

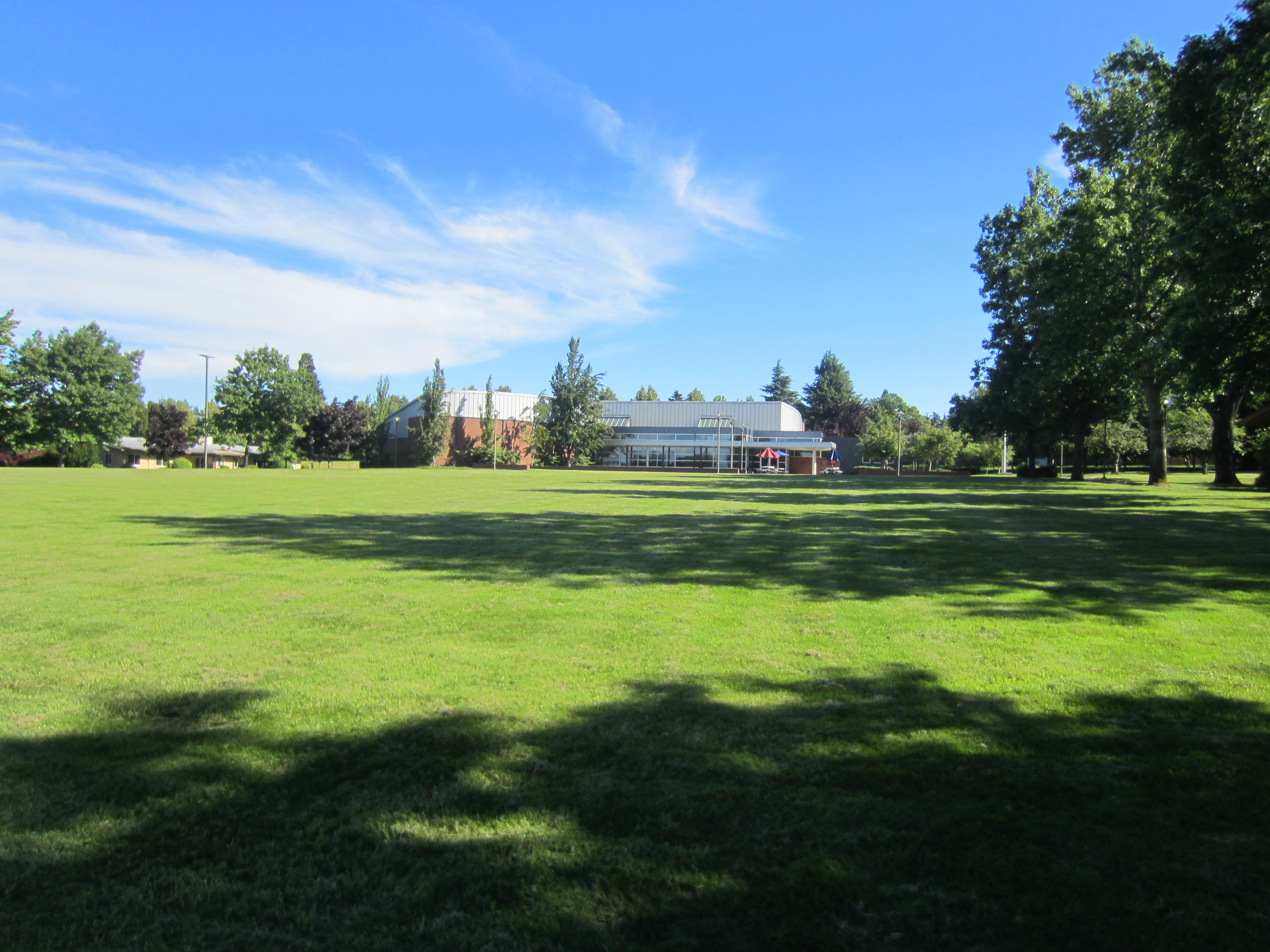
The Portland Campus started holding classes in Northwest Portland in February 2021

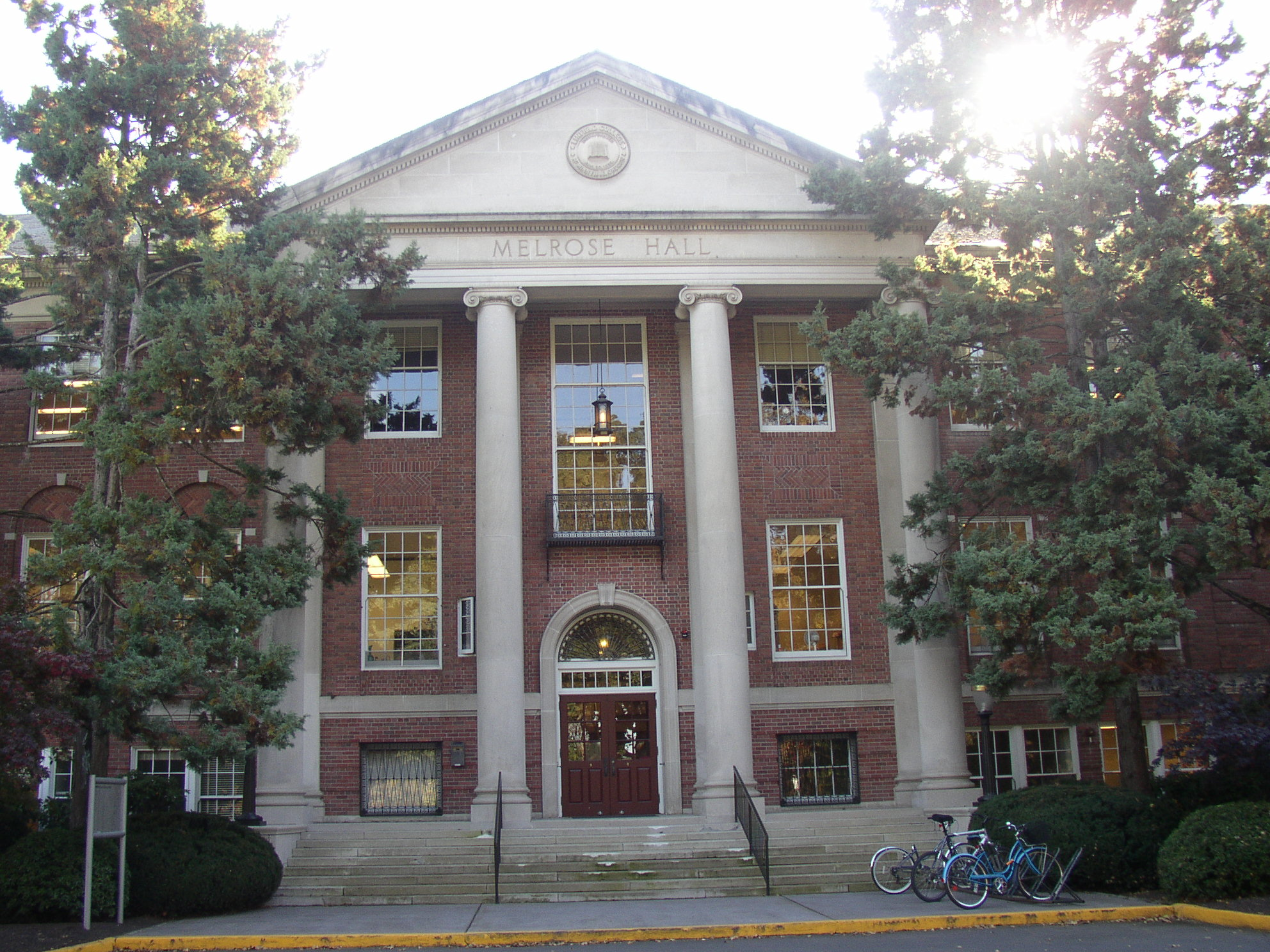
Melrose Hall, built in 1929, is the administrative center of the institution

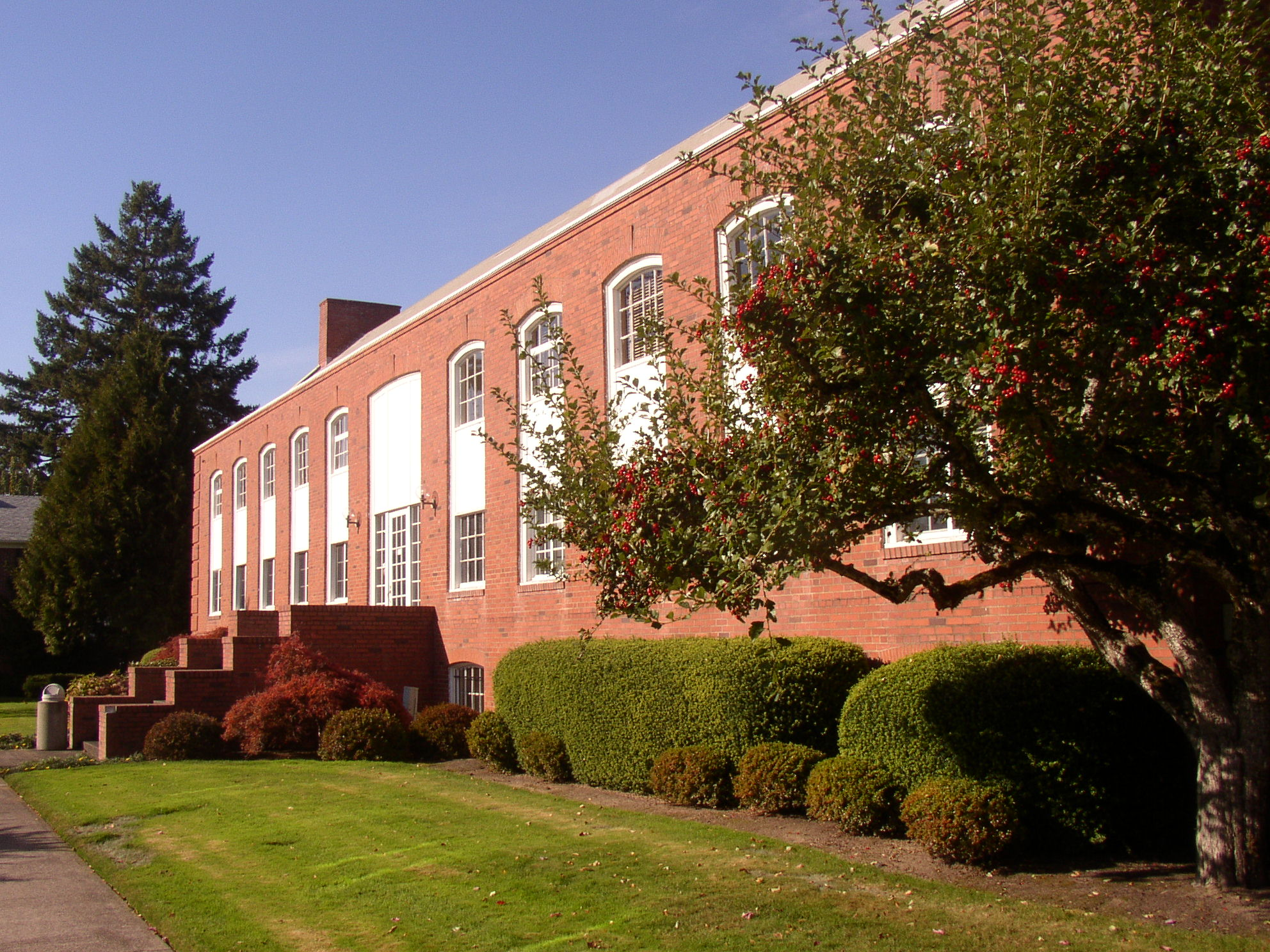
T.J. Day Hall (formerly Northup Hall), built in 1936, was the library through 2003

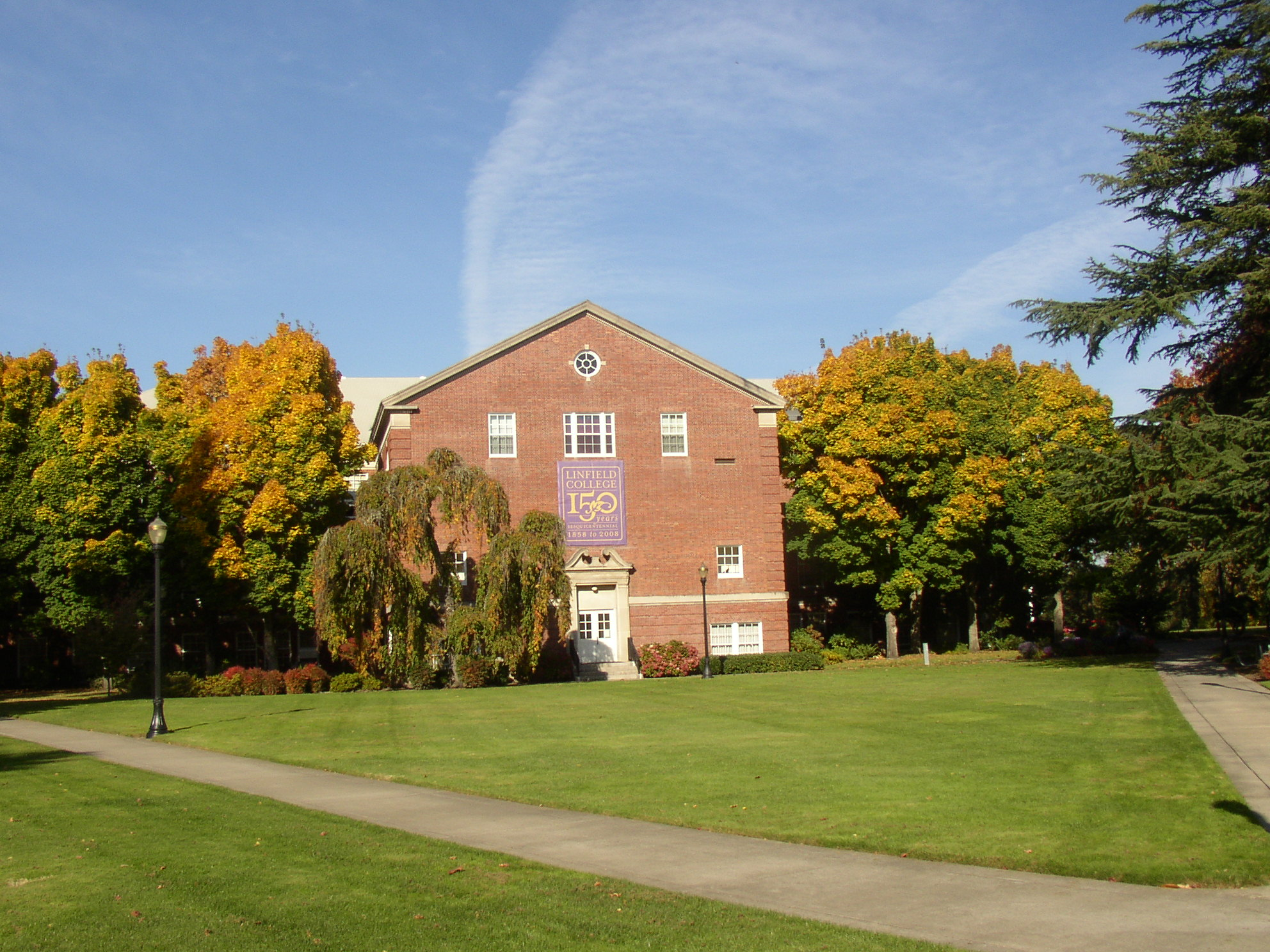
Melrose Hall from the academic quad

== Accreditation ==
Linfield University is institutionally accredited by the Northwest Commission on Colleges and Universities. Specialized accreditation is granted to individual programs. The Linfield-Good Samaritan School of Nursing is accredited by the Oregon State Board of Nursing and the Commission on Collegiate Nursing Education. The education program is approved for training of education and secondary teachers by the State of Oregon's Teachers Standards and Practices Commission. Linfield University's music program is accredited by the National Association of Schools of Music, and its athletic training program is accredited by the Commission on Accreditation of Athletic Training Education.

== Athletics ==
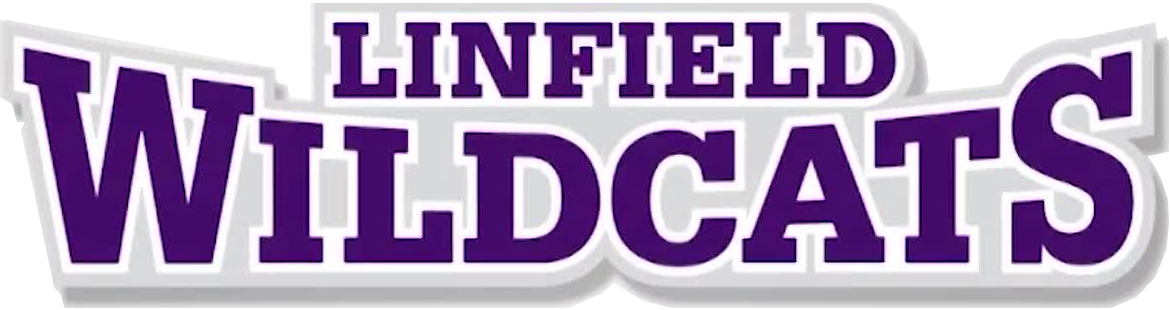
Linfield athletics wordmark

Linfield offers varsity sports in baseball, men's basketball, women's basketball, cross-country, football, men's golf, women's golf, women's lacrosse, women's soccer, men's soccer, softball, swimming, women's tennis, men's tennis, track and field, women's volleyball, men's wrestling, and women's wrestling.

Linfield also offers thirteen intramural sports opportunities.

== Student life ==
Linfield University offers over 40 organizations on campus and over 300 leadership positions. The Associated Students of Linfield University (ASLU) or the Wildcat Entertainment Board (WEB) sponsor all clubs and student-led activities.

=== Campus media ===
==== The Linfield Review ====
The Linfield Review is Linfield's student-run weekly campus newspaper. The newspaper is staffed only by students of the college and funded mostly through the Associated Students of Linfield University. According to the March 16, 2007, issue of the newspaper, the Linfield Review took third place in the Best in Show contest at the Associated Collegiate Press national college newspaper convention in Portland. In 2021, the publication received 10 awards from the Pacific Northwest Association of Journalism Educators for its website and individual pieces of content by the student staff. Outgoing editor Maddie Loverich was received the 2021 Region 10 Mark of Excellence Award for sports writing (small division) for her article, "Freshman makes big impact for Linfield softball."

==== Linfield Pawdcast Network ====
This student-run club promotes the creation, production and recording of original podcasts by Linfield students and employees. The Linfield Pawdcat Network is run out of the Student Media Center in Renshaw Hall, the location of the former student-run radio station, 90.3 KSLC. Linfield offered its first podcasting class as part of its Department of Journalism and Media Studies in spring 2021. Kendall Harrison and Nathaly Sanchez received honorable mentions in the NPR Podcast Challenge in April 2021. In 2023, Mackenzie Kulick had a podcast episode place third in the "Specialty Program and Podcasts" category of the Broadcast Educators Association's Festival of Media Arts' Student Audio Competition.

=== Greek organizations ===
As of 2021, there are three fraternities and four sororities at Linfield University.

== Events ==
=== Camas Festival ===
The annual Camas Festival started in 2021 and is held during the first weekend of May. Linfield started the festival in partnership with the Confederated Tribes of Grand Ronde and the Yamhill Watershed Council to celebrate camas, or camassia plant, which was once prolific in the region and a prolific food source for the local tribes. Linfield's McMinnville campus has a patch of camas growing on it that faculty and students have restored.

=== NW Media Fest ===
NW Media Fest is a multiple-day event featuring guests from across the media and entertainment industry, which started in 2022. Guests have included chef Susan Feniger, Pulitzer prize-winning journalist Steve Kurkjian, photographer Joey Terrill, Warner Brothers Discovery executive Peter Clem, Dark Horse Comics CEO and founder Mike Richardson, and filmmaker and composer Liz Lachman.

=== Oregon Nobel Laureate Symposium ===
Former Linfield President Charles Walker secured several grants in 1981 to endow a permanent endowment fund dedicated to bringing Nobel laureates to McMinnville. The symposium evolved out of a lecture series organized by Bill Apel, then the campus chaplain and religious studies professor, who had coordinated smaller events on the topic of world peace. Apel organized the Oregon Nobel Laureate Symposium from 1986-1991, when it stopped being an annual event. Past Nobel Prize winners who have spoken at the symposium include Elie Wiesel in 1988, Franco Modigliani in 1989, Oscar Arias in 1998, Jose Ramos-Horta in 2000, and Harold Kroto in 2011. After a 10-year hiatus, the Oregon Nobel Laureate Symposium returned in 2023 featuring Nobel Prize for physics winners William D. Phillips and David J. Wineland.

=== Community events at Linfield ===
In addition to the institution-organized events, Linfield University is home to multiple other community events held throughout the year. This includes:

- International Pinot Noir Celebration is held in late July. Started in 1987, the event is a three-day celebration of Pinot Noir and its winemakers.
- Les Schwab Bowl, Oregon's all-star high school football game, is held during the summer at Memorial Stadium.
- Mente Summit is organized by nonprofit Mente, which promotes higher education for Latinx men. The event features workshops and a college fair. At the close of the summit, 20 students are awarded with $1,000 scholarships.

== Notable people ==
Notable Linfield people

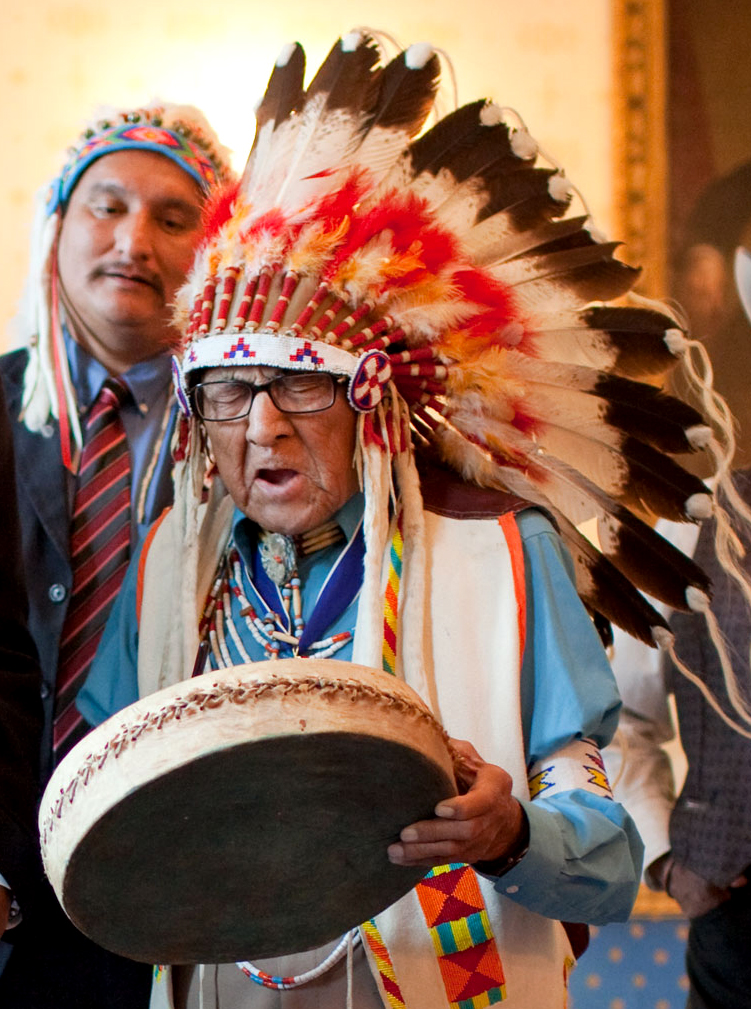
Joe Medicine Crow, Crow historian, last surviving Plains Indian war chief, and WWII veteran who received the Presidential Medal of Freedom

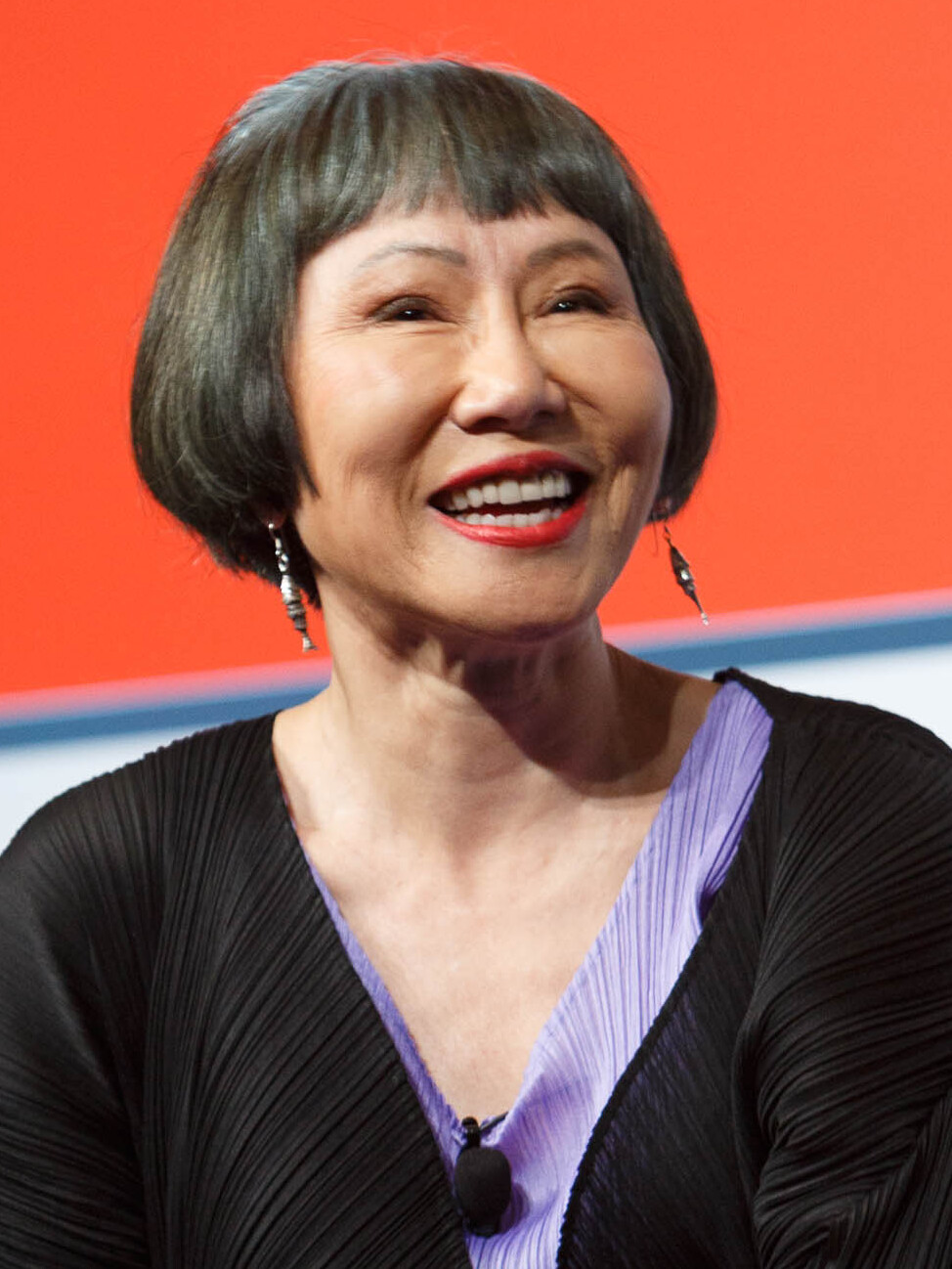
Amy Tan, author of The Joy Luck Club, The Bonesetter's Daughter, and The Kitchen God's Wife

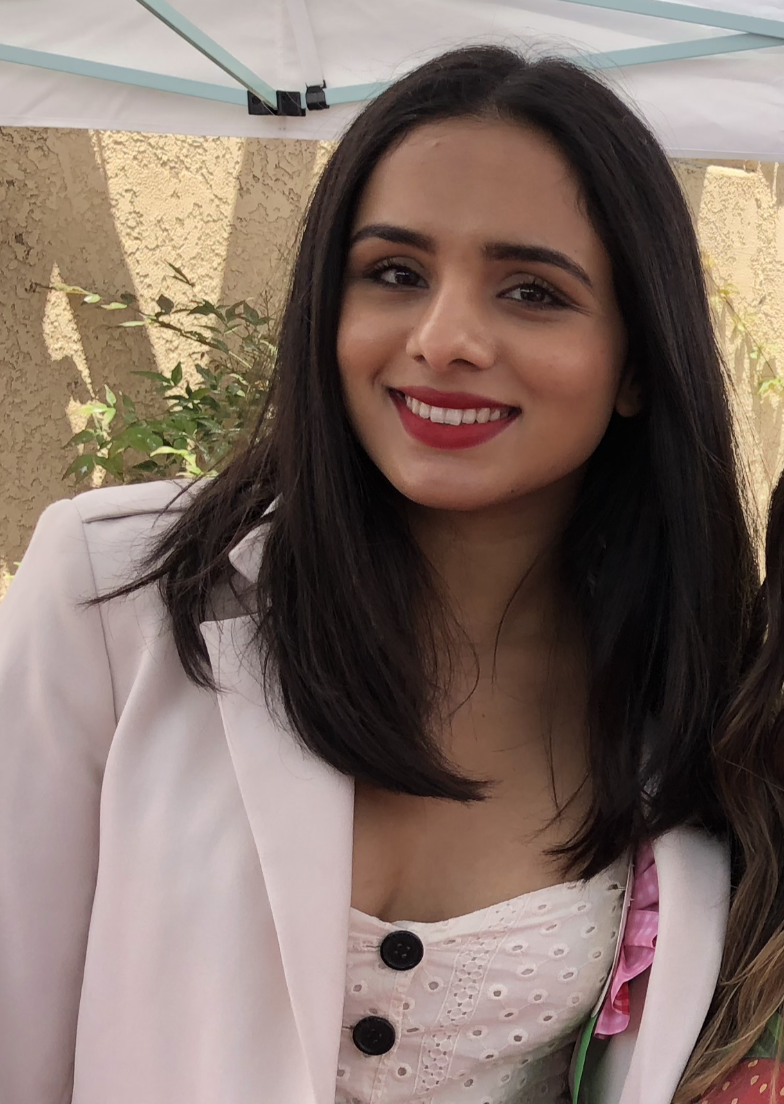
Aparna Brielle, actress known for role on A.P. Bio

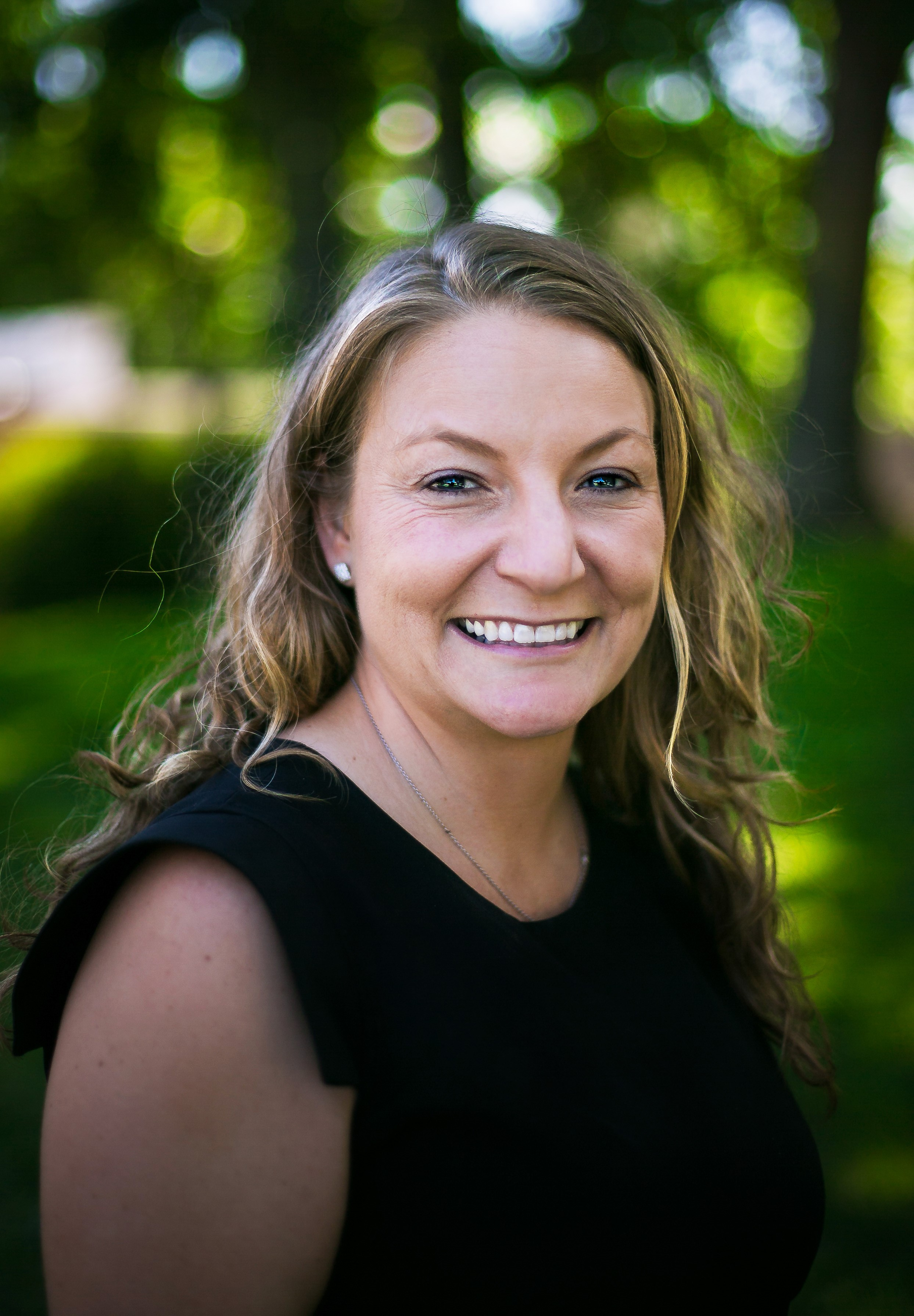
Jessica (Saling) Gill, leading researcher on traumatic brain injuries and professor at Johns Hopkins School of Medicine

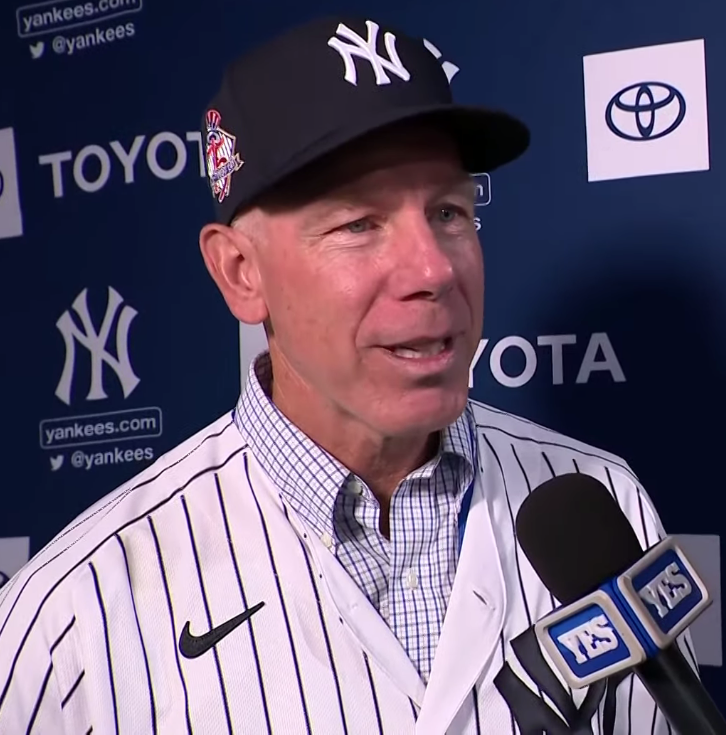
Scott Brosius, professional baseball player and coach

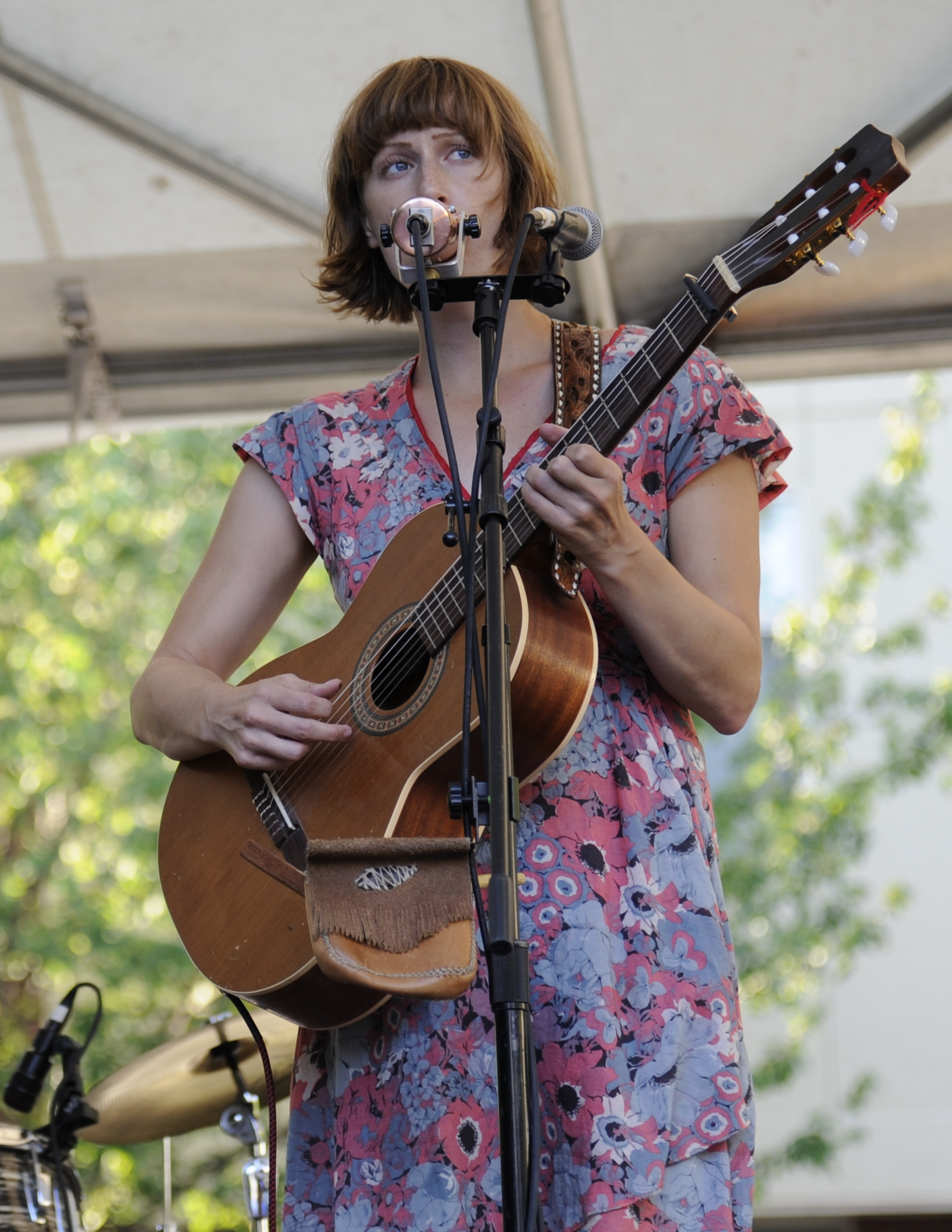
Laura Gibson, musician

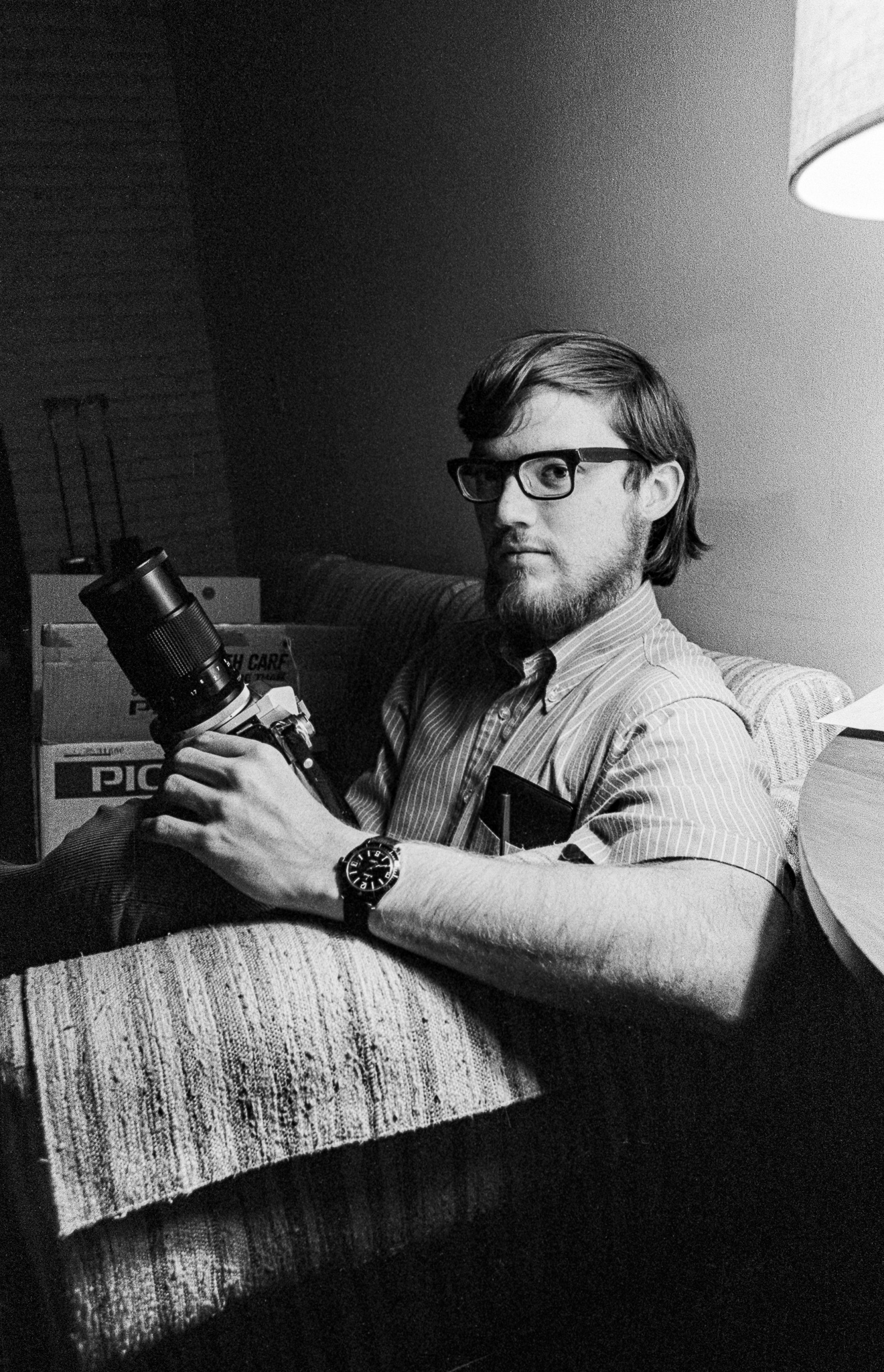
Reid Blackburn, American photographer killed in the 1980 eruption of Mount St. Helens

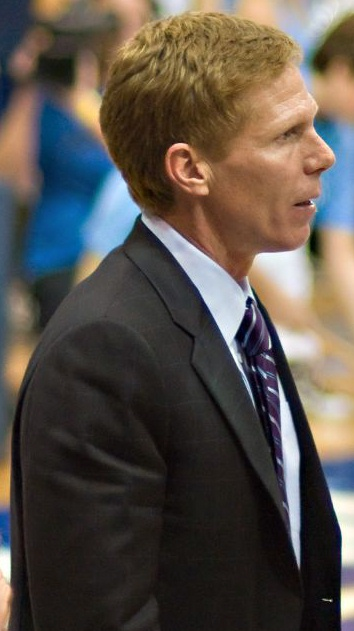
Mark Few, head basketball coach at Gonzaga University

Notable graduates of Linfield University include Scott Brosius, former New York Yankee and 1998 World Series MVP; Kenneth Scott Latourette, scholar of Christianity and Chinese History; Douglas Robinson, translation theorist; First Lieutenant Rex T. Barber, pilot in Operation Vengeance; actress Aparna Brielle; and Joe Medicine Crow, Native American historian and the only Linfield University graduate to receive the Presidential Medal of Freedom.

Among those who attended but did not graduate from Linfield are Amy Tan, the award-winning author of The Joy Luck Club, The Bonesetter's Daughter, and The Kitchen God's Wife; and Mark Few, head basketball coach at Gonzaga University since 1999.

== In popular culture ==
Linfield University's campus has been used for filming video and print commercials, short films and major productions.

- The McMinnville campus was used to shoot scenes for A Haunting at Silver Falls: The Return (2019)
- Actress Demi Moore wore a Linfield Wildcat tank top in Indecent Proposal (1993)
- Linfield Revisted (1973) is a 16mm color short from Homer Groening
