= UFO photographs =

Photographs of unidentified flying objects

Since the 1940s, media has covered purported photographs of Unidentified Flying Objects (UFOs). Numerous examples have been determined to be hoaxes.

Professor Branden W. Joseph has argued that there are "a substantial enough collection of photographs of unidentified flying objects (UFOs) that one can begin to discern a distinct pictorial genre: The UFO photograph". Joseph describes the typical UFO photograph as "portraying a blurry, saucer-like form, with just enough horizon to indicate airborne trajectory, but not enough to allow definitive judgement of scale." Writes Joseph: "Although often explained as a result of the fantastic speeds or unusual composition of flying saucers, both lack of focus and ambiguity of scale are conducive to manipulation, whether in alteration of the print or negative or the reproduction of a scale model or other small, disc-shaped object." UFO photography has been featured in the artwork of Mike Kelley and Tony Oursler.

== Early examples ==
=== Flying disc craze (1947) ===
External images
- Frank Ryman photograph
- Albert Weaver photograph

On July 4, it was reported that Frank Ryman, a Coast Guard yeoman in Seattle, had photographed a flying disc. July 8 saw the publication of a photograph by Albert Weaver of Pontiac of what he said were two flying discs. Weaver reported that the discs were each about two feet in diameter.

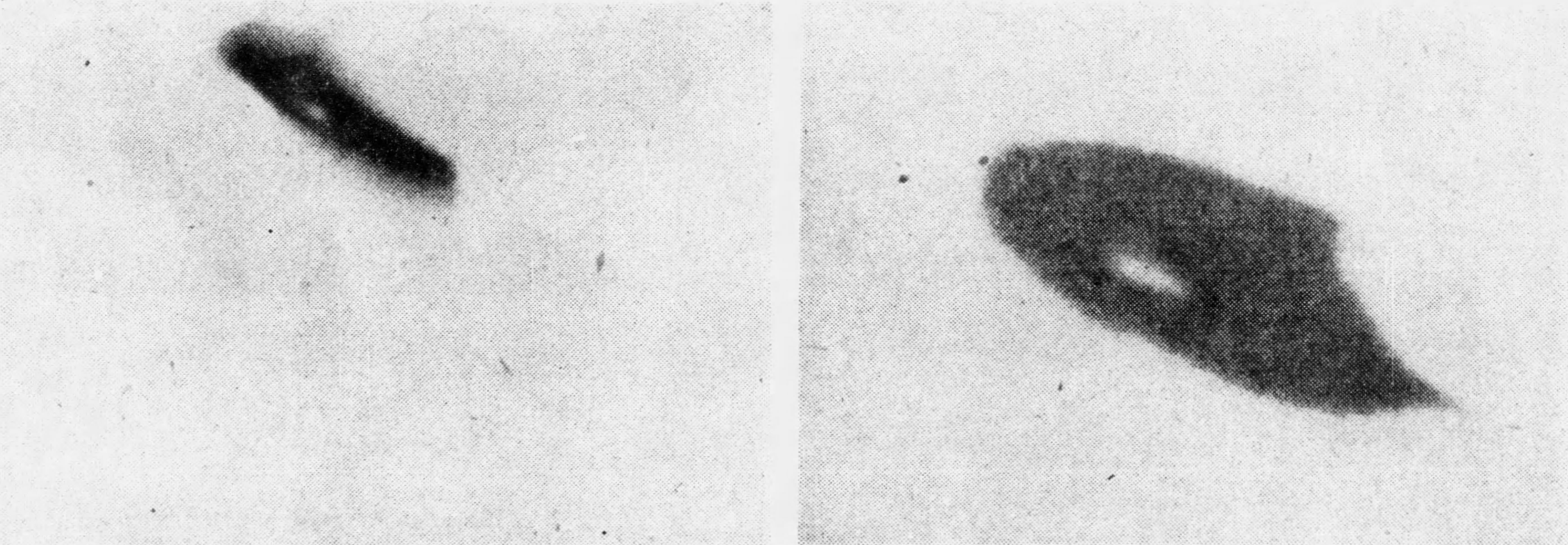
The Rhodes UFO photographs

The Rhodes UFO photographs, sometimes called the shoe-heel UFO photographs, purport to show a disc-like object flying above Phoenix, Arizona, United States. The two photographs were reportedly taken on July 7, 1947, by amateur astronomer and inventor William Albert Rhodes. They were printed in the newspaper The Arizona Republic on July 9, along with Rhodes's account of his sighting of the object.

=== McMinnville (1950) ===
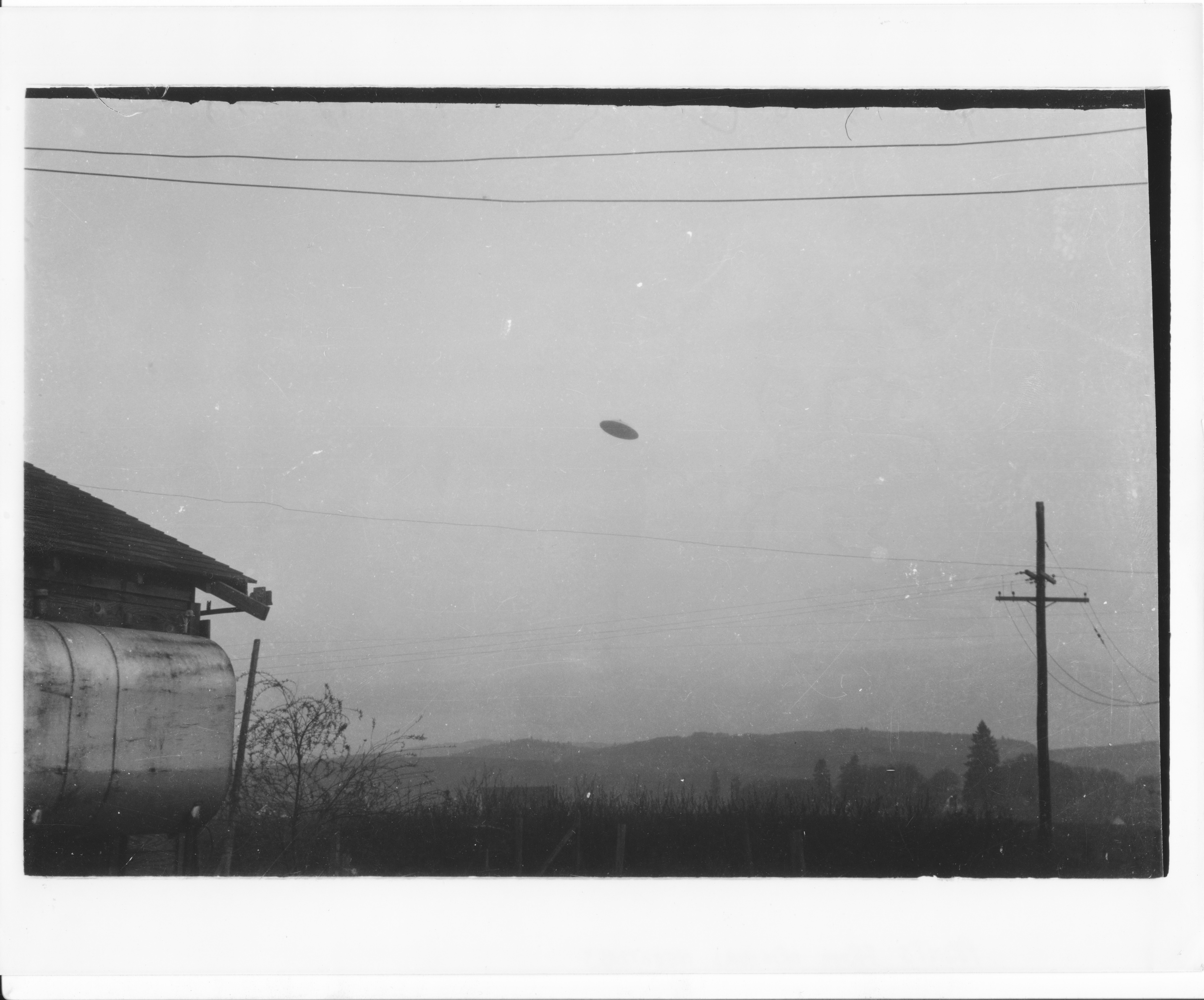
One of the McMinnville photos, sometimes called the "Trent" photos

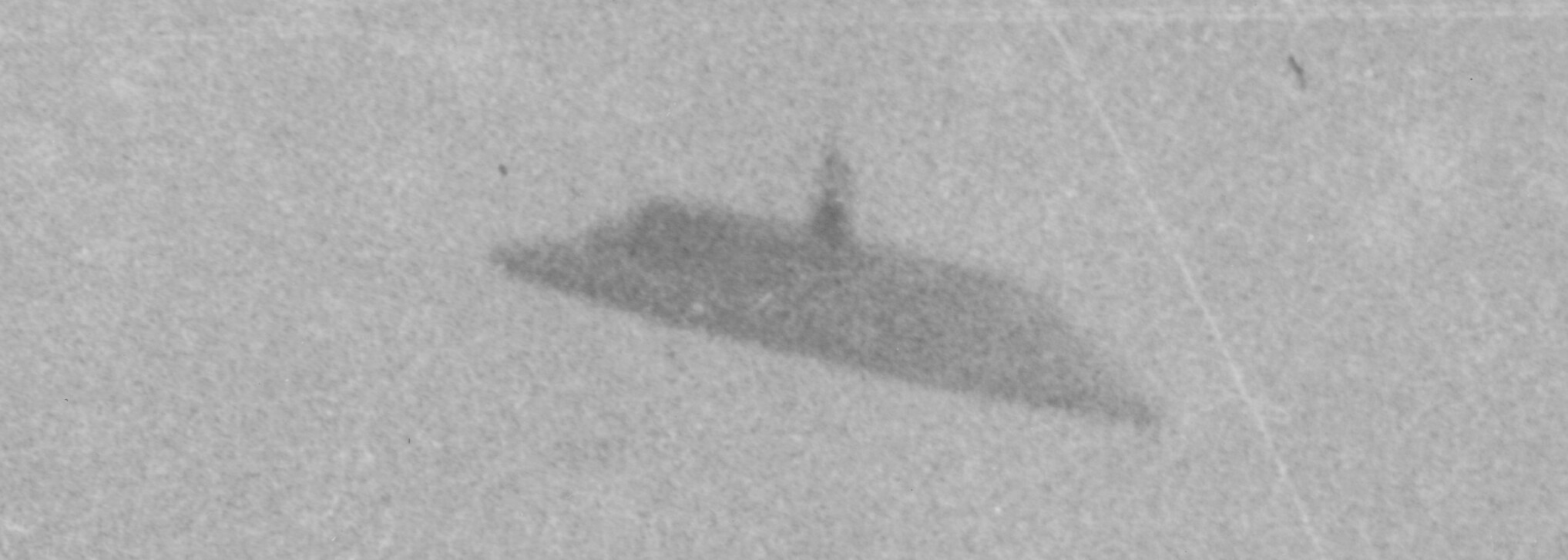
Close-up of McMinnville UFO photo, which some suspect may show an automobile side mirror.

On June 8, 1950, press published the McMinnville UFO photographs, which reportedly depicted a flying saucer over a farm about 13 miles from McMinnville, Oregon. The photos were reprinted in Life magazine and in newspapers across the nation, and are often considered to be among the most iconic UFO photos. UFO skeptics have concluded that the photos are most likely a hoax, but many ufologists continue to argue that the photos are real and depict a genuine, unidentified flying object. Later analysis of the photos indicated that the object photographed was small and likely a model hanging from power lines visible at the top of the photos. They also believed the object may have been an detached side-view mirror of a vehicle. The object has a shape that is very similar to the round mirrors that were used on Ford vehicles for decades, or similar models on almost all vehicles of the era.

=== Mariana film (1950) ===
A segment from the 1956 film UFO, which includes footage of the incident, testimony from Nick Mariana, and an analysis by Robert M.L. Baker

The Mariana UFO incident occurred in August, 1950 in Great Falls, Montana. The sighting, filmed by local baseball coach Nick Mariana, is believed to be among the first ever motion picture footage of what came to be called an unidentified flying object (UFO). The U.S. Air Force, after a short investigation, concluded that what Mariana had actually filmed were the reflections of two F-94 jet fighters, a claim that the Air Force would later retract.

=== Lubbock Lights (1951) ===
Lights over Lubbock, Texas were first reported by three professors from Texas Technological College on August 25, 1951, at around 9 pm. According to Edward J. Ruppelt, they were sitting in the backyard of one of the professor's homes when they observed a total of 20-30 lights, as bright as stars but larger in size, flying overhead. Ruppelt wrote that the professors immediately ruled out meteors as a possible cause for the sightings, and as they discussed their sighting a second, similar, group of lights flew overhead. On the evening of August 30, 1951, Carl Hart, Jr., a freshman at Texas Tech, observed a group of 18-20 white lights in a "v" formation flying overhead. Hart took a 35-mm Kodak camera and walked to the backyard of his parents’ home to see if the lights would return. Two more lights passed overhead, and Hart captured five photos before they disappeared. The photographs were soon reprinted in newspapers around the nation and in Life magazine.

=== Passaic (1952) ===
The Passaic photographs are a set of photographs purportedly taken in Passaic, New Jersey by George Stock on July 31, 1952. Allegedly depicting a domed flying saucer, the images were widely published in contemporary media. A witness recalled that the object was heading southeast as a "leisurely pace" before coming to a halt and hovering overhead, saying "It was so near, it could have been hit with a rifle". He described the object as 30 feet (9.1 m) wide and estimated it was hovering at 200 feet (61 m). He described the object as silent. Riley claimed the object tilted as it began moving towards the southwest, ultimately travelling out of sight. Ufologist Kevin D. Randle called the Passaic photos the "most spectacular" of the 1952 flap but characterized them as a hoax.

=== Contactee hoaxes ===
In the 1950s, George Adamski and his followers claimed to have been contacted by Nordic "space brothers" from Venus. In 1952, Adamski provided a photograph he claimed was a spaceship from Venus. His frequently published photo depicts an object which has been variously identified as the top of a chicken brooder or a streetlight. In his 1955 investigation into Adamski's claims, James W. Moseley interviewed German rocket scientist Walther Johannes Riedel, who told him that he had analyzed Adamski's UFO photos and found them to be fakes. Riedel told Moseley that the UFO's "landing struts" were actually 100-watt General Electric light bulbs, and that he had seen the round "GE" logo printed on them. In 2012, UFO researcher Joel Carpenter identified the reflector-shade of a widely available 1930s pressurized-gas lantern as an identical visual match to the main portion of Adamski's saucer.

Adamski disciple Howard Menger similarly publicized a picture reportedly showing a Venusian ship with the silhouette of a space visitor. Menger's photograph was widely believed to be a hoax, even by believers in UFOs.

Joseph likens the "contactee" photos to the earlier genre of spirit photography, noting that like the female spirit mediums, contactees were "vaulted beyond the confines of their class and standing".

== Late 20th century examples ==
=== Heflin (1965) ===
On August 3, 1965, at about 12:30 p.m, Rex Heflin, a highway maintenance employee for Orange County, was on Myford Road, near the Marine Corps Air Station El Toro when he reportedly witnessed a UFO. Heflin reportedly snapped a series of photos of the object, which resembled a metallic straw hat. Heflin assumed the object was an experimental aircraft from the military base. The photographs were published in a local newspaper on September 20 and nationwide soon afterward. Heflin estimated the object was 30 feet in diameter; he also saw a rotating beam of light on the underside of the craft. The following week, the Air Force dismissed the photos as a hoax.

=== Lake Cote (1971) ===
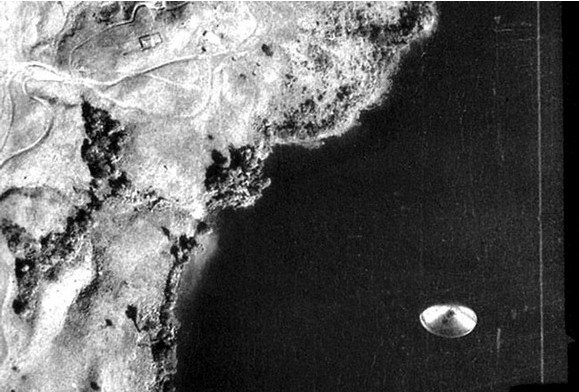
Cote UFO, 1971

On 4 September 1971, during an aerial survey by the National Geographic Institute of Costa Rica, what looks like a UFO was photographed over Lake Cote.

=== Billy Meier hoaxes (1970s) ===
In the mid-1970s, Billy Meier 's hoax photographs and films were claimed by him to show alien spacecraft floating above the Swiss countryside. He calls the alleged spaceships "beamships" from Plejaren. According to Meier, the Plejaren gave him permission to photograph and film their beamships so that he could produce evidence of their extraterrestrial visitations. Some of Meier's photos are claimed by him to show prehistoric Earth scenes, extraterrestrials, and celestial objects from an alleged non-Earthly vantage point. Meier's claims are widely characterized as fraudulent by scientists, skeptics, and most ufologists, who say that his photographs and films are hoaxes. In interviews with author Gary Kinder, Meier admitted to using models to recreate scenes after his wife showed photos of incomplete models he thought he had destroyed by burning.

=== Hudson Valley (1984) ===
The Hudson Valley UFO pictures also called "The Westchester Boomerang", were UFO sightings that stretched throughout 1983–1984 in New York and Western Connecticut. Law enforcement located the cause of the lights: Pilots flew Cessna 152s in tight formation with bright lights that could change colors. State police reported that the pilots expressed amusement at the confusion caused by their hoax.

=== Belgian hoax (1990) ===
In April 1990, a photo of a black triangular object with three lights at its corners was released by an anonymous photographer. Released at the height of the wave, the photo was widely seen in newspapers and other sources, known as the "Petit-Rechain photo". The photograph was examined by a number of sources, including NASA, the French National Centre for Scientific Research and the Belgian Royal Military Academy, but none could positively identify it or find obvious signs of fakery. There were concerns about its authenticity due to the anonymous release, but these were argued away. For 20 years, the UFOlogical organization Société belge d'étude des phénomènes spatiaux (SOBEPS) claimed that this picture was genuine, while others like Les repas ufologiques parisiens were not sure.

On 26 July 2011, in an interview for the Belgian TV channel RTL, Patrick Maréchal explained that it was a hoax that he had constructed to fool with his workmates.

=== Calvine (1990) ===
The Calvine photograph was a reported UFO near the hamlet of Calvine in Perthshire, Scotland in August 1990. The sighting was originally reported to the Daily Record, a Glasgow-based tabloid newspaper, by two men who claimed that they witnessed an unknown diamond-shaped craft while walking on the moors above Calvine on the evening of 4 August 1990. They reported seeking shelter under some nearby trees from where they watched the craft, taking photographs while it hovered silently above before ascending vertically and disappearing from view. The two witnesses later told their story to the Daily Record and handed over their prints and original negatives, which were later passed on to the Ministry of Defence (MOD). The original negatives and prints subsequently disappeared and the story was never published by the Daily Record. The identity of the witnesses remains unknown despite efforts to locate them by a team of researchers led by investigative journalist David Clarke.

In the following years, reports of the sighting and rumours of the photograph gradually surfaced, and the case slowly gained public interest. Partial documentation included in Ministry of Defence documents released by The National Archives in 2009 helped provide further insight into the sighting and attracted more attention. This ultimately led to the discovery of an original photographic image of the UFO by Clarke, which was subsequently published in the British-based tabloid newspaper the Daily Mail on Saturday 13 August 2022, with an online release the night before. The publication of the image led to significant media coverage which has been maintained through subsequent stories, with news outlets leading their coverage with often sensational headlines describing the Calvine photograph as "the best UFO picture ever" (2022), the "best ever photo evidence" (2023), the "World's clearest UFO photo" (2024), and "the best UFO photograph ever seen" (2025).

=== Phoenix Lights (1997) ===
External videos
- Video of Phoenix Lights

During the Phoenix lights, numerous still photographs and videotapes were made showing a series of lights appearing at a regular interval, remaining illuminated for several moments, and then going out. The images were later determined to be the result of mountains not visible by night that partially obstructed the view of aircraft flares from certain angles to create the illusion of an arc of lights appearing and disappearing one by one.

== Modern examples ==
=== The "CARET Drones" ===
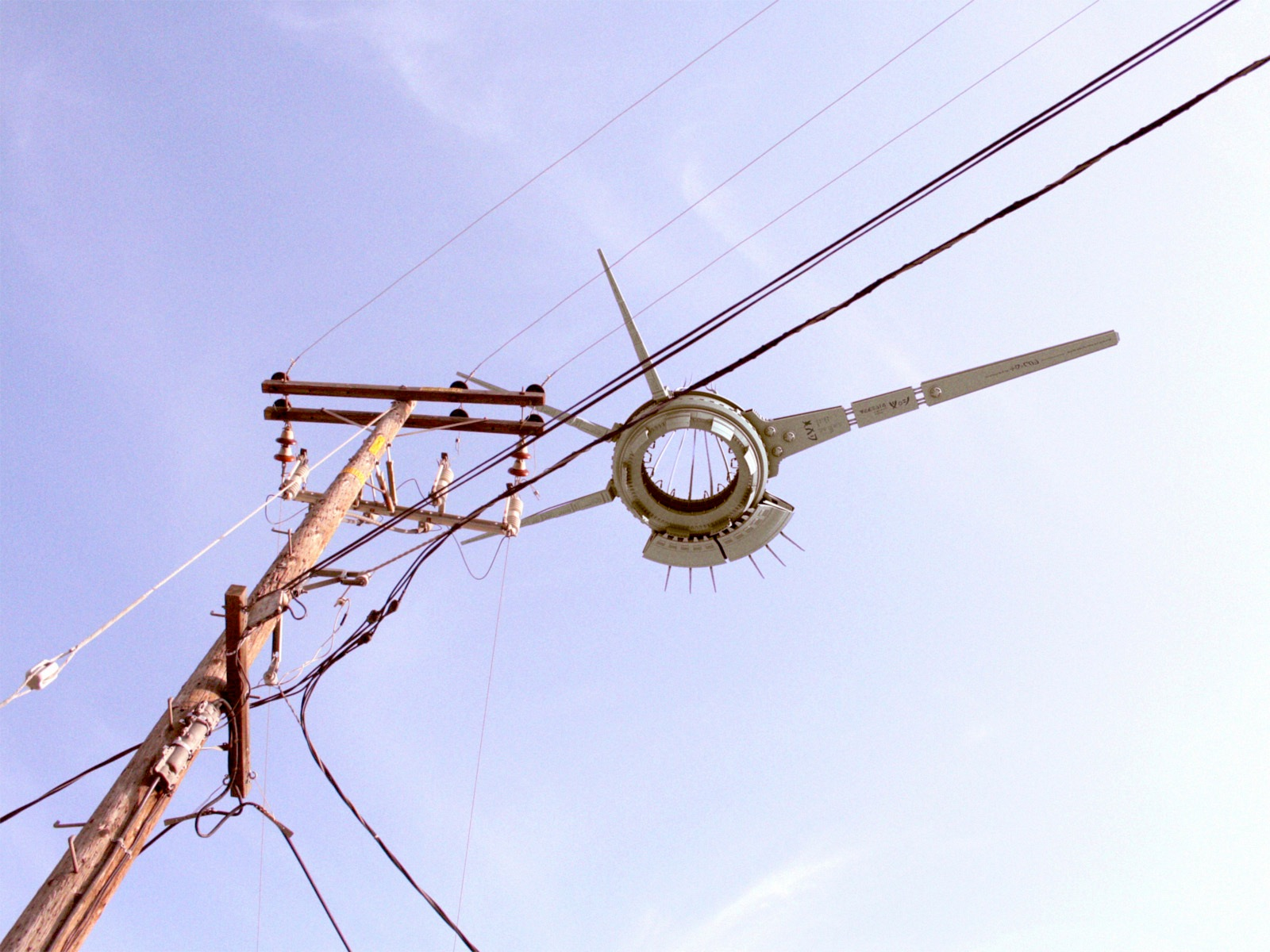
A photograph of one of the supposed "CARET drones" which were allegedly seen across California and Nevada in 2007.

In mid-2007, there were multiple sightings of small, unmanned "drones" (dubbed "dragonfly drones" by some on the Internet) by various people residing in California and Nevada. The craft all appeared to be metallic rings with one or more "arms" protruding from them and spiky "hair" that would point upward from the middle. On the various crafts, there appeared to be strange lettering similar to the "Katakana" font but not an exact match. There were five "official" sightings across California and Nevada, all with clear, accompanying photographs and testimony from each of the witnesses, all of whom remained anonymous. The sightings all culminated in the alleged "disclosure" of "top secret documents" from a whistleblower claiming to be part of a top secret organization located in Palo Alto, California called "CARET", which allegedly stood for "Commercial Application Research for Extraterrestrial Technology". The documents contained an "alien language primer" for the "glyphs" seen on the drones in the photos and explained the supposed origins of the drones and their capabilities.

Writer/artist Margaret Gel claimed she was the creator of the "alien language" seen in the documents and on the drones themselves. In addition, she claimed the drones were CG objects created by fellow artists she knew online before her language and the drone designs were stolen by the person who first released the photos and the primer. She did not name the person who allegedly stole her work, saying she feared she would be sued if she did so.

=== Nimitz (2004) ===
"FLIR" video, Nov 2004, recorded by Lt. Commander Chad Underwood of the USS Nimitz off the coast of southern California

On November 14, 2004, fighter pilot Commander David Fravor of the USS Nimitz Carrier Strike Group investigated radar indications of a possible target off the coast of southern California. Fravor said the operator had told him that the USS Princeton (CG-59), part of the strike group, had been tracking unusual aircraft for two weeks prior to the incident. The aircraft would appear at 80,000 feet (24,000 m) before descending rapidly toward the sea, and stopping at 20,000 feet (6,100 m) and hovering. Fravor reported that he saw an object, white and oval, hovering above an ocean disturbance. He estimated that the object was about 40 feet (12 m) long. Fravor and another pilot, Alex Dietrich, said in an interview that a total of four people (two pilots and two weapons systems officers in the back seats of the two airplanes) witnessed the object for about 5 minutes. Fravor says that as he spiraled down to get closer to the object, the object ascended, mirroring the trajectory of his airplane, until the object disappeared.

A second wave of fighters, which included weapons systems officer Lieutenant Commander Chad Underwood, took off from Nimitz to investigate. Unlike Fravor, Underwood's fighter was equipped with an advanced infrared camera (FLIR). Underwood recorded the FLIR video, and coined the description "Tic Tac" to describe the infrared image; Underwood later explained that the term was partially inspired by a joke in the 1980 comedy Airplane!. Underwood did not observe the object with his own eyes, saying:

"I was more concerned with tracking it, making sure that the videotape was on so that I could bring something back to the ship, so that the intel folks could dissect whatever it is that I captured."

=== Roosevelt (2015) ===
"GIMBAL" video, Jan 2015, recorded by crew of the USS Theodore Roosevelt off the US east coast

During 2014–2015, fighter pilots associated with the USS Theodore Roosevelt carrier strike group were operating off the East Coast of the United States when they recorded the GIMBAL and GOFAST videos while reporting instrument detections of unknown aerial objects which the pilots were unable to identify.

=== Russell (2019) ===
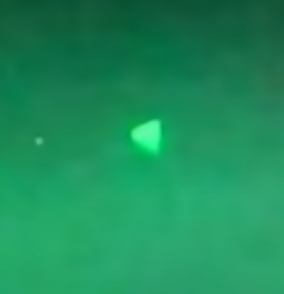
Still from the USS Russell video

In April 2021, Pentagon spokesperson Sue Gough confirmed that publicly-available video footage of what appeared to be an unidentified triangular object in the sky had been taken by Navy personnel aboard USS Russell in 2019. Science writer and skeptical investigator Mick West suggested the image was the result of an optical effect called a bokeh, which can make out of focus light sources appear triangular or pyramidal due to the shape of the aperture of some camera lenses.

== See also ==
- Alien Autopsy hoax film
- All-Domain Anomaly Resolution Office
- Loch Ness Monster photographs
- Patterson–Gimlin "Bigfoot" film
- Spirit photography
