= Deep Prasad =

Canadian businessman and UFO enthusiast

Deeptanshu Prasad
- Born: India
- Other name: Deep
- Education: University of Toronto; BASc, Industrial engineering (2018)
- Occupations: Businessman, UFO enthusiast
- Years active: 2019–present

Deeptanshu "Deep" Prasad is a Canadian businessman and UFO enthusiast.

== Biography ==
Deep Prasad was born in India and immigrated to Canada, where he studied at the University of Toronto, graduating in 2018 with a bachelor's degree in industrial engineering. In 2014, he was named one of Post City Toronto's "20 Under 20" recognizing Toronto's "top tweens and teens".

According to Prasad, he became interested in UFOs after reading about the 2017 Pentagon UFO videos. Sometime between then and 2019, he claims he was abducted by aliens and taken aboard their spaceship to experience something analogous to a kundalini awakening. In 2019, he announced he wanted to locate a UFO and reverse engineer it, and the same year became a supporter of UAP eXpeditions, a nonprofit that sought to determine if "fleets of UAP migrate from Catalina Island to Guadalupe Island" and if whale noises can be used to track them. He has been a speaker at the McMenamins Hotel Oregon UFO Festival and has been a guest on Gaia's Beyond Belief.

In March 2025, Prasad claims he was pursued through San Francisco by unknown men who shot at him. Prasad took shelter in his hotel where he posted an appeal on social media to Garry Tan to come to his aid. Park police, after investigating the claims, determined Prasad had mistaken nearby fireworks for gunfire, though, according to the San Francisco Standard, Prasad "stuck to his imaginary guns, demanding SFPD investigate the incident". Memes about Prasad's self-described assault became a brief, viral phenomenon, including one meme created by Jane Manchun Wong.

In 2018, Prasad founded and led the technology company, ReactiveQ. According to Pitchbook, the company was based in Toronto and had two employees before it went out of business in 2021. As of 2026, he is the founder and CEO of Canada-based technology company, GenMat.
