= Facebook like button =

Feature of the social networking website Facebook

The Facebook like button

The like button on the social networking website Facebook was first enabled on February 9, 2009. The like button enables users to easily interact with status updates, comments, photos and videos, links shared by friends, and advertisements. Once clicked by a user, the designated content appears in the News Feeds of that user's friends, and the button also displays the number of other users who have liked the content, including a full or partial list of those users. The like button was extended to comments in June 2010. After extensive testing and years of questions from the public about whether it had an intention to incorporate a "Dislike" button, Facebook officially rolled out "Reactions" to users worldwide on February 24, 2016, letting users long-press on the like button for an option to use one of five pre-defined emotions, including "Love", "Haha", "Wow", "Sad", or "Angry". Reactions were also extended to comments in May 2017, and had a major graphical overhaul in April 2019.

The like button is one of Facebook's social plug-ins, in which the button can be placed on third-party websites. Its use centers around a form of an advertising network, in which it gathers information about which users visit what websites. This form of functionality, a sort of web beacon, has been significantly criticized for privacy. Privacy activist organizations have urged Facebook to stop its data collection through the plug-in, and governments have launched investigations into the activity for possible privacy law violations. Facebook has stated that it anonymizes the information after three months, and that the data collected is not shared or sold to third parties. Additionally, the like button's potential use as a measurement of popularity has caused some companies to sell likes through fake Facebook accounts, which in turn have sparked complaints from some companies advertising on Facebook that have received an abundance of fake likes that have distorted proper user metrics. Facebook states in its Terms of Service agreement that users may only create one personal page, and it has ongoing efforts against the spread of fake accounts.

== Use on Facebook ==
The like button is a feature of social networking service Facebook, where users can like content such as status updates, comments, photos and videos, links shared by friends, and advertisements. The feature was activated February 9, 2009. It is also a feature of the Facebook Platform that enables participating websites to display a button that enables sharing the site's content with friends.

When a user clicks the like button, the content appears in the News Feeds of that user's friends. The button also displays the number of users who liked each piece of content, and may show a full or partial list of those users. The ability to like users' comments was added in June 2010, and the ability to react with one of five pre-defined emotions, including "Love", "Haha", "Wow", "Sad", or "Angry", was added in May 2017.

The Facebook reactions; left to right: Like, Love, Haha, Wow, Sad, Angry

Facebook describes "liking" as an "easy way to let people know that you enjoy it without leaving a comment".

After more than a year in testing, which included October 2015 availability in Ireland and Spain, Facebook officially rolled out "Reactions" to users worldwide on February 24, 2016. The feature allows users to long-press on the like button to get options between five pre-defined emotions ranging from "Love", "Haha", "Wow", "Sad", and "Angry". In June 2017, in celebration of Pride month, Facebook introduced a rainbow flag as part of its Reactions options.

The design of the reactions was updated in April 2019, with more frames comprising the icons' animations as well as a general graphical overhaul. The reactions were first shown off by reverse engineering expert Jane Manchun Wong on Twitter, with mixed reactions both as replies and on Facebook itself.

In September 2019 it was revealed that Facebook is conducting a trial in Australia to hide the like count on posts. In 2020 during the COVID-19 outbreak, a "Care" reaction was added to Facebook.

=== "Dislike" button ===
During a public Q&A session in December 2014, CEO Mark Zuckerberg answered questions regarding the public's wish to have a "dislike" button on Facebook. Zuckerberg said: "There's something that's just so simple about the 'like' button' ... but giving people more ways of expressing more emotions would be powerful. We need to figure out the right way to do it so it ends up being a force for good, not a force for bad and demeaning the posts that people are putting out there." While suggesting the comment field for users who feel the like button is not appropriate, he said that Facebook had "no plans" to introduce a dislike button.

In a new Q&A in September 2015, Zuckerberg said that Facebook was working on an "empathy button", such as for showing support to victims of tragedies. He further commented that "People aren't looking for an ability to downvote other people's posts. What they really want is to be able to express empathy. Not every moment is a good moment, right? And if you are sharing something that is sad, whether it's something in current events like the refugee crisis that touches you or if a family member passed away, then it might not feel comfortable to Like that post." In February 2016, Facebook announced its "Reactions", offering different ways for users to interact with posts through the like button, including "Love", "Haha", "Wow", "Sad", and "Angry", with the later addition of "Care" in March 2020 due to the COVID-19 pandemic.

=== Public ===
The Like button is one of Facebook's social plug-ins, which are features for websites outside Facebook as part of its Open Graph. Speaking at the company's F8 developer conference on April 21, 2010, the day of the launch, CEO Mark Zuckerberg said "We are building a Web where the default is social". The like button is implemented similarly to an advertising network, in that as more sites participate, Facebook is given a vast amount of information about who visits which websites and in what time period. When loading a website that has the like button enabled, the user's web browser connects to Facebook's servers, which record which website was visited, and by what user.

A week after the release of the social plugins, Facebook announced that 50,000 websites had installed the features, including the like button. Five months later, the number had increased to 2 million websites.

In December 2010 and in the United States, Microsoft's Bing search engine partnered with Facebook to identify which links in search results have been "liked" by the searcher's Facebook friends.

== Criticism ==
=== Fake "likes" ===
The number of "likes" on Facebook can serve as a measurement of interest and/or popularity in a particular brand, product or personality, though there have also been reports of the "overblown importance" of likes. Due to social media's influence in shaping reputations, there exist companies specializing in selling "likes" from fake accounts. This has caused issues for companies advertising on Facebook, due to receiving an abundance of likes without credibility that distort actual user metrics. Facebook's Terms of Service agreement states that users are only allowed to have one personal page, and it has an ongoing "war" against fake accounts. A May 2015 estimate put the number of fake accounts at 170 million, and a Symantec study in September 2011 found that 15% of 3.5 million video posts were made through fake likes.

=== Low reach ===
A content analysis highlights that the "like" reaction is likely to decrease the organic reach of the given Facebook post as a "brake effect". Facebook users often apply this interaction button, perhaps this is why Facebook may use "like" reaction as a negative element in algorithmic content ranking.

=== Tracking ===
Open letter to Facebook demanding civil rights changes

Social network like buttons on websites other than their own are often used as web beacons to track user activities for targeted advertising such as behavioral targeting combined with personally identifiable information, and may be considered a breach of Internet privacy. In June 2010, the American Civil Liberties Union, Center for Democracy and Technology, Center for Digital Democracy, Consumer Action, Consumer Watchdog, Electronic Frontier Foundation, Electronic Privacy Information Center, Privacy Activism, Privacy Lives, and Privacy Rights Clearinghouse sent an open letter to Facebook requesting that it "Do not retain data about specific visitors to third party sites that incorporate "social plugins" or the "like" button, unless the site visitor chooses to interact with those tools."

Multiple governments have also launched investigations into the activity. In September 2010, then-Privacy Commissioner of Canada Jennifer Stoddart announced new investigations against Facebook, alleging that the like button's appearance outside Facebook violates Canada's privacy laws. In August 2011, the German Data Protection Commissioner's Office ordered federal agencies to stop using Facebook and remove the like button from their websites. In November 2015, the government of Belgium gave Facebook 48 hours to cease tracking people who were not signed into Facebook, or else receive a daily fine of EUR€250,000, to which Facebook said it would appeal.

In its defense, Facebook told CNET in June 2010 that information on who visited which websites is anonymized after three months, and is not shared with or sold to third parties.

=== Free speech ===
In 2009, Sheriff B.J. Roberts of Hampton, Virginia fired several employees who had "liked" his rival's Facebook page during the sheriff's election. One of the employees fought back in court, with the argument that a "like" should be protected by the First Amendment to the United States Constitution about free speech. In September 2013, a federal appeals court ruled that "likes" are a form of protected speech under the amendment, commenting that "On the most basic level, clicking on the 'like' button literally causes to be published the statement that the User 'likes' something, which is itself a substantive statement. In the context of a political campaign's page, the meaning that the user approves of the candidacy whose page is being liked is unmistakable. That a user may use a single mouse click to produce that message that he likes the page instead of typing the same message with several individual key strokes is of no constitutional significance."

=== Declining organic reach for company pages ===
In 2014, Social@Ogilvy, a division of the advertising agency Ogilvy & Mather, published a widely cited white paper titled "Facebook Zero: Considering Life After the Demise of Organic Reach", documenting Facebook's restriction of content published from businesses' and brands' Pages. The zero refers to the projected percentage of any given Page's followers, or "Likers", who are able to see posts from that Page in their personal News Feeds. The paper's author observes that adjustments in Facebook algorithms have reduced organic reach for non-paying business pages (that have at least 500,000 Likes) from 16 percent in 2012 down to 2 percent in February 2014.

=== Ability for minors to "like" advertising ===
A lawsuit was filed in 2010 claiming that Facebook should not allow minors to "like" advertising. Facebook said the suit was "completely without merit".

=== Intimate user details ===
Research shows that Facebook likes can be automatically processed to infer intimate details about an individual, such as sexual orientation, political and religious views, race, substance use, intelligence, and personality. Effectively, individual views and preferences can be revealed — even if they were not directly expressed or indicated — by analysing likes for associated content.

=== Rembrandt legal action ===
On February 5, 2013, legal action was brought against Facebook by patent-holding company Rembrandt Social Media. Rembrandt owns several patents taken out by Dutch programmer Joannes Jozef Everardus van der Meer, who died in 2004. These include patents filed in 1998 relating to Van der Meer's in-development social network at Surfbook.com, created by Aduna, including, according to legal papers filed by the patent holder, the ability for users to approve data using a "like" button. Surfbook was based on technologies whose patents were filed by Van der Meer in 1998 and granted in 2001 and 2002. It allowed users share their information with selected people and approve posts using a "Like" button, and to link to external information.

In June 2014, Facebook successfully defended itself against the lawsuit after a jury found that Facebook did not infringe the patents, and separately found the patents to be invalid. The plaintiff (Rembrandt Social Media, LP) appealed the verdict, but it was upheld by a federal appeals court in February 2016.

=== Limited geographical reach of "Pride" reaction ===
In June 2017, in celebration of Pride month, Facebook introduced a rainbow flag as part of its Reactions options. However, access to the rainbow reaction depends on location. For "major markets with Pride celebrations", the Pride reaction is available by default, while in other areas, "liking" Facebook's LGBTQ page enables the feature. In areas where homosexuality is illegal, the feature is not available at all. This sparked debate, with Jillian York of Vice's Motherboard writing that "If Facebook's goal is to make the world more open and connected, it could start by treating queer communities with equality", and Tristan Greene of The Next Web writing that "What I don't understand, Facebook, is why you're limiting these things at all? Is there a premium on memory where you can only have so many rainbows before we have to shut Facebook down in the Eastern Hemisphere?" In a blog post, Facebook stated that the different levels of access was necessary "because this is a new experience we've been testing", although user feedback has questioned this line of thinking by pointing to earlier temporary reactions, including dedicated Halloween and Mother's Day reactions, that were available to all users despite not everyone celebrating.

== See also ==
- Emoticon
- Justin Rosenstein
- Thumb signal
