= McMenamins Hotel Oregon UFO Festival =

UFO convention commemorating the McMinnville UFO photos

McMenamins UFO Festival
- Nickname: McMenamins UFO Fest
- Frequency: Annual
- Location: McMinnville, Oregon
- Country: United States
- Sponsor: McMenamins Hotel Oregon
- Website: ufofest.com

The McMenamins UFO Festival is an annual UFO enthusiast event in McMinnville, Oregon, United States. First organized in 2000, it is the largest annual event in McMinnville, the largest UFO-themed event in Oregon, and the second-largest UFO-themed event in the United States. Notable persons who have appeared at the UFO festival include George Noory, George Knapp, Whitley Streiber, and Luis Elizondo, among others. The event was originally established to commemorate the 50th anniversary of the McMinnville UFO photographs, an alleged and heavily disputed UFO sighting that purportedly occurred in the area in 1950.

== History ==
The McMenamins Hotel Oregon UFO Festival was established in 2000 and has been an annual occurrence in McMinnville since that time, with the exception of 2020 when it was canceled due to the COVID-19 pandemic. The event has been sponsored since its inception by McMenamins.

The festival was founded to commemorate the 50th anniversary of the McMinnville UFO photographs, an alleged UFO sighting from 1950 that became the subject of increased debate following the conflicting findings of the Condon Committee and independent skeptics. McMenamins Hotel Oregon first started hosting the festival after McMenamins historian Tim Hills discovered that the anniversary of the photographs was approaching in 2000.

In 2016, the festival first organized around a single theme, the Phoenix Lights event of 1997 — an incident in UFO history during which members of the public in Arizona were unable to positively identify a formation of lights flying over the state, which have been varyingly explained as either A-10s participating in Operation Snowbird or as an experimental lighter-than-air craft. Speakers that year included Peter Davenport, an eyewitness named Lynne Kitei who authored a book on the subject and allegedly photographed the formation, another witness named Sue Watson, and Phoenix city councilor Frances Barwood.

Participants and attendees at past festivals have included Luis Elizondo, David Paulides, Jeremy Corbell, George Knapp, George Noory, Stanton Friedman, Whitley Streiber, Travis Walton, Bob Lazar, Nick Pope, Roger Leir, Irena Scott, Linda Moulton Howe, Deep Prasad, Budd Hopkins, and others.

== Size ==
By 2021, the event was attracting an annual turnout of up to 10,000 festivalgoers. As of 2025, it is the largest UFO enthusiast event in the state of Oregon, the second-largest UFO event in the United States after the UFO festival held in Roswell, New Mexico, and the largest annual event in McMinnville.

== Activities ==
Past events at the festival have included a pet costume contest, an alien costume parade, music, UFO trivia competitions, and an "Alien Abduction Dash 5K" run.

== Gallery ==
A scene from the costume parade at the 2005 festival

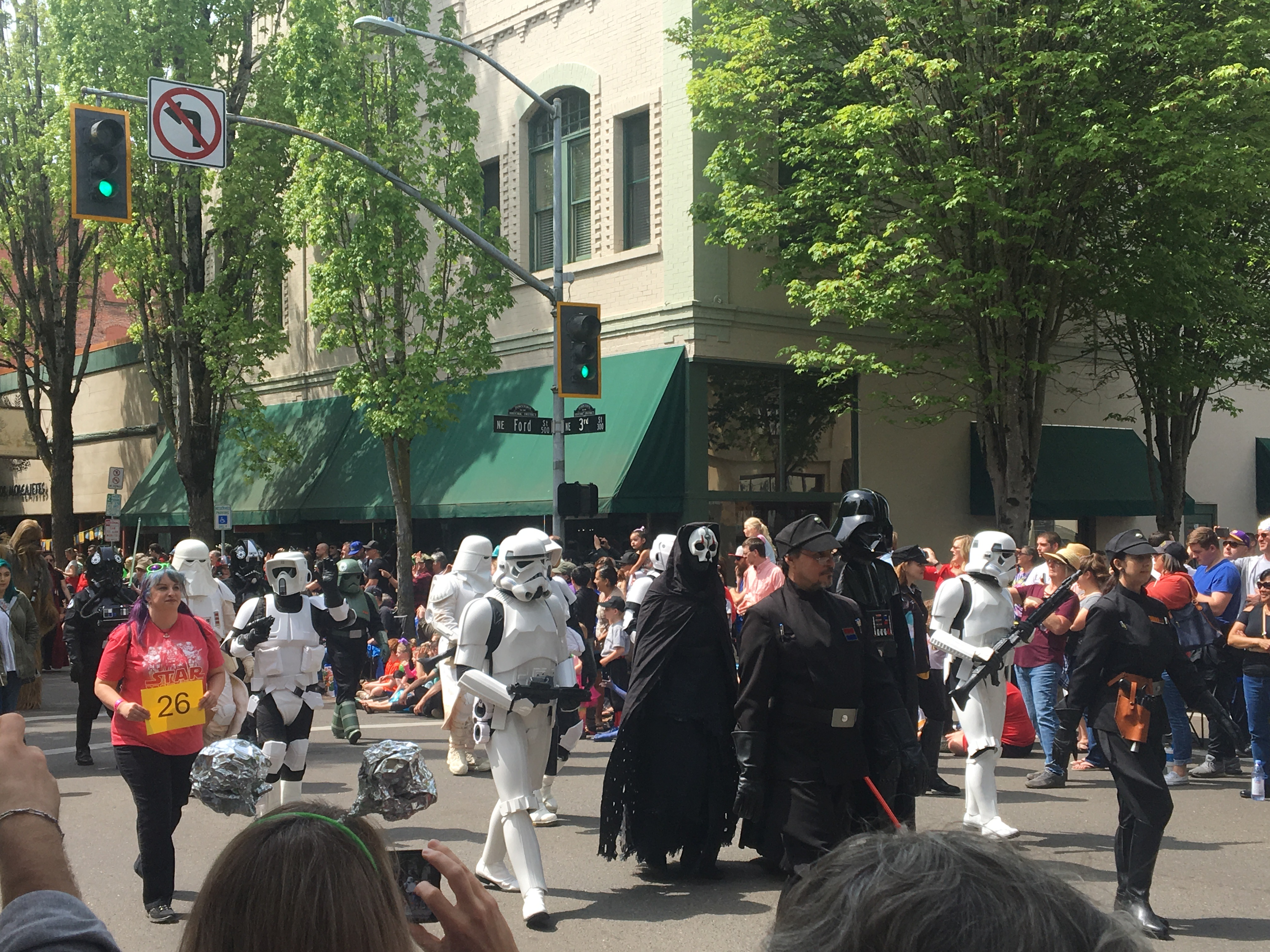
A scene from the costume parade at the 2018 festival

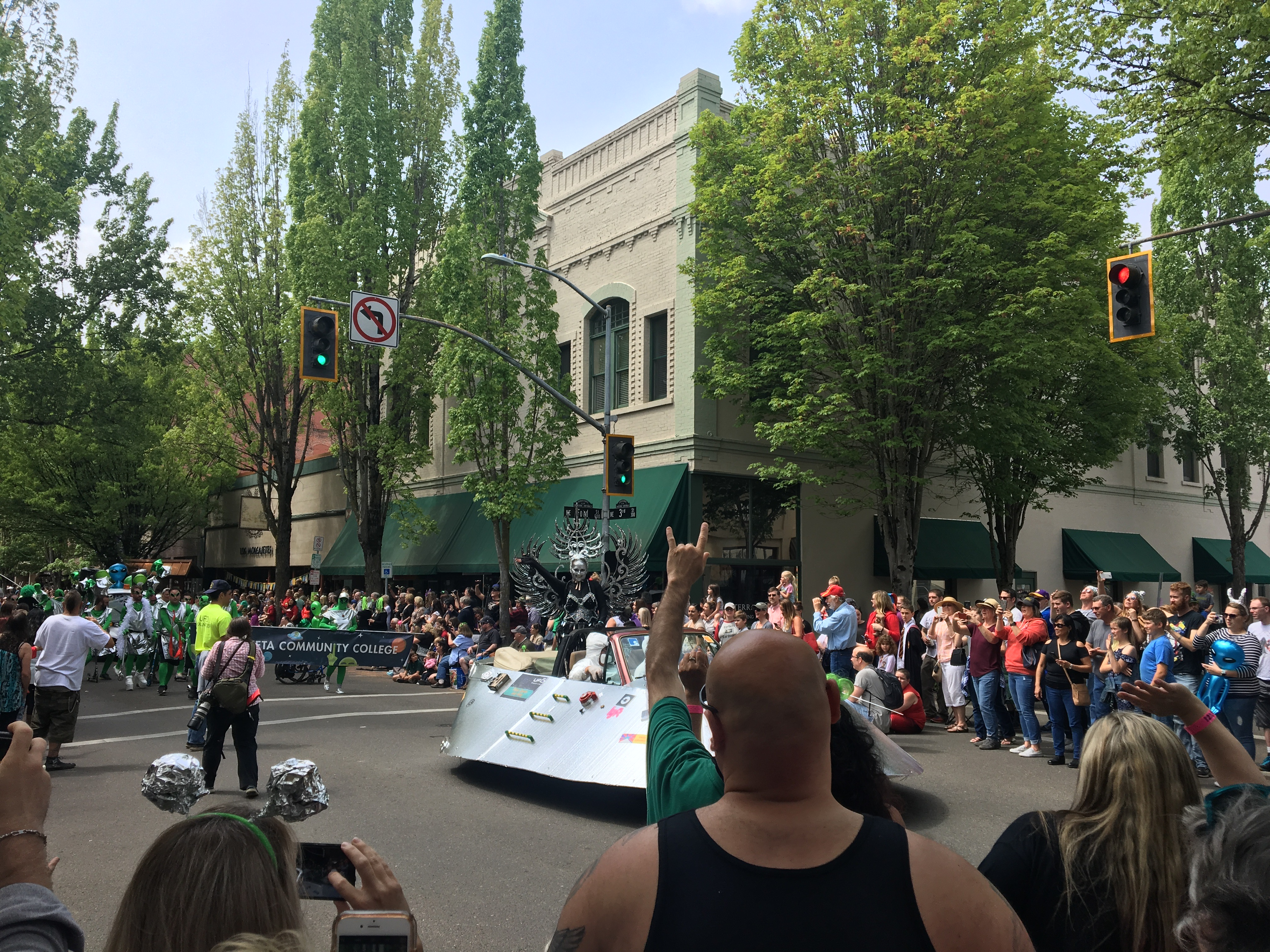
A scene from the costume parade at the 2018 festival

== See also ==
- Cardwell UFO Festival
