= Albert M. Chop =

Albert M. Chop (January 4, 1916 – January 15, 2006) was a newspaper reporter, a public relations officer in the aerospace industry, and a founding member of NASA's public relations office who served as Deputy Public Relations Director. Under Chop's leadership, cartoon character Snoopy became a symbol for NASA safety, with artist Charles M. Schulz drawing posters for NASA.

== Childhood and education ==
Albert Mathew Chop was born in Michigan, and educated in Calumet, Michigan and Cleveland, Ohio.

Attended night school at the University of Dayton. He met future wife, Delores Henderson, and began work in the Wire Photo Department of the Cleveland News, before transferring to Dayton and working as a reporter there.

== Public relations career ==
He joined the Marines around 1943. He served as a state-side correspondent during World War II and left the service in 1946.

After the war, Chop became Press Chief for Air Materiel Command in Dayton, Ohio. Starting in 1951, he spent two years at the Air Force press desk at the Pentagon. He left the Pentagon in February 1953 for Douglas Aircraft in Santa Monica, a post he held from 1953 to 1962. In 1956, Chop was played by actor Tom Towers in the film Unidentified Flying Objects: The True Story of Flying Saucers.

== Role at NASA ==
Chop joined NASA in 1962 and helped organize its public affairs office, working on Project Gemini and providing voice commentary during the Gemini missions. Served as deputy public affairs officer of NASA Manned Spaceflight Center. By 1971, Chop has risen to the post of manager of the motivation and training division of NASA's D.C. Headquarters. Chop pioneered the "Snoopy Program", an industry-wide motivation and safety program, featuring the Peanuts character Snoopy on safety posters and safety awards.

From 1975 to 1977, Chop was employed by the Atomic Energy Commission.

In November 1999, Chop participated in an oral history project from his home in Palm Desert, California. Chop died on January 15, 2006.
