= McMinnville UFO photographs =

Photographs taken in Oregon, US

Coordinates: 45.10072°N 123.33439°W

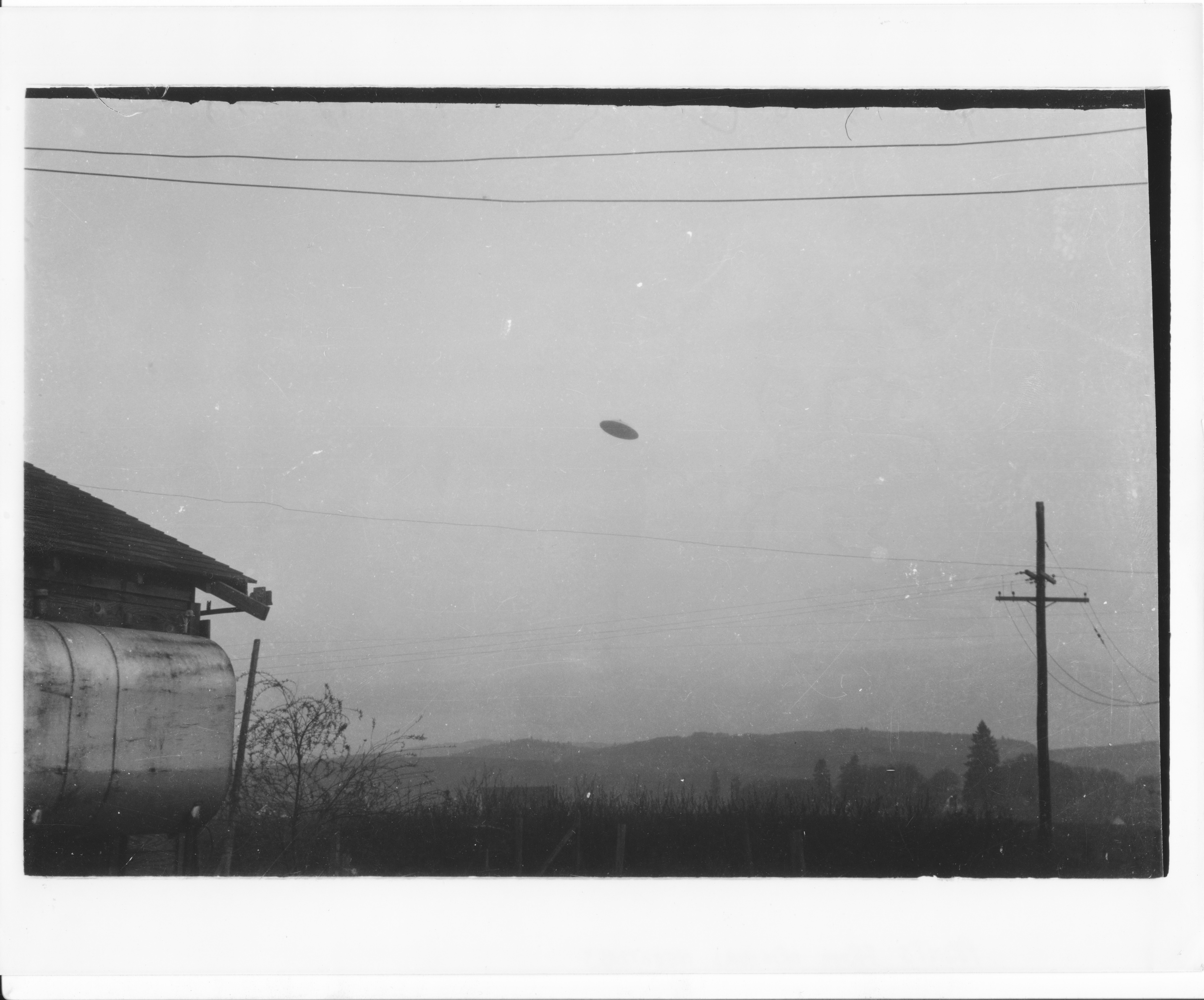
One of the McMinnville UFO photographs. Skeptics have argued that the UFO was probably a small model suspended by string or wires from the power lines visible at the top of the photo. Life magazine's article featured a cropped version of these photos with the uppermost power lines out of frame.

The McMinnville UFO photographs were taken on a farm near McMinnville, Oregon, United States, by Paul and Evelyn Trent in 1950. The images were reprinted in Life magazine and in newspapers across the United States, and are often considered to be among the most famous photographs ever taken of an alleged UFO. While Condon Committee investigator William K. Hartmann and ufologist Bruce Maccabee both argued that indications of apparent aerial perspective in the images may preclude the model hypothesis, skeptics Philip J. Klass and Robert Sheaffer asserted the photos were hoaxes based on lighting discrepancies and suggested the similarity of the object to a common automotive mirror. The Trents had reportedly claimed that they thought it was a secret military aircraft.

== Alleged sighting ==
Although the images have become known as the "McMinnville UFO Photographs", Paul and Evelyn Trent's farm was located just outside Sheridan, Oregon, approximately 13 miles (21 km) southwest of the city of McMinnville, a larger municipality.

According to astronomer William K. Hartmann's account, on 11 May 1950 at 7:30 p.m., Evelyn Trent was walking back to her house after feeding caged rabbits on her farm. Before reaching the house she claimed to see a slow-moving, metallic, disk-shaped object approaching from the northeast. She yelled for her husband, Paul Trent, who was inside the home; upon stepping outside, he claimed to have also witnessed the object. After a short time, he returned to the house for a camera, which was already loaded with film, and said that he managed to take two photos of the object before it sped away in a westward direction. Paul Trent's father also claimed to have briefly viewed the alleged object before it flew away.

Hartmann's version of the incident traces back to an interview the Trents gave to Lou Gillette of radio station KMCM (later KLYC) in McMinnville, which was quoted in The Oregonian newspaper on 10 June 1950. However, two days earlier on 8 June, a slightly different version of the incident attributed to the Trents was published in the Telephone-Register in McMinnville. According to the Telephone-Register account, Evelyn Trent stated: "We'd been out in the back yard. Both of us saw the object at the same time. The camera! Paul thought it was in the car but I was sure it was in the house. I was right—and the Kodak was loaded with film..."

== Initial publicity ==
A few exposures remained on the film in the Trents' camera, so the roll was not developed until the remaining frames were used for shooting family photographs that Mother's Day.

In a 1997 interview, the Trents claimed that they initially thought the object they had photographed was a secret military aircraft, and feared the "photos might bring them trouble". When he mentioned his sighting and photographs to Frank Wortmann, his banker, Wortmann was intrigued enough to display them in his bank window in McMinnville.

Shortly afterwards, local reporter Bill Powell convinced Mr. Trent to loan him the negatives. Powell examined the negatives and attested that he had found no evidence that they were tampered with or faked. On 8 June 1950, Powell's story of the incident—accompanied by the two photos—was published as a front-page story in the McMinnville Telephone-Register. The headline read: "At Long Last—Authentic Photographs Of Flying Saucer[?]"

The story and photos were subsequently picked up by the International News Service (INS) and sent to other newspapers around the nation, thus giving them wider publicity. Life magazine published cropped versions of the images on 26 June 1950, along with a photo of Trent and his camera. The Trents had been promised that the negatives would be returned; however, Life magazine informed them that it had misplaced the negatives.

== Condon Committee investigation ==
In 1967, the negatives were found in the files of the news service United Press International (UPI), which had merged with INS years earlier. The negatives were then loaned to William K. Hartmann, an astronomer who was working as an investigator for the government-funded UFO research project known as the Condon Committee, which was directed by Edward Condon and based at the University of Colorado Boulder. The Trents were not immediately informed that their "lost" negatives had been found. Hartmann interviewed the Trents and was impressed by their apparent sincerity; the Trents reportedly never received any money for their photos, and he could find no evidence that they had ever attempted to profit from them.

In Hartmann's analysis, he wrote to the Condon Committee that "This is one of the few UFO reports in which all factors investigated, geometric, psychological, and physical, appear to be consistent with the assertion that an extraordinary flying object, silvery, metallic, disk-shaped, tens of meters in diameter, and evidently artificial, flew within sight of two witnesses."

One reason for this conclusion was due to the photometric analysis of the images. Hartmann noted that the brightness of the underside of the object appeared to be lighter than the underside of an oil tank that was also featured in the images. This could be due to the effects of aerial perspective, (Note: Hartmann uses the terms "atmospheric extinction and scattering", but goes on to describe the concept of atmospheric perspective instead of atmospheric extinction.) the same effect that reduces the dynamic range of distant mountains and makes them appear "washed out" and blue. This effect suggested the object was further from the camera than the tank, as opposed to a smaller object of closer proximity.

Hartmann did, however, also point out the possibility that the images were manufactured. He noted that "The object appears beneath a pair of wires, as is seen in Plates 23 and 24. We may question, therefore, whether it could have been a model suspended from one of the wires. This possibility is strengthened by the observation that the object appears beneath roughly the same point in the two photos, in spite of their having been taken from two positions." He further admits that the "tests do not rule out the possibility that the object was a small model suspended from the nearby wire by an unresolved thread."

Hartmann also noticed a discrepancy that would later become the main point of objection for later skeptics. He noticed that the overall lighting of the image was consistent with conditions that would be expected around sunset, but noted that "There could be a possible discrepancy in view of the fact that the UFO, the telephone pole, possibly the garage at the left, and especially the distant house gables (left of the distant barn) are illuminated from the right, or east. The house, in particular, appears to have a shadow under its roof that would suggest a daylit photo, and combined with the eastward incidence, one could argue that the photos were taken on a dull, sunlit day at, say, 10 a.m."

After Hartmann concluded his investigation he returned the negatives to UPI, which then informed the Trents about them. In 1970, the Trents asked Philip Bladine, the editor of the News-Register (the successor of the Telephone-Register), to return the negatives; the Trents noted that they had never been paid for the negatives and thus wanted them back. Bladine asked UPI to return the negatives, which it did. However, for some reason, Bladine never contacted the Trents to inform them that the negatives had been returned.

== Ufologist's analysis ==
In 1975, negatives from the files of the News-Register were studied by ufologist Bruce Maccabee, who concluded that the photographs were not hoaxed and showed a "real, physical" object in the sky above the Trent farm. According to Maccabee, his analysis was based on densitometric measurements, similar to the photometric analysis performed by Hartmann. Maccabee argued that the relative position of nearby power lines and the brightness of the object's underside suggested it was a large object at some distance from the camera, similar to Hartmann's aerial perspective-based conclusion. Maccabee said he could find no evidence of a suspending thread or string, and rejected skeptical conclusions that the photograph was staged.

== Hoax explanation ==
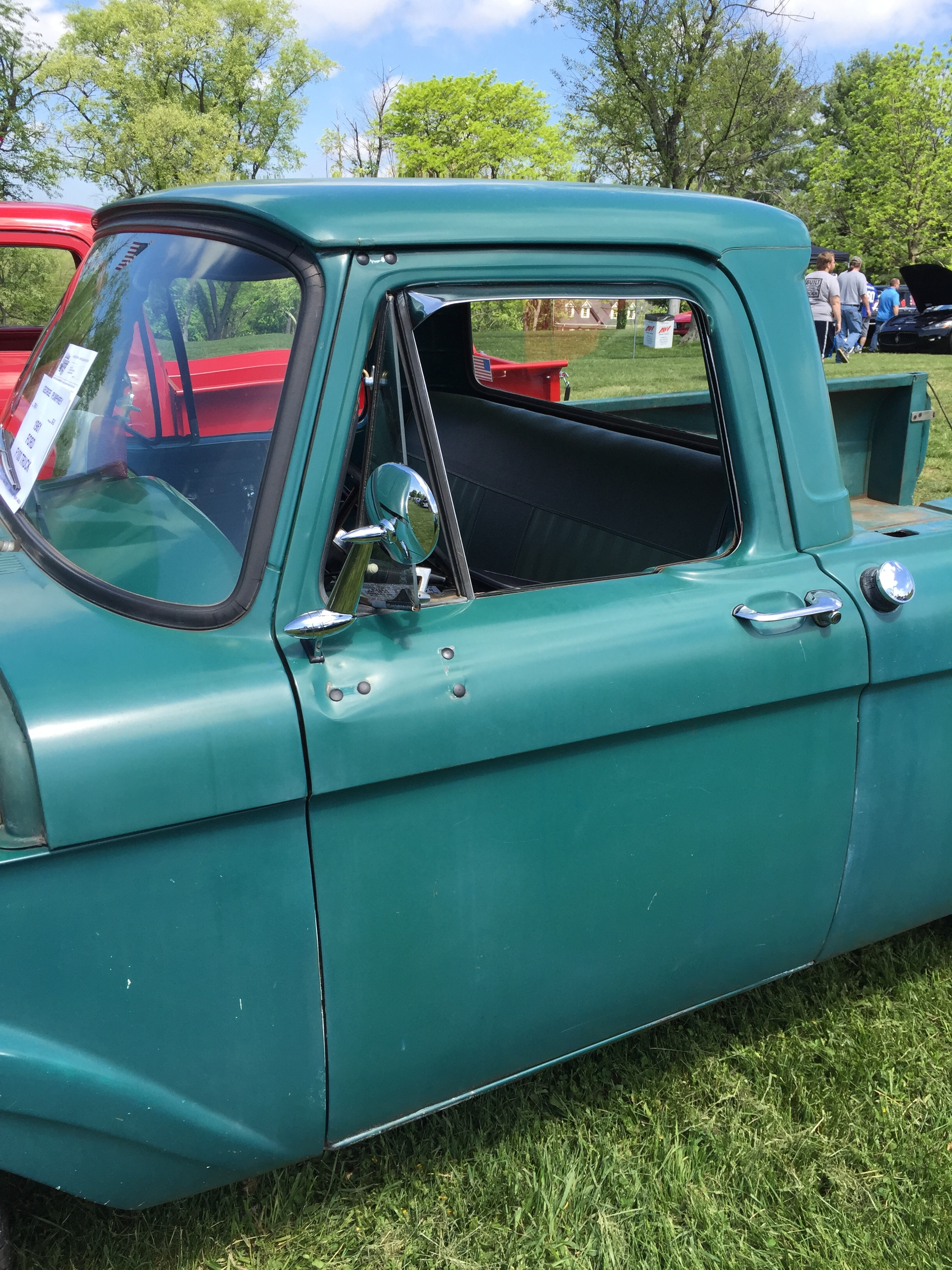
The wing mirror on this 1961 Ford F-100 bears a strong resemblance to the object seen in the photos, including the slight offset of the mounting screw, similar to the offset of the "antenna" detail in the images. Similar mirrors had been used for decades on numerous models of vehicles.

In the 1980s, Philip J. Klass and Robert Sheaffer, journalists and notable UFO skeptics, concluded that the Trent photos had been faked and that the entire event was a hoax.

Klass and Shaeffer's primary argument was that shadows cast on the garage in the left-hand portion of the photos indicated morning lighting conditions rather than early evening, contrary to what was reported. Klass and Sheaffer argued that if the Trents had apparently not been forthright about the time the photos were taken, their entire story was therefore suspect. They also noted that the Trents had shown an interest in UFOs prior to their claimed sighting.

Additionally, Klass and Sheaffer asserted that their analysis pointed to the photographed object being small, likely a model hanging from the power lines visible at the top of the photos. They also believed the object may have been the detached side-view mirror of a vehicle. It was noted that the object possessed a noticeably similar shape to the rounded mirrors installed on Ford vehicles for decades, as well as similar mirror assemblies used on a wide variety of vehicles from the era.

Additionally, Klass asserted that he found several contradictions in the Trents' story of the sighting and noted that their version of the incident had changed over the years. His conclusion was that the Trents had staged the two photographs.

Sheaffer has further stated: "My unpublished 1969 paper on this "classic" case (often referred to but never before available) caused the Condon report's chief investigator of that case to reconsider his conclusion."

In April 2013, three researchers with IPACO posted two studies to their website titled "Back to McMinnville pictures" and "Evidence of a suspension thread". They argued that the geometry of the photographs is most consistent with a small, hollow-bottomed model hanging from a wire suspended from the power lines above. Asserting that they had detected the presence of a thread above the object, they put forward their conclusion that "the clear result of this study was that the McMinnville UFO was a model hanging from a thread."

== Aftermath ==
The McMinnville UFO photographs remain among the best-publicized in UFO history. While skeptics continue to assert that the two photographs represent hoaxes and/or fakes, ufologists continue to argue that the Trent photos are credible evidence that UFOs are a real, physical phenomenon. Since 1950, the Trents have been consistently described by the media as unassuming, simple farm folk who apparently never attempted to profit from either the photos or the publicity that the photographs had brought them. Evelyn Trent died in 1997 and Paul Trent in 1998; they both insisted until their deaths that their sighting and the photos were genuine. The interest surrounding the Trent UFO photos led to the establishment of an annual "UFO Festival" in McMinnville; it is now the largest such gathering in the Pacific Northwest, and is the second-largest UFO festival in the United States after the one held in Roswell, New Mexico.

== See also ==
- Rhodes UFO photographs – UFO photographs taken in 1947 by William A. Rhodes
- Mariana UFO film – 1950 UFO sighting
- Passaic UFO photographs – Widely circulated photos of an alleged UFO taken in 1952
- Condon Committee – University of Colorado UFO Project
- McMenamins Hotel Oregon UFO Festival – UFO convention commemorating the McMinnville UFO photos
- UFO photographs – Photographs of unidentified flying objects

== Bibliography ==
- Clark, Jerome (1998). The UFO Book: Encyclopedia of the Extraterrestrial. Detroit, MI: Visible Ink Press. ISBN 1-57859-029-9. LCCN 97035767. OCLC 37370629.
- Condon, Edward U. (1968). Gillmor, Daniel S. (ed.). Final Report of the Scientific Study of Unidentified Flying Objects Conducted by the University of Colorado. Boulder, CO: University of Colorado Boulder. LCCN 72625998. OCLC 7577. Contract No. 44620-67-C-0035 (United States Air Force). Archived from the original on 22 February 2011.
- Denson, Bryan (1 May 2015). "Fifty years of UFO, the truth is still out there". The Oregonian. Archived from the original on 19 May 2015.
