= Cardwell UFO Festival =

Annual event in Queensland, Australia

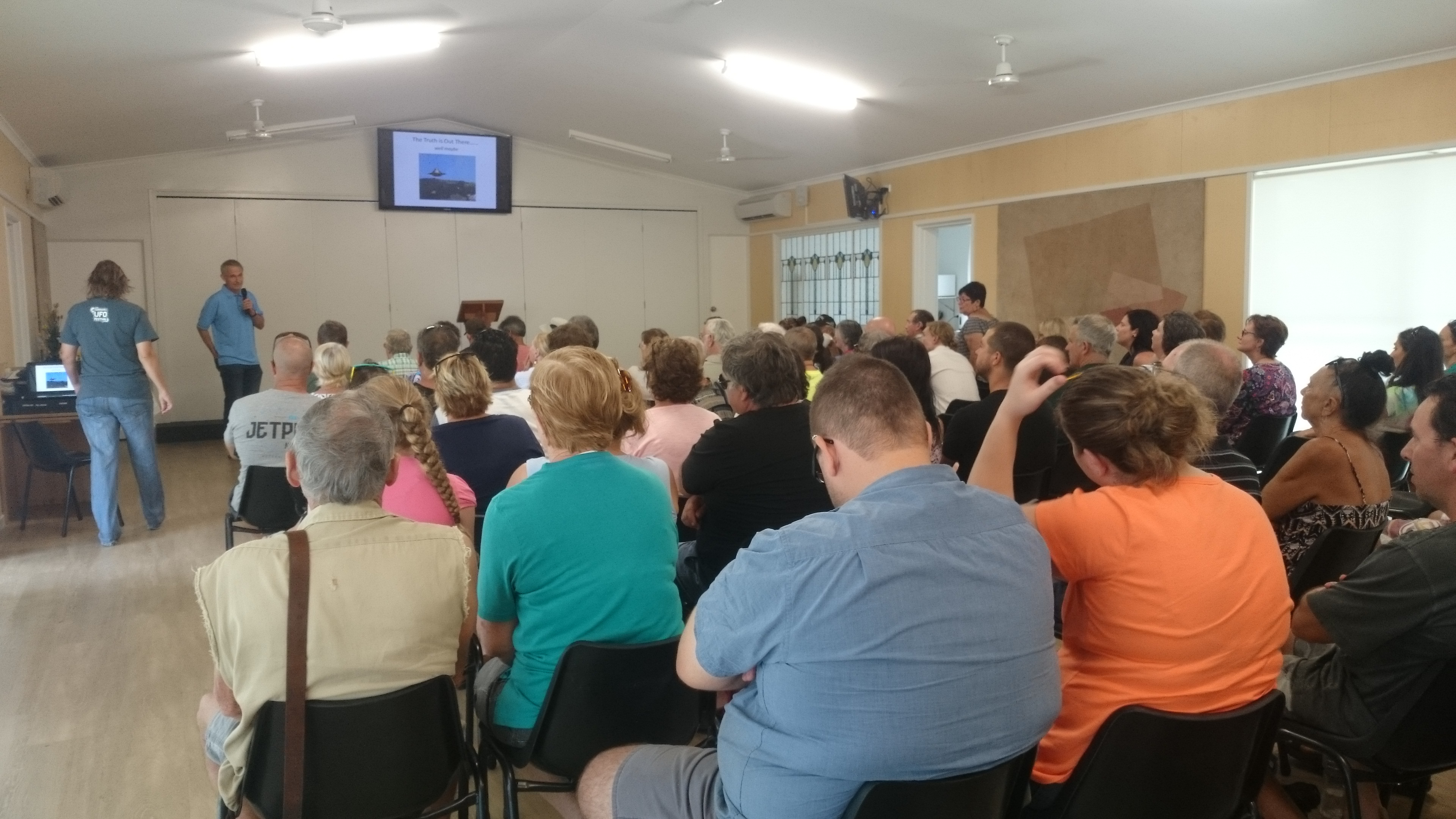
The C-Files is a forum for people to discuss their UFO experiences and other mysterious sightings.

Cardwell UFO Festival, an annual event in Cardwell, Queensland, is the only UFO festival in Australia. The event started in 2014 to discuss the unusual sightings and activities in the area, including the Tully Saucer Nests and the Cardwell Lights. The festival also includes entertainment, family fun, markets, food and an alien-themed costume party.

In 2017, the Festival was named to the Top 10 Festivals for UFO and Alien Lovers and to Australia's 7 Most Eyebrow-Raising Festivals.

== C-Files ==
The festival includes the C-Files, a forum for people to discuss their UFO experiences as well as other mysterious sightings including the Min Min lights, rainforest pygmies, hairy men and large black cats. Guest speaker at the 2016 forum was Alec Birmacombe from Queensland UFO Research.

== See also ==
- McMenamins Hotel Oregon UFO Festival
