= Mariana UFO film =

1950 UFO sighting

A segment from the 1956 film UFO, which includes footage of the incident, testimony from Nick Mariana, and an analysis by Robert M. L. Baker

The Mariana UFO incident was a well-publicized UFO sighting that occurred in Great Falls, Montana on August 15, 1950. The sighting, filmed by local baseball coach Nick Mariana, is believed to be among the earliest motion picture footage of what would soon come to be called an unidentified flying object (UFO). The U.S. Air Force, after a short investigation, concluded that what Mariana had actually filmed were sun reflections of two F-94 jet fighters, a claim that the Air Force later retracted, and then eventually endorsed again. The results of multiple investigations of the incident have been inconclusive.

== Incident ==
Location of Great Falls, Montana

At 11:29 am on August 15, 1950, Nick Mariana, the general manager of the Great Falls Electrics minor league baseball team, and his nineteen-year-old secretary, Virginia Raunig, were inspecting the baseball field at empty Legion Stadium shortly before a game. A bright flash caught Mariana's eye and, according to his reports, he saw two rotating bright silvery objects, flying over Great Falls at a speed he estimated to be around 200 to 400 miles per hour (320 to 640 km/h). He believed that they were roughly 50 feet (15 m) wide and 150 feet (46 m) apart. Mariana ran to his car to retrieve his 16 mm movie camera and filmed the UFOs for sixteen seconds. The camera could film the objects in color, but was unable to record sound. Raunig also witnessed the objects.

The day after Mariana's sighting, the Great Falls Tribune, the city's daily newspaper, described his sighting and the film in an article, which was picked up by other media outlets around the nation. For several weeks after the sighting, Mariana showed his film to local community groups, including the Central Roundtable Athletic Club.

== Air Force investigation ==
After seeing the film, a reporter for the Great Falls Tribune called Wright-Patterson Air Force Base in Ohio and informed them of Mariana's sighting and film. U.S. Air Force Captain John P. Brynildsen interviewed Mariana at nearby Malmstrom AFB outside of Great Falls. When Mariana and Ms. Raunig both told him that they had seen two jet fighters pass over the baseball stadium shortly after the sighting, Brynildsen felt that perhaps the jets were the objects Mariana had seen and captured on film. With Mariana's permission, Capt. Brynildsen sent the film to Wright-Patterson AFB for analysis. He told a reporter in Great Falls that he had received approximately eight feet (2.4 m) of film from Mariana. In his message to Wright-Patterson, however, he said that he was sending roughly fifteen feet (4.6 m) to the base for study. According to UFO historian Jerome Clark, this discrepancy was never cleared up.

At Wright-Patterson AFB, the film was briefly examined and determined to be the reflections from two F-94 jet fighters that were known to be flying over Great Falls at the time of Mariana's sighting. Lt. Col. Ray W. Taylor returned the film to Mariana with a cover letter stating that "our photoanalysts were unable to find anything identifiable of an unusual nature". However, according to Air Force officer Edward J. Ruppelt, who would become the supervisor of the Air Force's Project Blue Book investigation into UFO reports in 1951, "in 1950 there was no interest [by the Air Force] in the UFO, so after a quick viewing, Project Grudge had written them off as the reflections from two F-94 jet fighters that were in the area".

Controversy soon arose when Mariana claimed that the first thirty-five frames of his film – which he said most clearly showed the UFOs as rotating disks – were missing. People in the Great Falls area who had viewed Mariana's film supported his claims. They claimed that the missing frames clearly showed the UFOs as spinning, metallic disks with a "notch or band" along their outer edges. The Air Force personnel denied this accusation, and insisted that they had removed only a single frame of film which was damaged in the analysis.

== Lawsuit ==
In January 1951, Bob Considine, a writer and UFO skeptic, wrote an article for Cosmopolitan entitled "The Disgraceful Flying Saucer Hoax", intended to debunk the most famous UFO sightings to that date, including Mariana's sighting and film. Claiming that Considine's article implied that he was "a liar, prankster, half-wit, crank, publicity hound and fanatic", Mariana filed a lawsuit for slander against Considine. The lawsuit was eventually dropped in September 1955.

== Later studies ==
In July 1952, Captain Ruppelt was able to convince Mariana to let the Air Force see the film again for a more detailed analysis. Mariana reluctantly agreed, but only after requiring the Air Force to sign an agreement that they would not remove any frames of the film. The film analysts at Wright-Patterson AFB concluded that the objects in Mariana's film were not "birds, balloons, or meteors". The original conclusion that the objects were reflections from the F-94 jets was also ruled out. In his memoirs, Ruppelt wrote: "The two jets weren't anywhere close to where the two UFOs had been... we studied each individual light and both appeared too steady to be reflections. We drew a blank on the Montana Movie, it was an unknown".

In January 1953, the Air Force and CIA convened a committee of prominent scientists to examine the "best" cases collected by Project Blue Book. Called the Robertson Panel, after its chairman, physicist H.P. Robertson, it viewed Mariana's UFO film. The scientists judged that the objects in the film were "reflections of aircraft known to have been in the area".

=== Baker analysis ===
In 1954, Greene-Rouse productions decided to make a documentary film about the UFO phenomenon. They asked Nick Mariana for the rights to use his footage in the documentary, and Mariana agreed. To analyze the film, they hired Robert M.L. Baker, Jr., a scientist and engineer for the Douglas Aircraft company. Baker completed his analysis of Mariana's film in early 1956. He concluded that the explanation that the objects were simply reflections from F-94 jets was "quite strained".

In 1968, Baker testified before a Congressional hearing on UFOs. He commented on his analysis of the Mariana film:

Preliminary analysis excluded most natural phenomena. More detailed study indicated that the only remaining natural phenomenon candidate for the Utah film was birds in flight, and for the Montana film it was airplane fuselage reflections of the sun. After about 18 months of rather detailed, albeit not continuous, study using various film-measuring equipments [sic] at Douglas and at UCLA, as well as analysis of a photogrammetric experiment, it appeared that neither of these hypothesized natural phenomena explanations had merit.

In 1969, Baker presented a paper at an AAAS UFO panel organized by Thornton Page and Carl Sagan. He discussed the Mariana film as well as other films and photographs of UFOs. Baker concluded that the Mariana film was unidentifiable. He emphasized the importance of improving the quality of photographic data before speculating about the nature of UFOs.

=== Condon Report ===
In 1966, the U.S. government established and funded a study of the UFO phenomenon. Located at the University of Colorado at Boulder and chaired by prominent physicist Edward U. Condon, the committee's researchers decided to "reinvestigate" Mariana's UFO film. The Condon Committee assigned two investigators to study the case: Roy Craig, a physicist who was generally skeptical of UFOs, and David Saunders, a psychologist who had long been interested in the Mariana UFO incident.

Saunders and Craig soon added a new problem to the case: they were not sure whether the film had been taken on August 5 or August 15, 1950. After interviewing Mariana, the two researchers came to different conclusions about the film. Craig remained skeptical of Mariana's claims that 35 frames had been removed from the footage: "the comment I considered most significant, which Mariana's ex-secretary made to me during a telephone interview...when I pressed for information or beliefs regarding clipping of the film by the Air Force. The very hesitant comment was, 'What you have to remember in all this is... that Nick Mariana is a promoter'. That comment was adequate to close our conversation". In his memoirs, Craig also wrote that: "I would not like to have to defend Dr. Saunders's conviction that the Mariana film is strong evidence that we have extraterrestrial visitors". However, Saunders thought the Mariana film was a crucial case in the Colorado Project's case files. Impressed by Baker's analysis, Saunders was suspicious of the discrepancy over the missing frames at the beginning of the Mariana film. He was particularly concerned with reports that the first three seconds of the film that were missing clearly indicated the objects were spinning discs. He came to the conclusion that Mariana's film "was the one sighting of all time that did more than any other single case to convince me that there is something to the UFO problem".

William Hartmann, an astronomer for the University of Arizona, analyzed the Mariana UFO film for the Condon Report. His conclusion was that "past investigations have left airplanes as the principal working hypothesis. The data at hand indicate that while it strains credibility to suppose that these were airplanes, the possibility nonetheless cannot be entirely ruled out. There are several independent arguments against airplane reflections."

== Legacy ==
Copies of Mariana's film currently reside in the US National Archives. It is still featured in documentaries, television programs, and shared online. The film continues to be debated. Since Mariana's sighting, over 100 other UFO sightings have been made in Great Falls, Montana, making it one of the most active locations for UFO sightings in North America. In 2008, the minor league baseball team in Great Falls was renamed the Great Falls Voyagers in honor of the Mariana UFO incident.

== See also ==
- List of reported UFO sightings
- UFO
- Rhodes UFO photographs (1947)
- McMinnville UFO photographs (May 1950)
- Passaic UFO photographs (1952)
- Malmstrom UFO incident (1967)
