= UFO (1956 film) =

1956 American film

UFO Unidentified Flying Objects
- Directed by: Winston Jones
- Written by: Francis Martin
- Produced by: Edward Small; Clarence Greene; Russell Rouse
- Starring: Tom Towers
- Narrated by: Les Tremayne; Olan Soule; Marvin Miller; John Brown
- Cinematography: Howard A. Anderson
- Edited by: Chester W. Schaeffer
- Music by: Ernest Gold
- Production company: Ivar Productions
- Distributed by: United Artists
- Release date: May 9, 1956
- Running time: 90 minutes
- Country: United States
- Language: English

UFO (full title: Unidentified Flying Objects: The True Story of Flying Saucers) is a 1956 American semi-documentary about the development of the UFO phenomenon in the United States. Clips from the documentary have often been used in other documentaries and television programs related to UFOs.

== Origins and plot ==
A segment from UFO, which includes footage of the Mariana UFO incident, testimony from the witness who filmed it, and an analysis by Robert M.L. Baker

In 1952, Hollywood producer Clarence Greene saw an unusual object twisting in the sky. He decided to report the sighting, and contacted U.S. Air Force public information officer Albert M. Chop, who was in charge of answering UFO questions from reporters and the public. Intrigued by his experience, Greene decided to produce a documentary film about the UFO phenomenon. When Chop told Greene about the existence of UFO footage, Greene obtained the material for analysis and display in his documentary.

The film begins with a statement about its genre:

Many times in the history of our civilization the introduction of a new thought has brought skepticism, even ridicule. Despite this, there always has remained the duty and inalienable right to tell the people the truth. The Motion Picture you are about to see is true. It is not fiction. Much of the information in it has never been told. You will see it here for the first time.

The documentary starts in 1947, with the first widely publicized UFO sightings in the United States, including recreations of the Kenneth Arnold UFO sighting, the Mantell UFO incident, and the Gorman Dogfight. It then traces the development of UFOs as both a popular fad and as a serious concern for the U.S. Air Force. The history of Project Sign, the first Air Force study of the UFO phenomenon, is discussed.

The documentary then shifts focus to protagonist Albert M. Chop, who is assigned as the public information officer at Wright-Patterson Air Force Base in Dayton, Ohio, in the late 1940s. In that position, he is required to answer numerous news media queries about UFO sightings and what the Air Force knows about them. Chop interviews a German rocket scientist (formerly of Peenemünde's V-2 rocket program) now working for America; the scientist lends credence to the possibility that UFOs exist. Although he is initially portrayed as a UFO debunker, Chop gradually changes his views as the movie progresses, and he comes to believe that UFOs are unknown, and possibly extraterrestrial, craft.

By 1952, Chop has moved to Washington, D.C., where he is the press spokesman for Project Blue Book. The documentary analyzes two famous pieces of UFO footage: the Mariana UFO Incident of 1950, in which the manager of the minor-league baseball team in Great Falls, Montana, claimed to have filmed two UFOs flying over the local baseball stadium, and the 1952 UFO film taken near the Great Salt Lake in Utah by a U.S. Navy photographer, Delbert Newhouse. The documentary concludes with the famous 1952 Washington, D.C., UFO incident, in which Albert Chop played a central role. The documentary recreates Chop's experiences during the mass sighting, and Chop ultimately states his belief that UFOs are a "real", physical phenomenon of unknown origin at the close of the documentary.

== Cast ==
- Willis Sperry ... Himself.
- Nicholas Mariana ... Himself.
- Delbert Newhouse ... Himself.
- Wendell Swanson ... Himself.
- U.S. Air Force General John A. Samford ... Himself.
- Tom Towers ... Albert M. (Al) Chop, U.S. Air Force press officer.
- Floyd Burton ... Major Dewey Fournet, Project Blue Book's liaison at the Pentagon.
- Gene Coughlan ... Editor, Dayton Daily News
- Bert Freed ... Colonel, U.S. Air Force.
- Stan Gordon ... Reporter.
- Marie Kenna ... Mrs. Albert Chop.
- Harry Morgan ... "Air Force 2162/Air Force 162" and "Red Dog One" (Voice).
- Robert Phillips ... U.S. Air Force Captain Edward Ruppelt, Project Blue Book Supervisor.
- William Solomon ... German scientist, formerly of Peenemünde V-2 rocket program.
- Olan Soule ... Narrator.

== Trivia ==
Actor Harry Morgan, who would later become famous for his roles on the television series M*A*S*H and Dragnet, portrays the voice, albeit disguised, of a pilot with call sign "Air Force 2162" (later "Air Force 162") during the foul weather/GCA-assisted landing scene, and more distinctively as Air Force pilot "Red Dog One" during scenes describing the 1952 Washington, D.C., UFO incident. Morgan's Dragnet co-star, Jack Webb, was producer and narrator for the 1978 television series Project U.F.O., which recreated the real-life Project Blue Book.

== See also ==
- The Report On Unidentified Flying Objects, a similar book also from 1956
- UFOs: Past, Present, and Future, a similar film from 1976
- UFO Cover Up? Live, a similar TV broadcast from 1988
