= BASc =

BASc may refer to:

- Bachelor of Applied Science
- Bachelor of Arts and Science
