= SOBEPS =

Belgian UFO investigation group

SOBEPS (an acronym for Société belge d'étude des phénomènes spatiaux, "Belgian society for the study of space phenomena") was a UFO investigation group, famed for its investigation of the black triangle incidents in Belgium, known as the Belgian Wave, in 1989 and 1990.

== History ==
The society was formed in 1971 and had 700 registered members before the end of the year. It was hosted in a small office room owned by its general secretary, Lucien Clerebaut, and its main activity was the publication of a magazine, Inforespace, in 1972. Membership rose to 1750 in 1976, and Clerebaut purchased a building in Anderlecht for the society the same year. However, its popularity then started to decline, with a drop in membership down to 500 members in 1985; Inforespace went from a publication rate of six per year down to only two per year.

But in November 1989, a wave of UFO sightings struck Belgium, bringing the SOBEPS into the mediatic spotlight. It received hundreds of testimonies and collaborated with the Belgian Air Force on a fruitless UFO hunt in April 1990.

Due to financial difficulties, the SOBEPS dissolved on 31 December 2007, and the COBEPS (Comité Belge pour l’Étude des Phénomènes Spatiaux or Belgian Committee for the Study of Space Phenomena) was formed to continue some of the SOBEPS's activities.

== Bibliography ==
- Des soucoupes volantes aux OVNI (1976), a compilation of articles from Inforespace.
- La Chronique des OVNI (1977), a history of UFO sightings previous to 1947, by Michel Bougard
- Vague d'OVNI sur la Belgique (two books, 1991 and 1994), a catalogue of the observations of the Belgian UFO wave of 1989 and 1990.

== References and further reading ==
Articles criticising the work done by the SOBEPS

- Leclet, R., Maillot, E., Munsch, G., Scornaux, J. & van Utrecht, W. "The Belgian UFO Wave of 1989–1992 – A Neglected Hypothesis" (PDF)..
- Abrassart, J-M (2010). The Beginning of the Belgian UFO wave. SUNLite, vol. 2, num. 6, p. 21-23.
