= Belgian UFO wave =

1989–1990 sightings of triangular UFOs

The Belgian UFO wave was a series of sightings of triangular UFOs in Belgium, which lasted from 29 November 1989 to April 1990.

== The sightings ==
The Belgian UFO wave began in November 1989, in the city of Eupen. Reports were filed, and 143 people claimed to have witnessed an unidentified flying object, though most of these reports were submitted over a week after the purported event and also following media coverage. Many of the reports alleged the existence of a large object flying at low altitude. Some reports also stated that the craft was of a flat, triangular shape, with lights underneath. Skeptic Brian Dunning asserts that the original 29 November (Note: Dunning makes a minor error in his article stating the date as "29 September" when discussing the helicopter hypothesis.) report was actually an object with a stick protruding from one end with a turbine, accompanied by a low engine noise; this has led many to conclude the object was a Bell UH-1 Huey helicopter.

The Belgian UFO wave peaked with the events of the night of 30 March 1990, wherein an unknown object was tracked on radar, and two Belgian Air Force F-16s were sent to investigate. However, neither pilot reported visual confirmation of the object. According to Dunning, all reports from the public were received after the date of the incident. Following the encounter, the Belgian Air Force released a report detailing the events of that night.

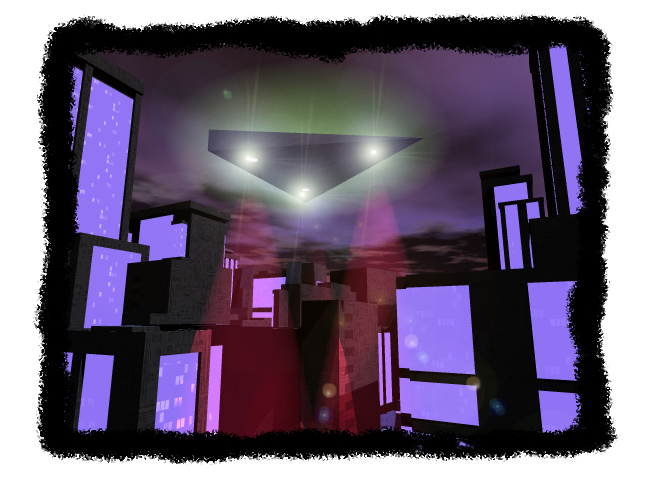
CGI reconstruction of testimonies

At around 23:00 on 30 March 1990, the supervisor for the Control Reporting Center (CRC) at Glons received reports that three unusual lights were seen in the direction of Thorembais-Gembloux, which lies southeast of Brussels. Glons CRC requested the gendarmerie in Wavre send a patrol to confirm the sighting.

A second set of lights was reported having moved towards the first triangle approximately 10 minutes later. Traffic Center Control at Semmerzake tracked one object on its radar, and an order to scramble two F-16 fighters from Beauvechain Air Base was given. Multiple witnesses claimed that the phenomenon was visible from the ground; the Air Force report further states: "Their respective position does not change. The whole formation seems to move slowly in comparison with the stars."

Over the next hour, the two scrambled F-16s attempted nine separate interceptions of the targets. On three occasions, they managed to obtain a radar lock for a few seconds, but these were later asserted by Dunning to be locks on each other. The pilots never reported visually confirming the alleged objects or their anomalous manoeuvres. Per Dunning, not only did neither F-16 ever lock onto any objects apart from the other fighter, he further asserted that the other contacts were all found to be the result of a well-known atmospheric interference called Bragg scattering.

After 00:30, radar contact became much more sporadic and the final confirmed radar lock took place at 00:40. Following several further unconfirmed contacts, the F-16s eventually returned to base shortly after 01:00.

Members of the Wavre gendarmerie were sent to confirm the original report from earlier in the night, and Captain Pinson described four lights being arranged in a square formation, all making short jerky movements, before gradually losing their luminosity and disappearing in four separate directions at around 01:30.

== Patrick Maréchal hoax photograph ==
The famous image of an ostensible UFO in the 1990 wave. In 2011, the photographer Patrick Maréchal stated it was a picture of a polystyrene triangle with four lightbulbs.

In April 1990, a photo of a black triangular object with three lights at its corners was released by an anonymous photographer. Published at the height of the wave, the photo was widely seen in newspapers and other sources, known as the "Petit-Rechain photo". The photograph was examined by a number of sources, including NASA, the French National Centre for Scientific Research, and the Belgian Royal Military Academy, but none could positively identify it or find obvious signs of fakery. There were concerns about its authenticity, not only due to the lack of reference objects in frame, but also since it was reportedly shown to be reproducible with practical effects early on. It was also questioned due to the anonymous release, but these concerns were rejected by proponents and the debate lingered. For 20 years, the ufological organization Société belge d'étude des phénomènes spatiaux (SOBEPS) claimed that this picture was genuine, while others like Les repas ufologiques parisiens were not sure, pointing to apparent anomalies wherein the motion blur seemed mathematically inconsistent with what would be expected in three-dimensional space.

On 26 July 2011, in an interview for the Belgian TV channel RTL, Patrick Maréchal explained that it was a hoax that he had constructed to fool his workmates. He demonstrated how he had created the hoax UFO, by cutting a piece of styrofoam into a triangle, painting it black, embedding a flashlight in each corner, and hanging it from a string.

In his 27 September 2016 Skeptoid podcast episode titled "The Belgian UFO Wave," author Brian Dunning discussed the photographic evidence and said that the single photograph is emblematic of the quality of all the evidence that characterized the Belgian UFO wave.

== Explanations ==
In 1992, about three years after the first sighting, Marc Hallet wrote an essay about the Belgian UFO wave criticizing the work done by SOBEPS: La Vague OVNI Belge ou le triomphe de la désinformation, arguing that this ufological organisation was spreading misinformation in the media. Hallet's thesis was that the Belgian UFO wave was mostly a mass delusion, boosted by the work done by SOBEPS. This mass delusion would have followed Philip J. Klass' law:

Once news coverage leads the public to believe that UFOs may be in the vicinity, there are numerous natural and man-made objects which, especially seen at night, can take on unusual characteristics in the minds of hopeful viewers. Their UFO reports in turn add to the mass excitement, which encourages still more observers to watch for UFOs. This situation feeds upon itself until such time as the media lose interest in the subject, and then the flap quickly runs out of steam.

In 1993, Pierre Magain and Marc Remy published an article in Physicalia Magazine, in which their conclusions deviated from those of SOBEPS. They also stated that the Belgian UFO wave would have been better studied by people in the human sciences than by physicists.

In The Belgian UFO Wave of 1989–1992 – A Neglected Hypothesis, Renaud Leclet et al. discussed the fact that some sightings could be explained by helicopters. Though most witnesses reported that the objects were silent, this report argued that the lack of noise could have been due to the engine noise in the witnesses' automobiles, or strong natural wind blowing away from the witnesses.

In his article The Beginning of the Belgian UFO wave, Jean-Michel Abrassart argued that the events surrounding the beginning of the wave did not contradict the psychosocial hypothesis, contrary to what SOBEPS claimed in its work. In an article published on his website in 2011, The Belgian Wave and the photos of Ramillies, Auguste Meessen replied to several criticisms by Roger Paquay and Jean-Michel Abrassart and argued that, according to him, the Belgian UFO wave was completely unexplained. Roger Paquay and Jean-Michel Abrassart both wrote rebuttals to the Belgian physicist's article.

In "The Belgian UFO Wave" Skeptoid podcast episode, Brian Dunning discussed the F-16 chase and reported that:

The pilots also got intermittent contact with objects, but they appeared and disappeared and moved up and down too fast, including going underground. The pilots never saw anything at all. SOBEPS reported that they obtained radar lock on targets nine times; but the Belgian military only reported three such locks, and upon analyzing the data, all three radar locks were on each other. The other contacts were all found to be the result of a well-known atmospheric interference called Bragg scattering.

Regarding the "wave" of eyewitness reports and lack of photographic evidence, Dunning concluded:

You read a story in the paper that a UFO was seen flying over your town a night or two ago. You remember that you saw something you took for a bright star or an airplane, thought nothing of it at the time, but this amazing new story makes you realize that what you saw must have been this UFO. You and I might not necessarily make that connection, but it's perfectly reasonable that a lot of people will; and so they follow the instructions in the newspaper article and send a report to SOBEPS. With so many articles over a period of years in a small country, it's no great surprise that SOBEPS reported they eventually received as many as 2,600 in all. The 143 reports Meessen claims for the original 29 November incident were indeed received, but only after more than a week of aggressive and repeated solicitation in the mass media. It is only much later retellings of the story that wrongly assume all 2,600 were reported as people were watching the F-16s chase the UFOs, or that all 143 initial reports came independently on that first night. All the reports were after the fact, and were only made after prompting and solicitation by SOBEPS and the media. It was simply a psychosocial phenomenon, which is why there is no evidence and only the one questionable photograph. If 13,500 people did all actually see something that they took for a UFO at the time, I guarantee you that more than just a single photograph would have resulted.

General Wilfried De Brouwer, who was Chief of Operations of the Air Staff at the time, initially interpreted the sightings as being caused by experimental American craft, to which American authorities "confirmed that 'no USAF stealth aircraft were operating in the ... area during the periods in question.'"

== See also ==
- UFO sightings in Belgium
- List of UFO-related hoaxes
- Black triangle UFO
