= Passaic UFO photographs =

Widely circulated photos of an alleged UFO taken in 1952

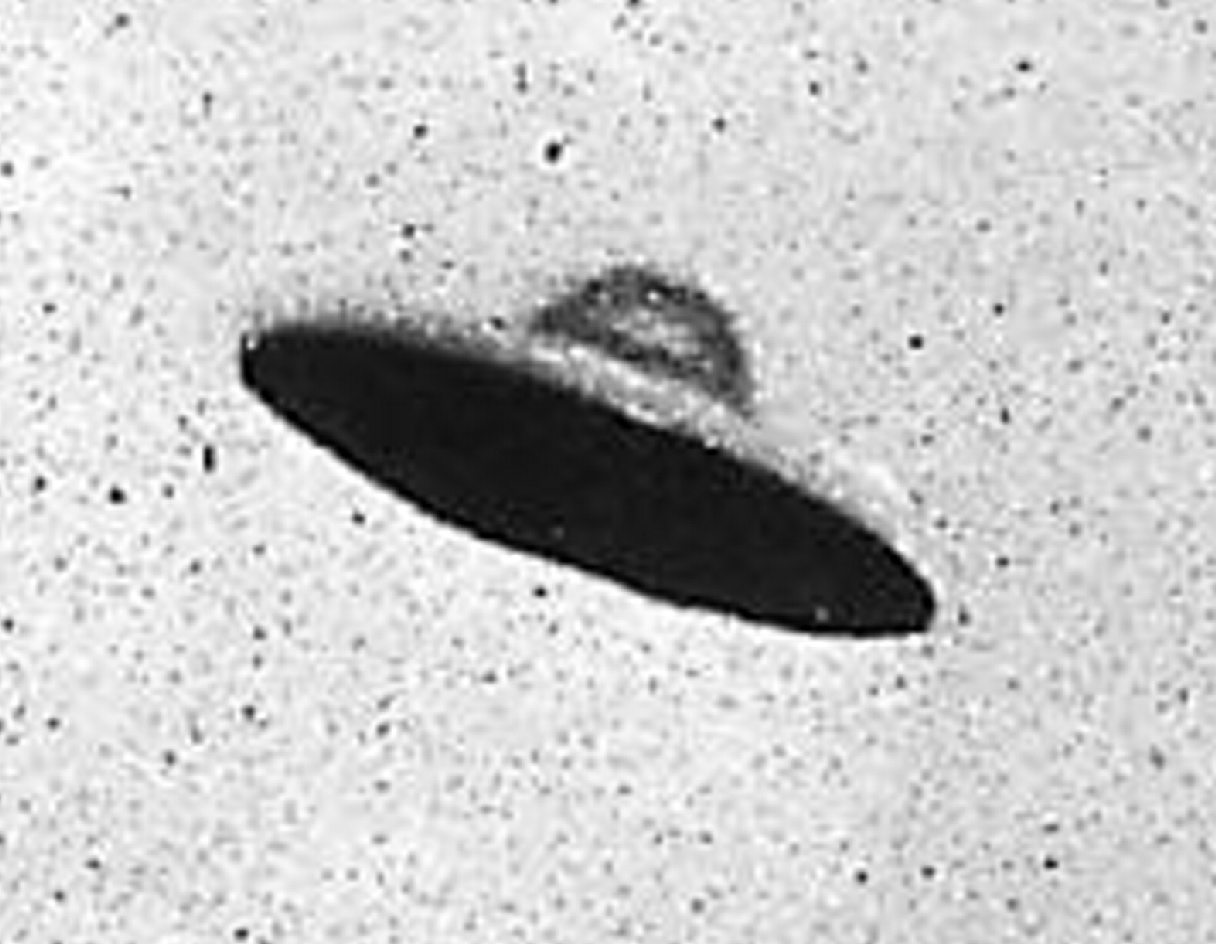
Close-up of one the Passaic UFO photographs

The Passaic UFO photographs are a set of photographs purportedly taken in Passaic, New Jersey, by George Stock on July 31, 1952. Allegedly depicting a domed flying saucer, the images were widely published in contemporary media. Ufologist Kevin D. Randle called the Passaic photos the "most spectacular" of the 1952 flap but characterized them as a hoax, with the photographs being usually compared to a lady's sun hat.

== Background ==
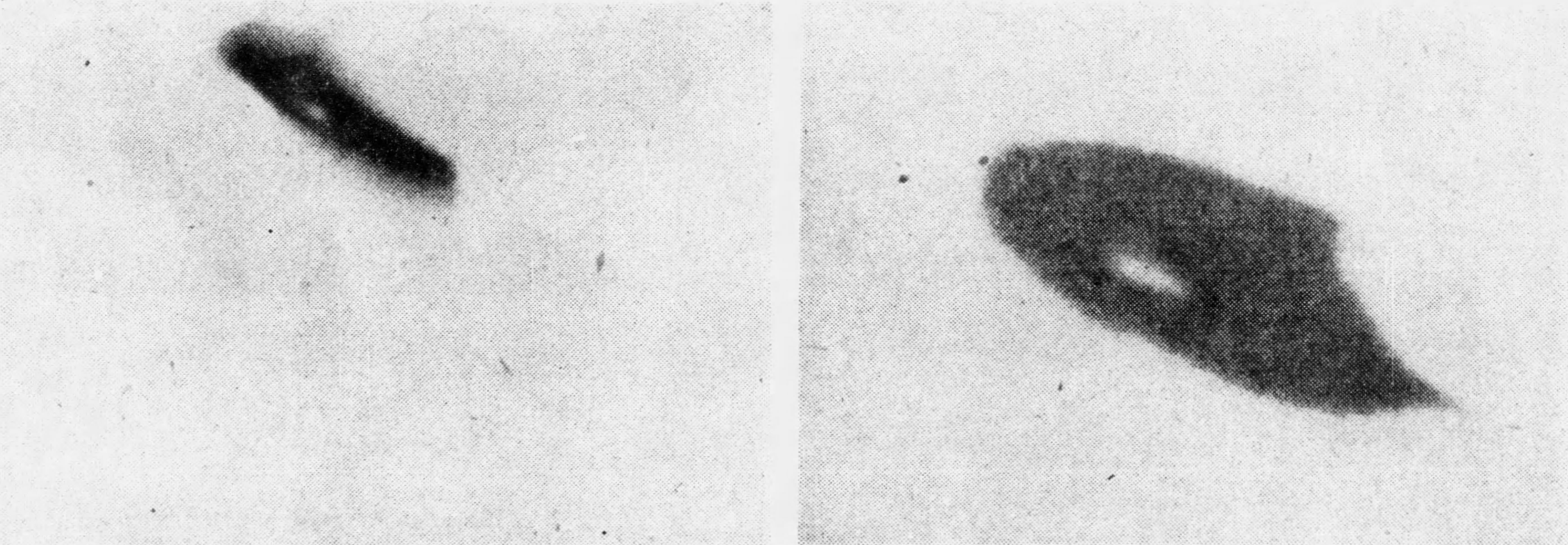
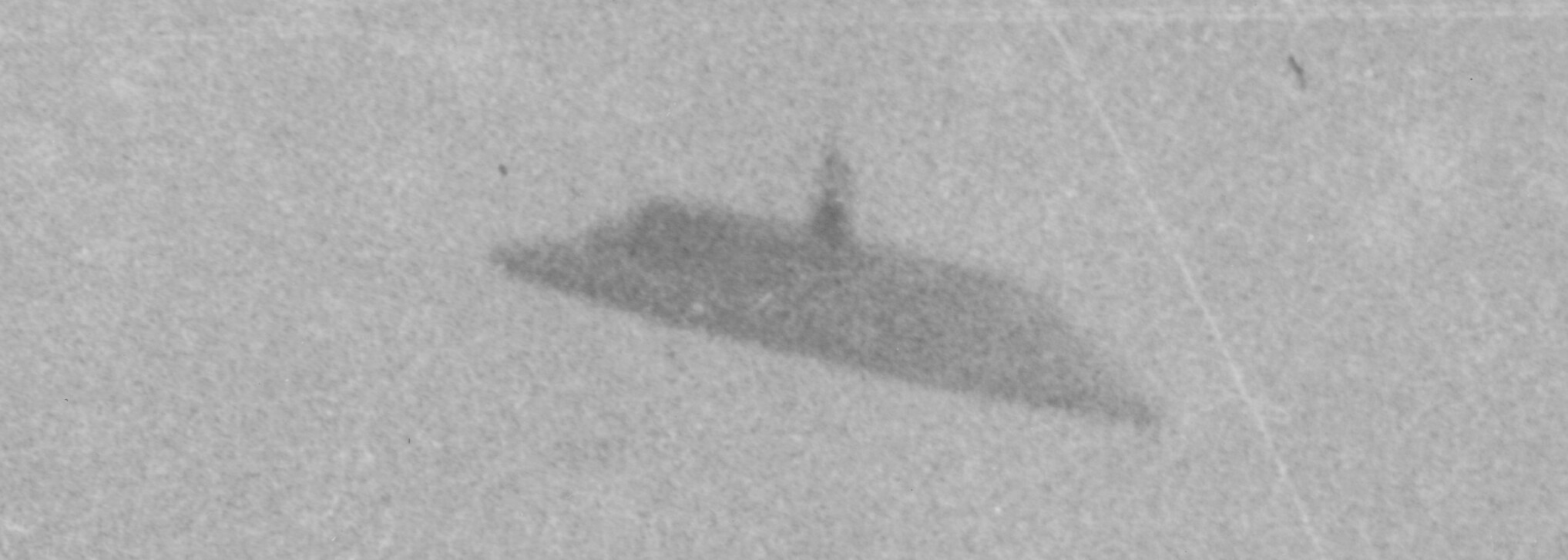
Photographs from the Rhodes case (top, 1947) and the McMinnville sighting (bottom, 1950).

The modern UFO era began with the Kenneth Arnold UFO sighting, igniting the 1947 flying disc craze. By 1952, several supposed UFO photographs had been published, including the Rhodes UFO photographs, the McMinnville UFO photographs, and the Mariana UFO film.

The July 1947 Twin Falls saucer hoax featured a domed saucer about 3 feet (0.91 m) in diameter made of two cymbals and a plexiglass dome. In 1951, the film The Day The Earth Stood Still premiered, featuring a domed saucer which lands in Washington D.C.

The April 7, 1952 issue of Life featured an article under the title "Have We Visitors From Space?"; at that time, Life was the most reputable outlet to seriously consider the possibility that flying saucers might actually be extra-terrestrial spaceships. Publicity surrounding the piece is believed to have contributed to the subsequent wave of reports that summer. In the four years prior, the US Air Force had chronicled a total of 615 UFO reports; during the 1952 flap, they received over 717 new reports. Ruppelt recalled: "During a six-month period in 1952... 148 of the nation's leading newspapers carried a total of over 16,000 items about flying saucers."

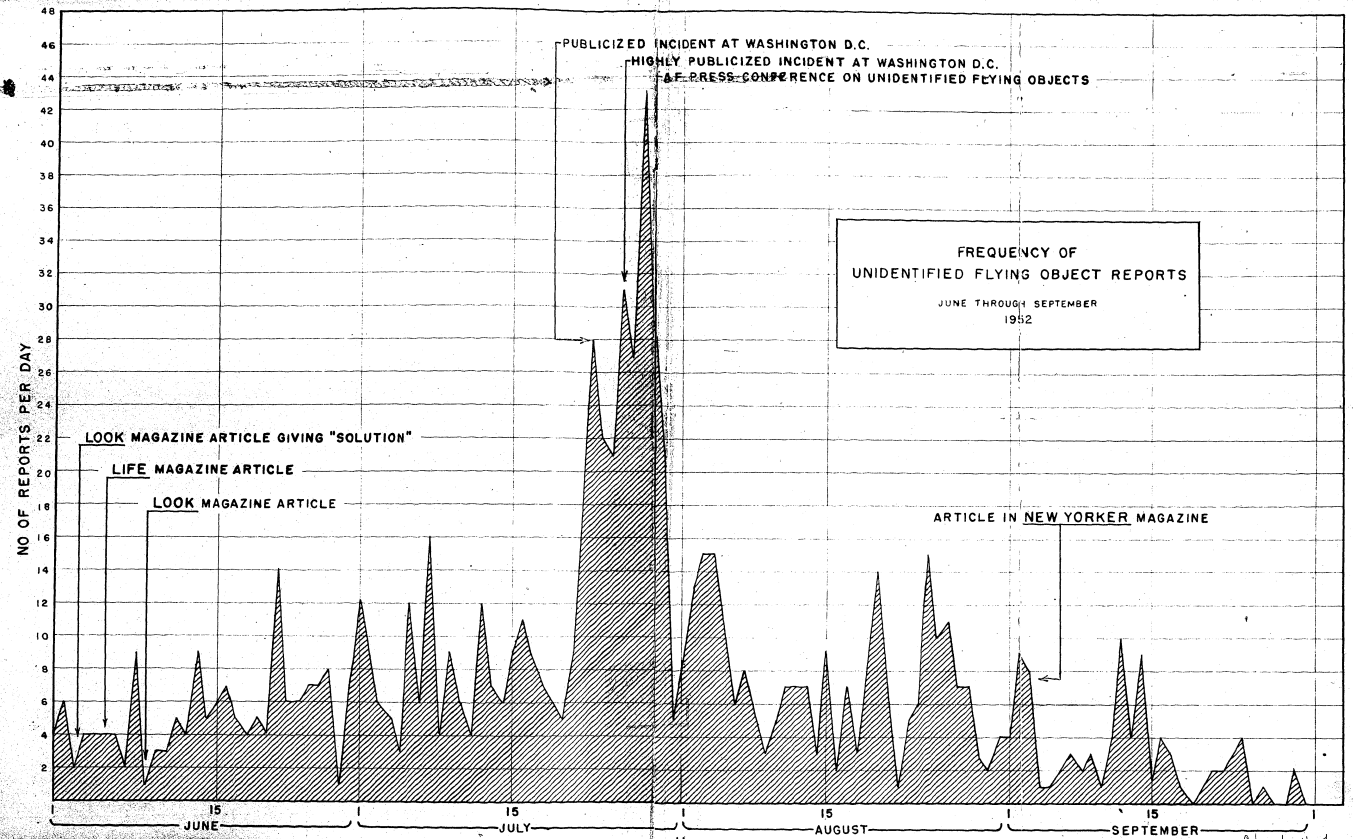
Reports peaked in late July.

On two successive Saturday nights, July 19 and 26, UFOs were reported over the nation's capitol. Three days later, on July 29, Air Force Major Generals John Samford, USAF Director of Intelligence, and Roger M. Ramey, USAF Director of Operations, held a well-attended press conference at the Pentagon. In his opening comments, he noted that, out of the hundreds of UFO reports in recent years investigated by the Air Force, there was "a certain percentage of this volume of reports that have been made by credible observers of relatively incredible things" but that none of them posed any national security threat.

== Passaic photographs ==
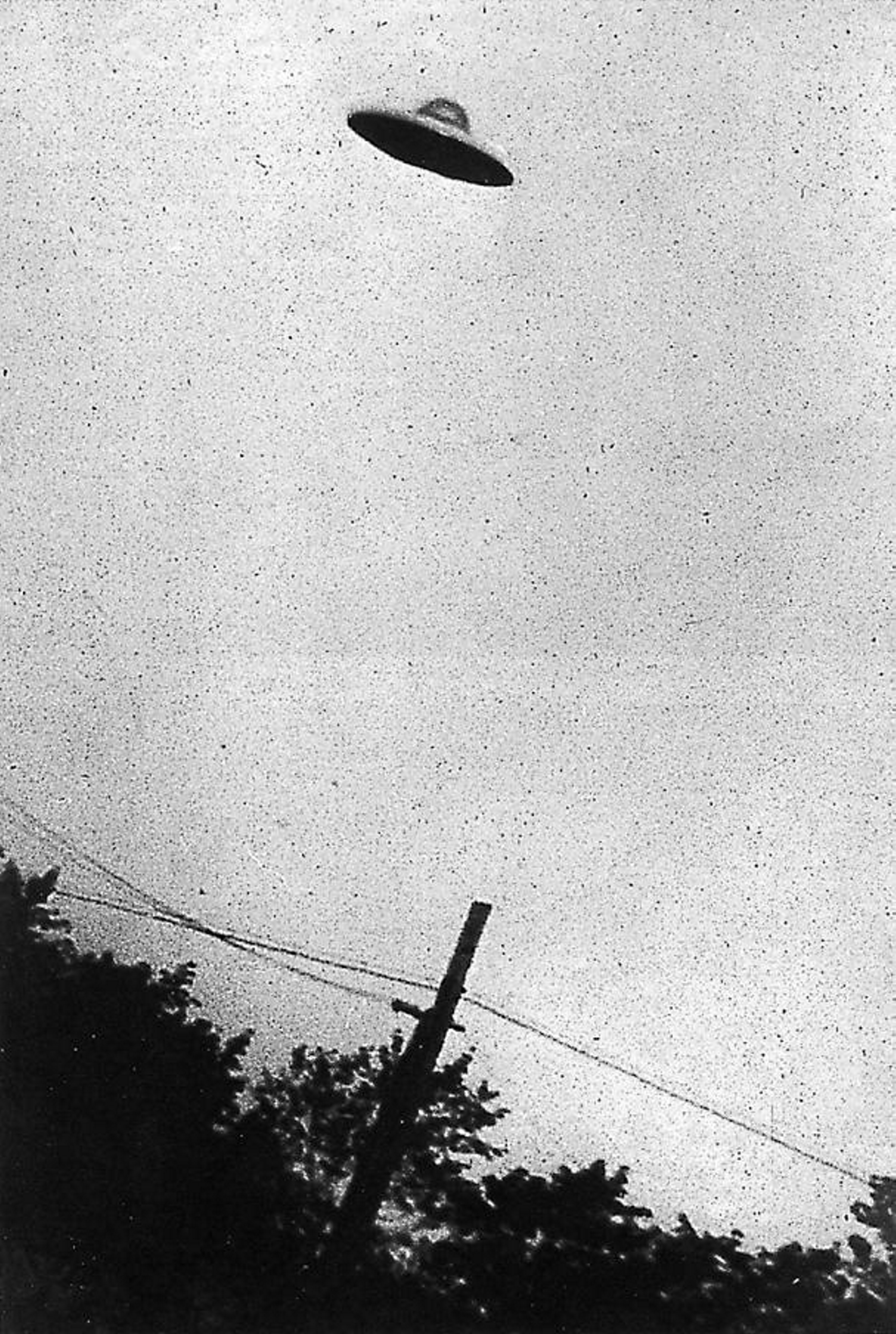
One of the Passaic UFO photos

On August 1, during the 1952 UFO flap, local press reported on the photos, attributing them to John H. Riley, then aged 28, who was a self-described professional photographer and performed photo processing in Passaic. Riley reported that he and friend George J. Stock had witnessed the object the prior morning, July 31, while at Stock's home.

Riley recalled that the object was heading southeast at a "leisurely pace" before coming to a halt and hovering overhead. Riley claimed "It was so near, it could have been hit with a rifle". He described the object as 30 feet (9.1 m) wide and estimated it was hovering at 200 feet (61 m). He described the object as silent. Riley claimed the object tilted as it began moving towards the southwest, ultimately travelling out of sight.

Initial press accounts noted the novel presence of a "dome"-like shape atop the depicted disc, writing "The pictures may not exactly fit the descriptions of flying saucers you've heard about".

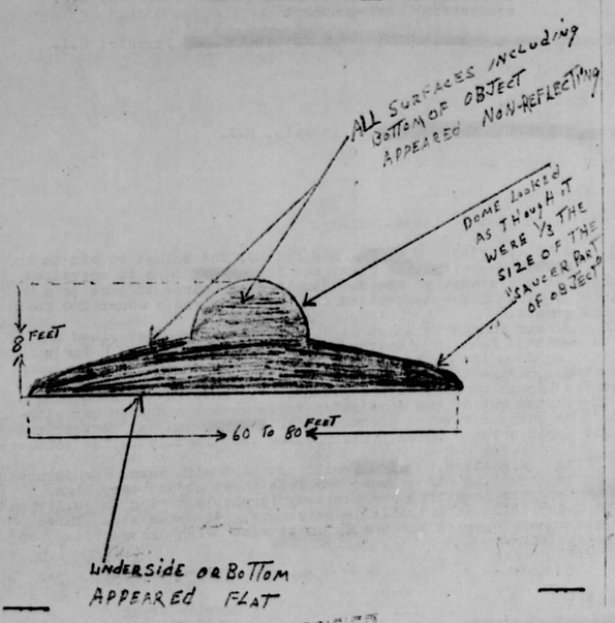
Air Force sketch of the Passaic saucer, as described by Stock

On November 19, 1952, George Stock was interviewed by an Air Force investigator and acknowledged having taken the pictures. The Air Force Office of Special Investigation conducted interviews with acquaintances of Riley and Stock. During that investigation, Air Force Special Agent George H. Wertz created a sketch of the object allegedly photographed by Stock.

== Aftermath ==
In December 1952, photographs of an alleged domed flying saucer were published by George Adamski. In 1967, Look magazine reprinted the images. The images were widely republished within the UFO community, including the works of Otto Binder, Kevin Randle, and Jerome Clark.

In 2009, Weird NJ reported that "Passaic County is to UFO buffs what Coney Island is to hot dog lovers". In 2015, the George Stock images were among those uploaded to the CIA's official website.
