= Jane Manchun Wong =

Hong Kong-American technology blogger and app researcher (born 1994)

- 黃文津
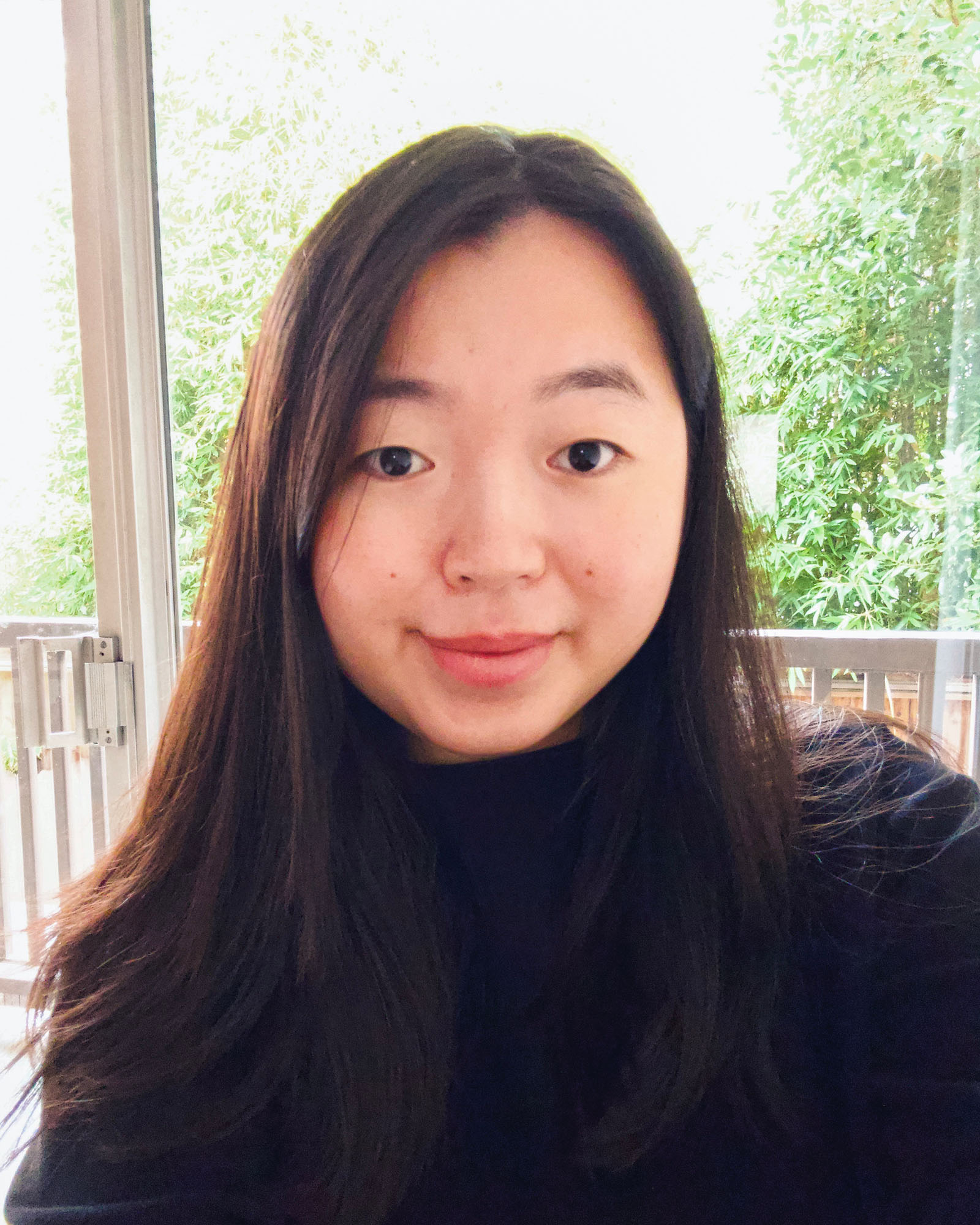
- Wong in 2024
- Born: April 13, 1994 (age 32); British Hong Kong
- Education: University of Massachusetts Dartmouth (dropped out)
- Occupations: Technology blogger; app researcher; white hat hacker
- Years active: 2017–present

Chinese name
- Traditional Chinese: 黃文津
- Simplified Chinese: 黄文津
Transcriptions
Standard Mandarin
- Hanyu Pinyin: Huáng Wénjīn
Yue: Cantonese
- Yale Romanization: Wòhng Màhn jēun
- Jyutping: Wong^{4} Man^{4} zeon^{1}
- Website: wongmjane.com

Jane Manchun Wong (born April 13, 1994) is a Hong Kong technology blogger and app researcher best known for discovering unreleased features of online services such as Facebook or Instagram.

In December 2021, Wong was featured on Forbes' 2022 30 Under 30: Social Media list. Between June 2023 and October 2024, she was an employee of Meta, working on Instagram and Threads.

== Personal life ==
Wong is a self-taught coder who grew up in Hong Kong. She developed an interest in security vulnerabilities at a young age. At seven, she circumvented her parents' controls on their computer by replacing Microsoft Windows with Linux to "prove the point".

Wong studied computer science at UMass Dartmouth but left a few months prior to graduating due to medical issues. In June 2023, she relocated to San Francisco to work on Instagram and Threads for Meta before being laid off in October 2024. In December 2024, she stated on Threads that she was joining a new startup as a senior software engineer.

== Discoveries ==
Wong's first notable discovery came in October 2017 when she revealed Facebook was testing a résumé feature.

In 2018, Wong leaked screenshots of Facebook Dating's homepage before its release and also revealed a map feature on Facebook which shows the locations of nearby friends.

On April 18, 2019, she announced Instagram was testing hiding like counts, which was confirmed twelve days later by Adam Mosseri.

Among other discoveries, Wong also revealed LinkedIn's dark mode, Lyft's digital wallet, and Twitter users having an option to hide replies to their tweets.

Wong discovers these features by examining sites' public source code.
